= Common surface features of Mars =

The common surface features of Mars include dark slope streaks, dust devil tracks, sand dunes, Medusae Fossae Formation, fretted terrain, layers, gullies, glaciers, scalloped topography, chaos terrain, possible ancient rivers, pedestal craters, brain terrain, and ring mold craters.

== Ancient shoreline evidence ==
Recent studies, particularly from China’s Zhurong rover and supporting orbital data, provide robust evidence for ancient shorelines in Mars’ northern lowlands, notably in Utopia Planitia. Ground-penetrating radar profiles collected along a 0.8 km traverse detected 76 subsurface reflectors dipping uniformly between 6° and 20° (mean ≈ 15°) at depths of 9–35 m, closely matching the foreset bedding angles of terrestrial sandy beaches.

Sediment-texture analysis indicates these layers consist of sand-sized particles delivered by rivers from the southern highlands and reworked by gentle wave action rather than by wind or lava flow.

Crater-count dating and stratigraphic correlations bracket the northern ocean transgression to ≈ 3.68 Ga, with regression and surface-water loss complete by ≈ 3.42 Ga, implying a 200–300 Myr interval of stable coastal conditions during the Late Noachian–Early Hesperian epochs.

Analogs on Earth show beach face slopes of 4°–26° under wave-dominated conditions, matching the Martian dip angles and strengthening the interpretation of a coastal depositional environment on early Mars.

These findings are complemented by orbital observations of > 15 000 clay-rich mounds in nearby Chryse Planitia—remnants of ancient highlands eroded by water nearly 4 billion years ago—preserving layered, phyllosilicate-bearing outcrops that record prolonged aqueous alteration and shore-zone retreat.

Collectively, the stratigraphy, sedimentology, and chronology of these coastal deposits establish the strongest quantitative case yet for dynamic, wave-influenced Martian beaches and a long-lived northern ocean. Such environments may have been prime habitats for early microbial life, making them high-priority targets for future astrobiological exploration.

== Slope streaks ==
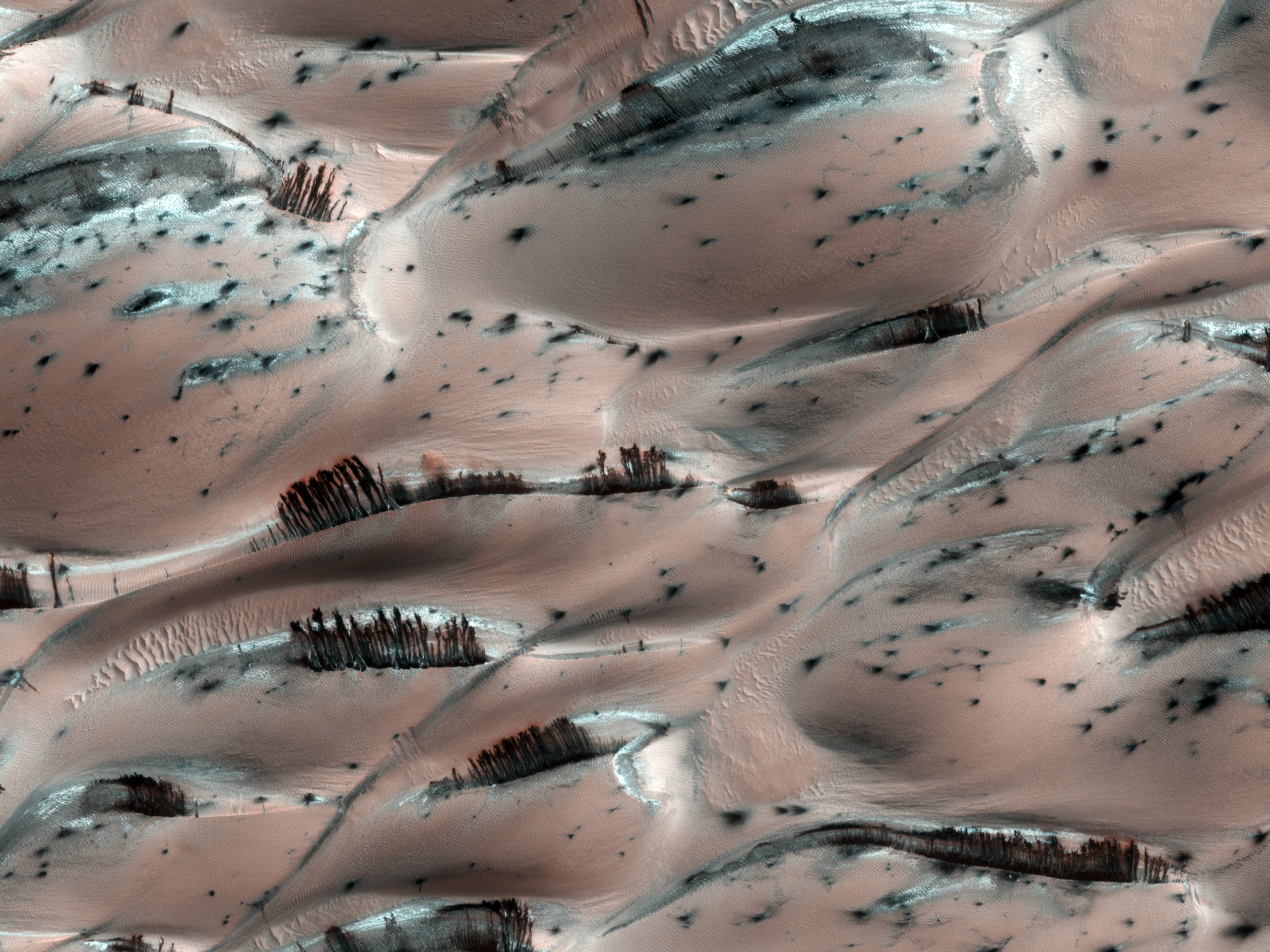
When occurring near the top of a dune, dark sand may cascade down the dune leaving dark surface streaks – streaks that might appear at first to be trees standing in front of the lighter regions.

A new phenomenon known as slope streaks has been uncovered by the HiRISE camera on the Mars Reconnaissance Orbiter. These features appear on crater walls and other slopes, and they are thin and many hundreds of metres long. The streaks have been observed to grow slowly over the course of a year or so, always beginning at a point source. Newly formed streaks are dark in colour but fade as they age until white. The cause is unknown, but theories range from dry dust avalanches (the favoured theory) to brine seepage.

Examples of dark slope streaks from various parts of Mars are shown below. Click on image to get a better view.

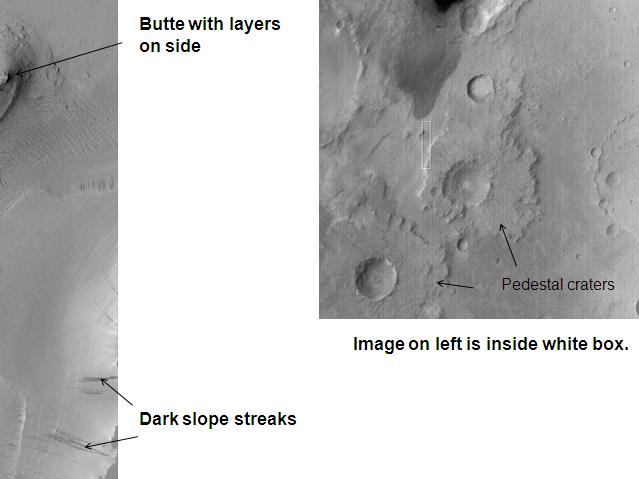
Tikhonravov Crater floor in Arabia quadrangle, as seen by Mars Global Surveyor. Click on image to see dark slope streaks and layers.

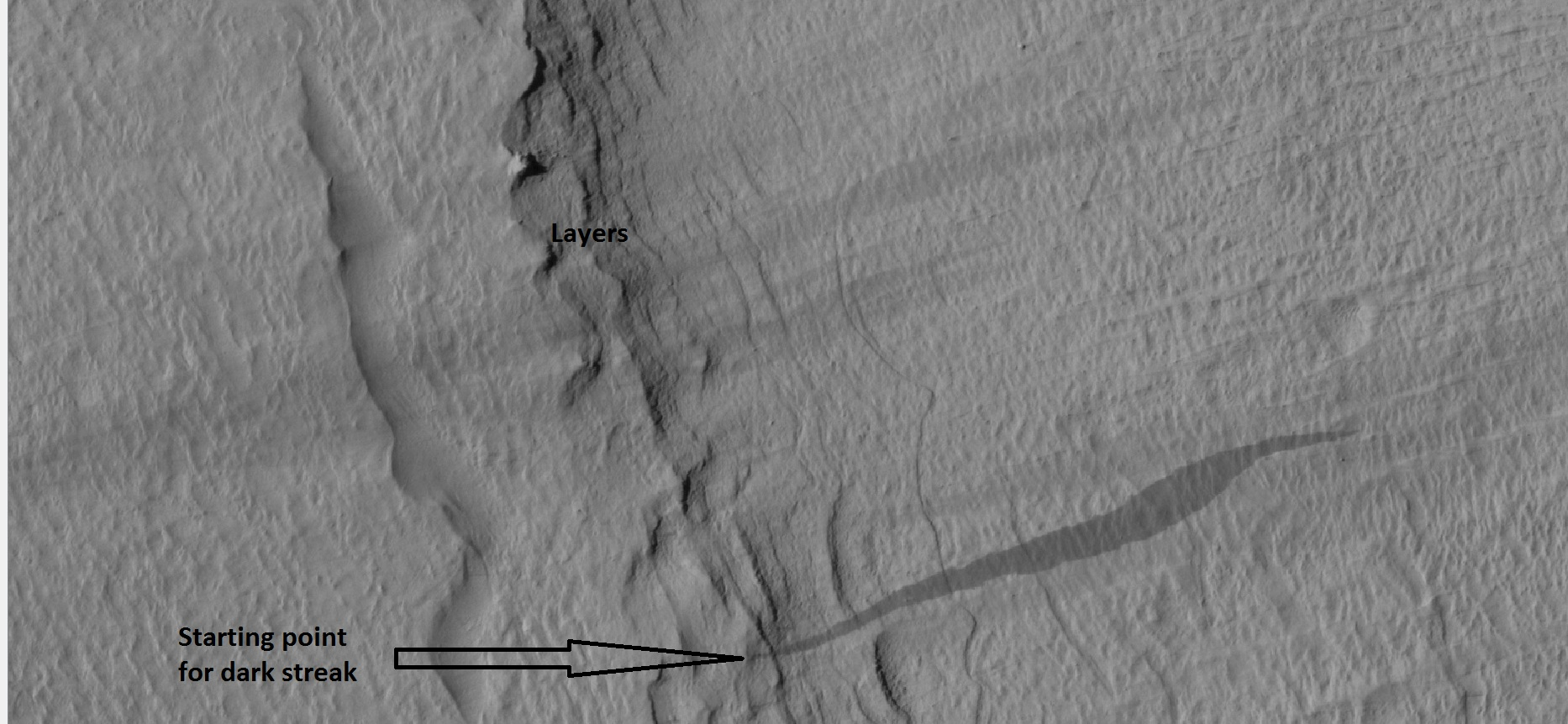
Close-up of some layers under cap rock of a pedestal crater and a dark slope streak, as seen by HiRISE under HiWish program.

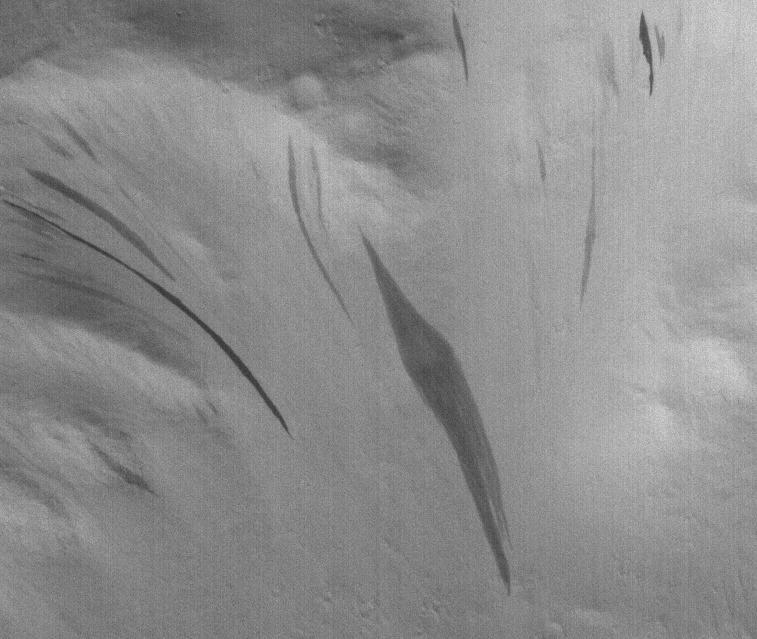
Dark streaks in Diacria quadrangle, as seen by Mars Global Surveyor.

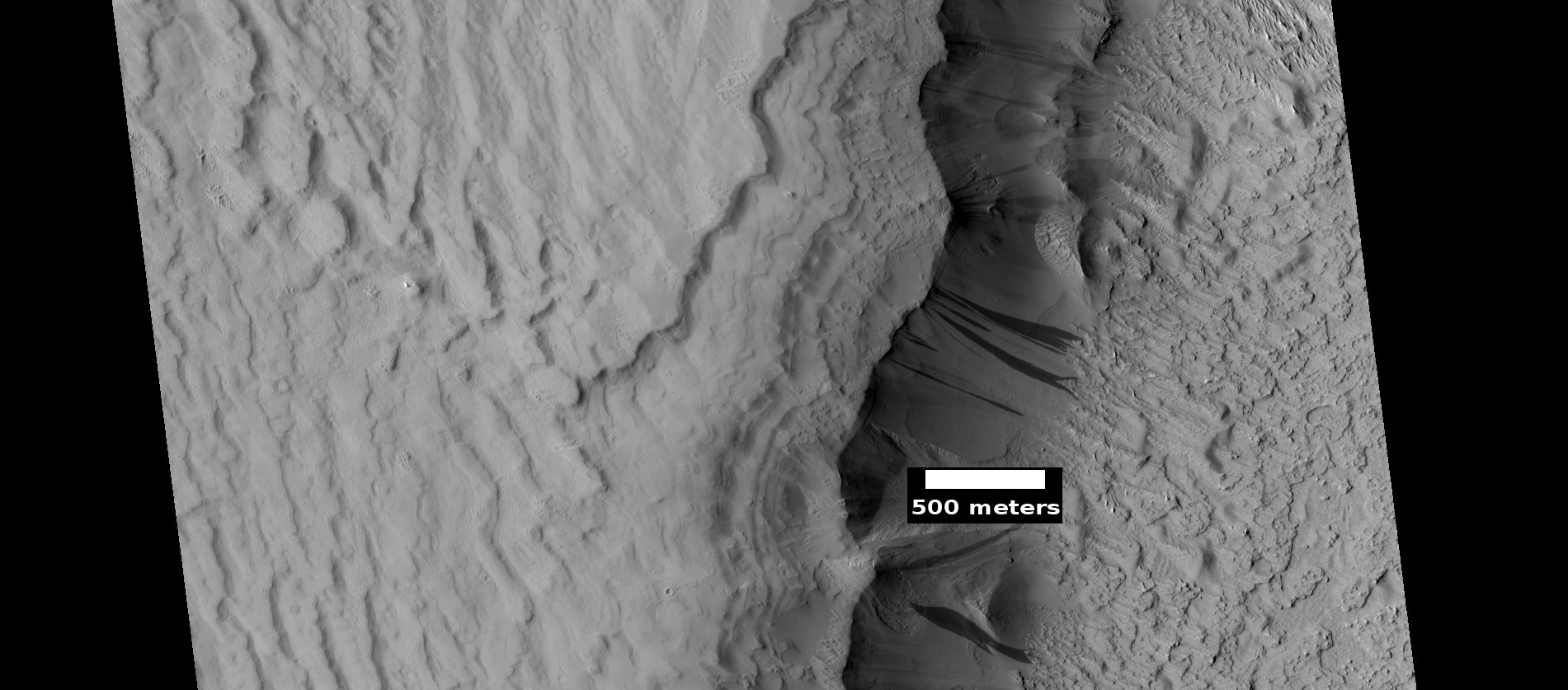
Layers and dark slope streaks, as seen by HiRISE under HiWish program

== Recurrent slope lineae ==
Recurrent slope lineae are small dark streaks on slopes that elongate in warm seasons. They may be evidence of liquid water.

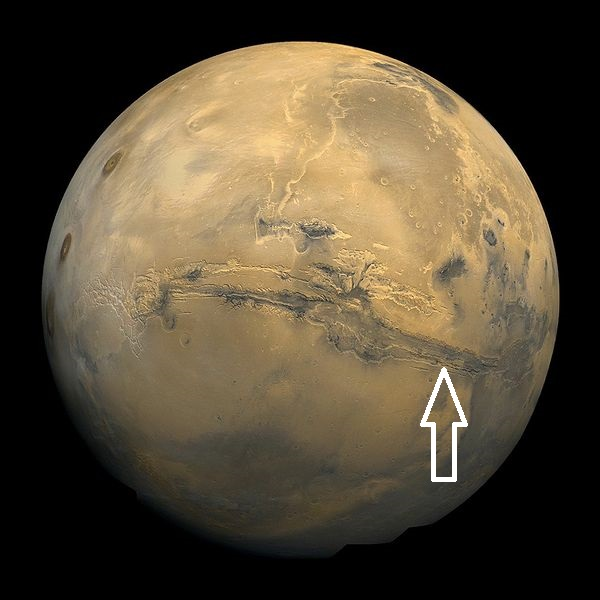
Image of disk of Mars taken by Viking. Arrow shows location of recurrent slope lineae in following HiRISE images.

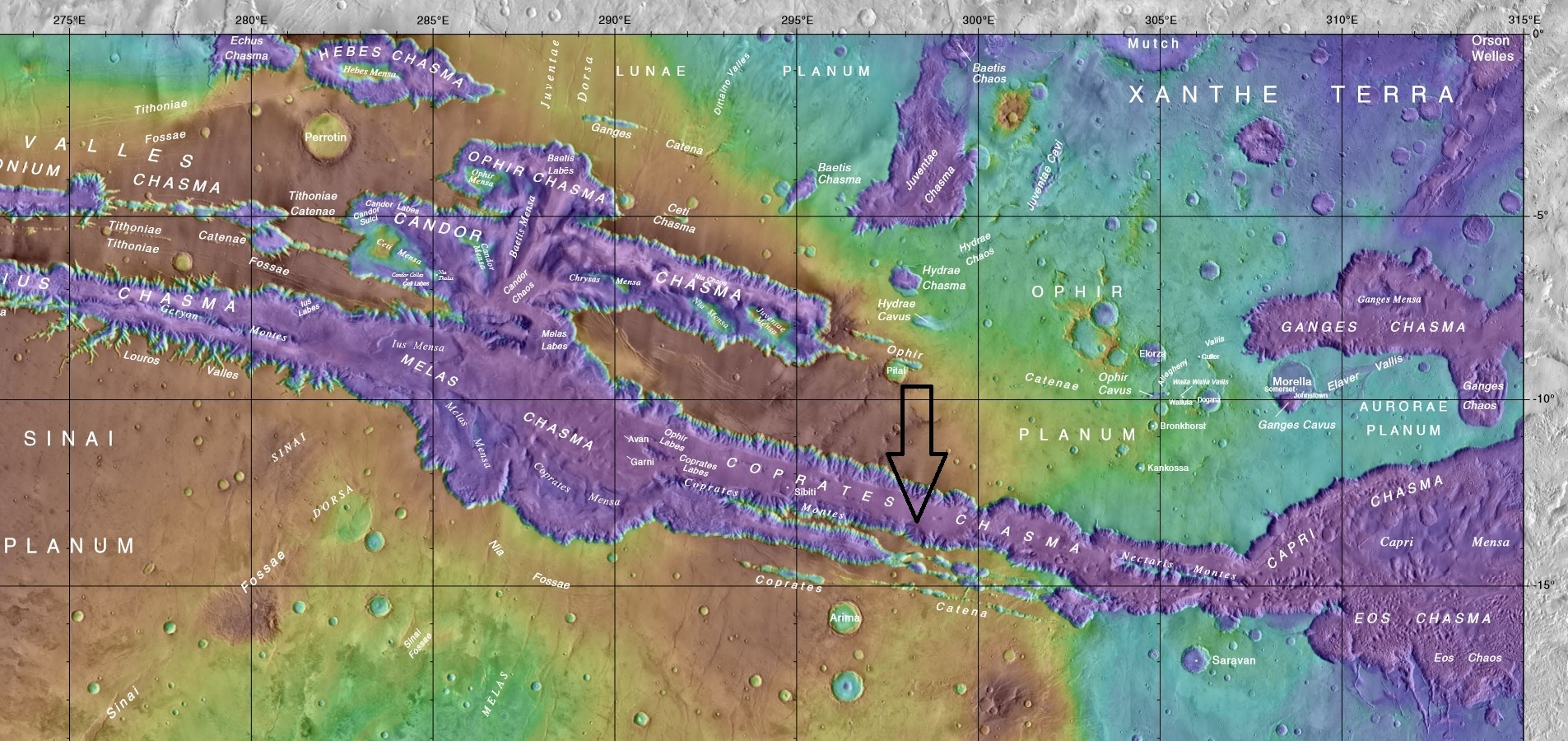
Labeled map of features near to Coprates Chasma. Arrow shows location of recurrent slope lineae in following HiRISE images.

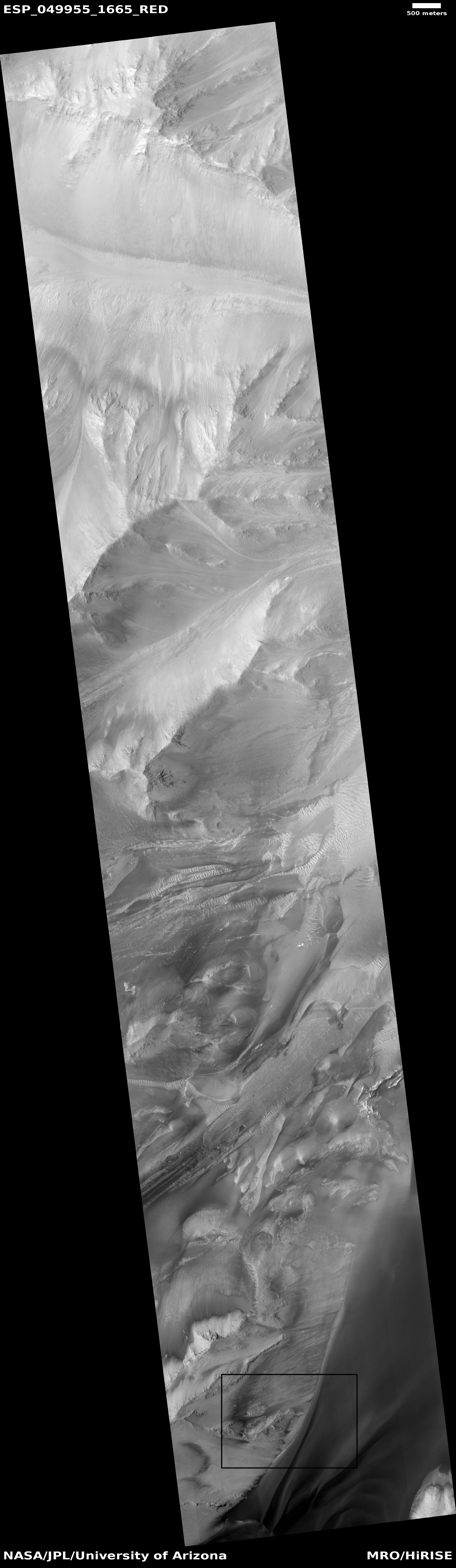
Wide view of part of Valles Marineris, as seen by HiRISE under HiWish program Box shows location of recurrent slope lineae that are enlarged in next image.

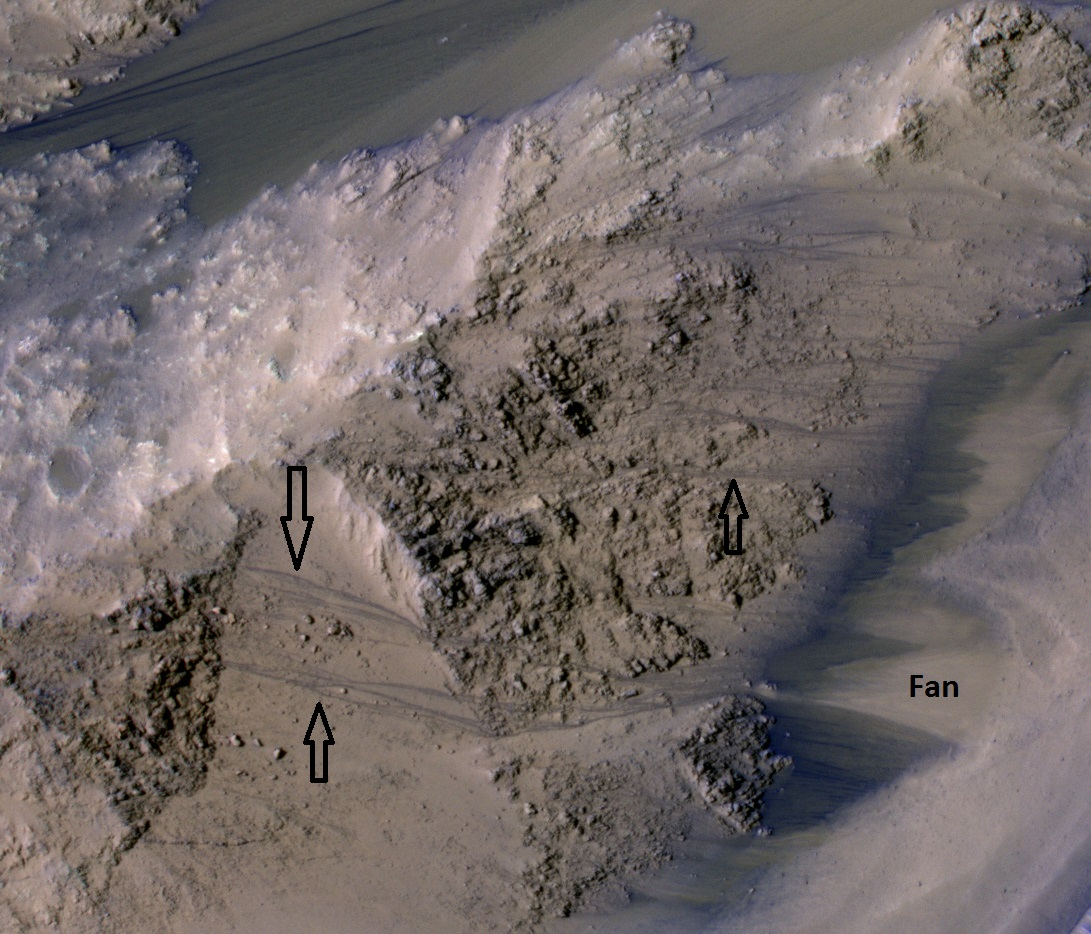
Close, color view of recurrent slope lineae, as seen by HiRISE under HiWish program Arrows point to some of the recurrent slope lineae. Fan may have been built up by past recurrent slope lineae.

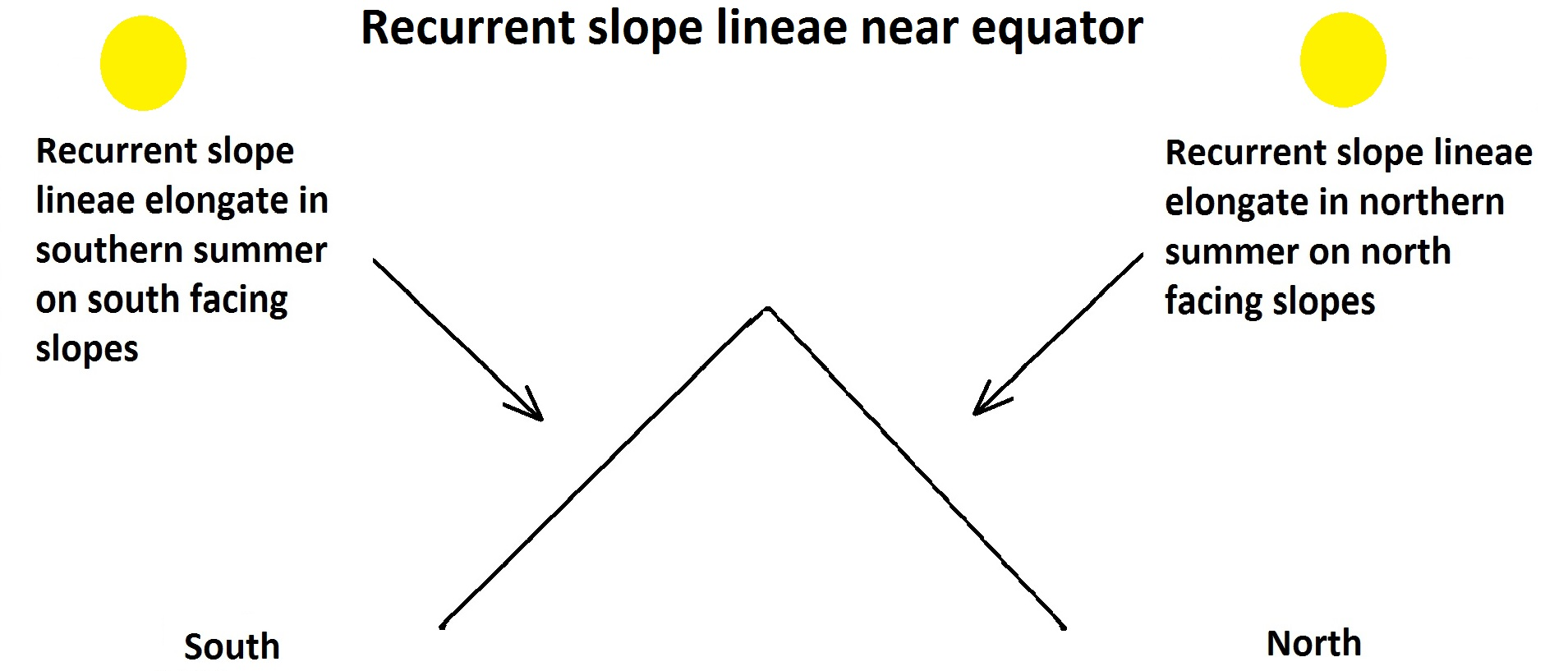
Recurrent slope lineae elongate when the slopes are at their warmest. Near the equator, RSL elongate on northern slopes in the northern summer and on the southern slopes in the southern summer.

== Dust devil tracks ==
Many areas on Mars experience the passage of giant dust devils. A thin coating of fine bright dust covers most of the Martian surface. When a dust devil travels by, it blows away the coating and exposes the underlying dark surface. These dust devils have been seen both from the ground and from orbit. They have even blown the dust off the solar panels of the Spirit and Opportunity rovers on Mars, greatly extending their lives. The twin Rovers were designed to last for 3 months; instead, Spirit lasted for 6 years, 77 days, while Opportunity continued to operate for 14 years, 136 days. The pattern of the tracks have been shown to change every few months.

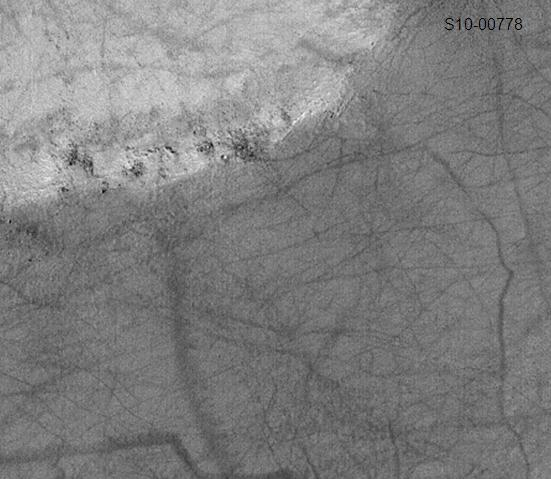
Pattern of large and small tracks made by giant dust devils, as seen by under the MOC Public Targeting Program

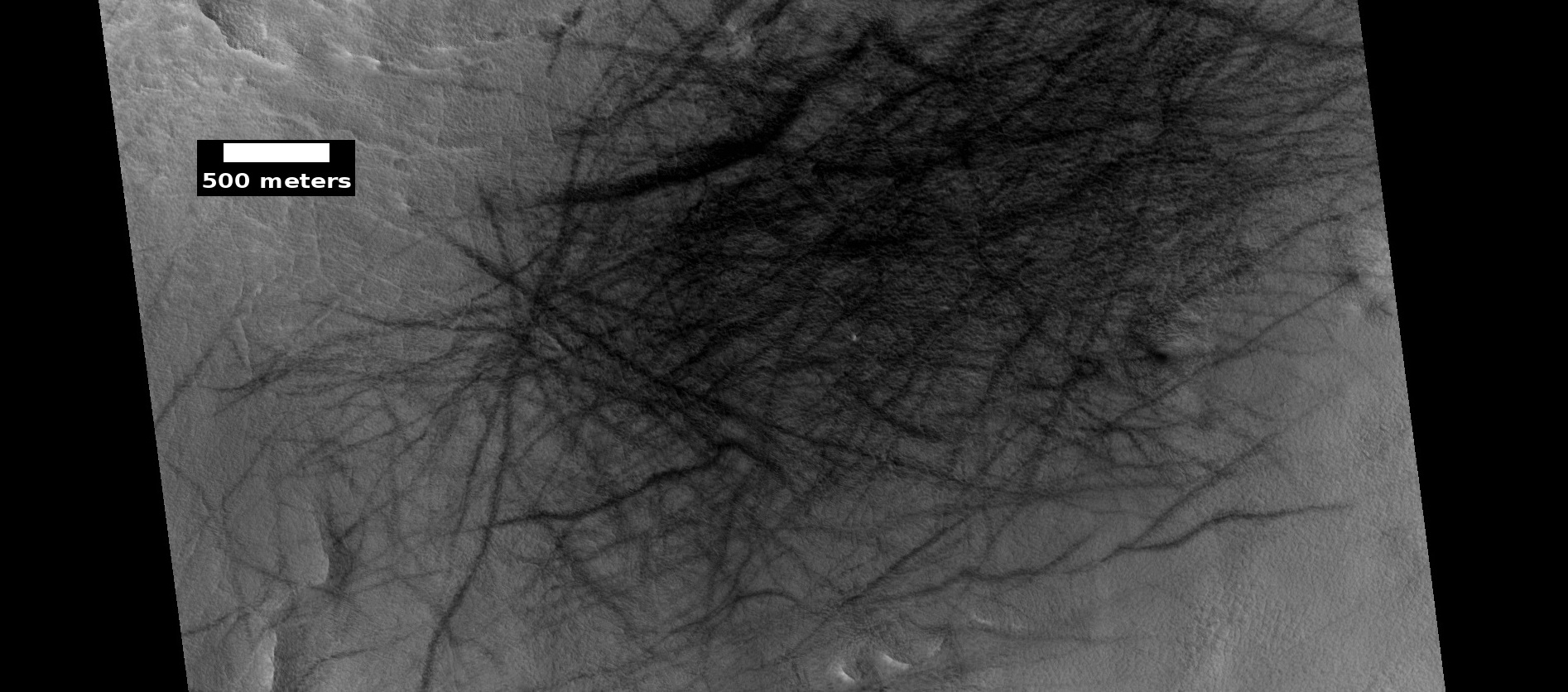
Dust devil tracks, as seen by HiRISE under HiWish program

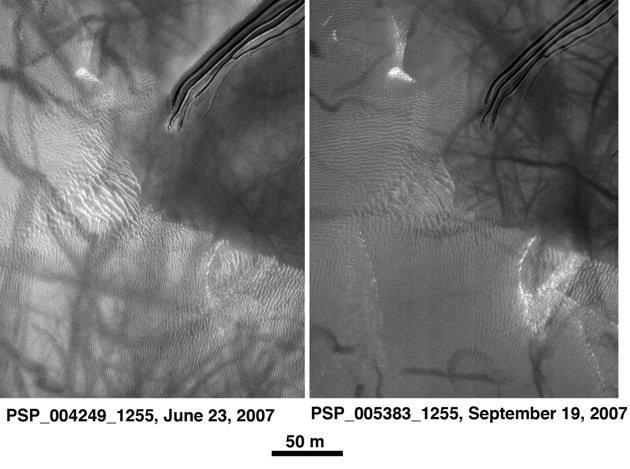
Russell Crater Dust Devil Changes in Noachis quadrangle, as seen by HiRISE. Click on image to see changes in dust devil tracks in just 3 months.

== Layers ==
Many places on Mars show rocks arranged in layers. Rock can form layers in a variety of ways. Volcanoes, wind, or water can produce layers. On the Earth much layering of rocks is done by sediments that were deposited on the floors of lakes. A detailed discussion of layering with many Martian examples can be found in Sedimentary Geology of Mars. Layers can be hardened by the action of groundwater. Martian ground water probably moved hundreds of kilometers, and in the process it dissolved many minerals from the rock it passed through. When ground water surfaces in low areas containing sediments, water evaporates in the thin atmosphere and leaves behind minerals as deposits and/or cementing agents. Consequently, layers of dust could not later easily erode away since they were cemented together.

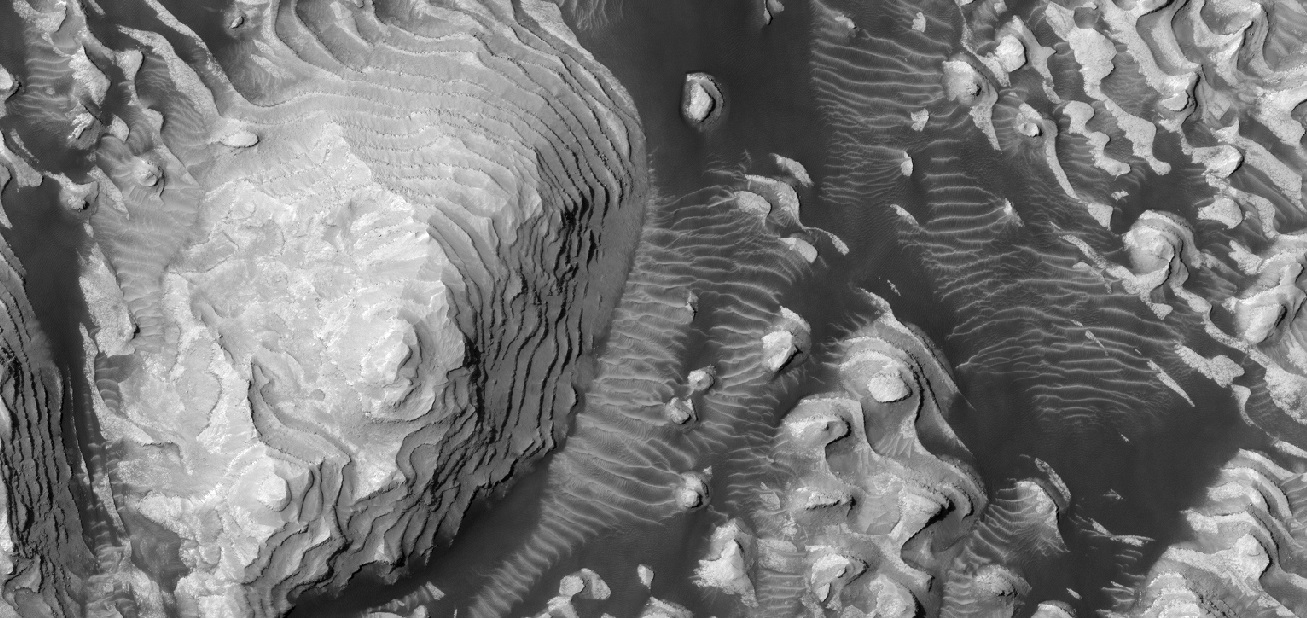
Layered mound on floor of Danielson Crater, as seen by HiRISE under HiWish program

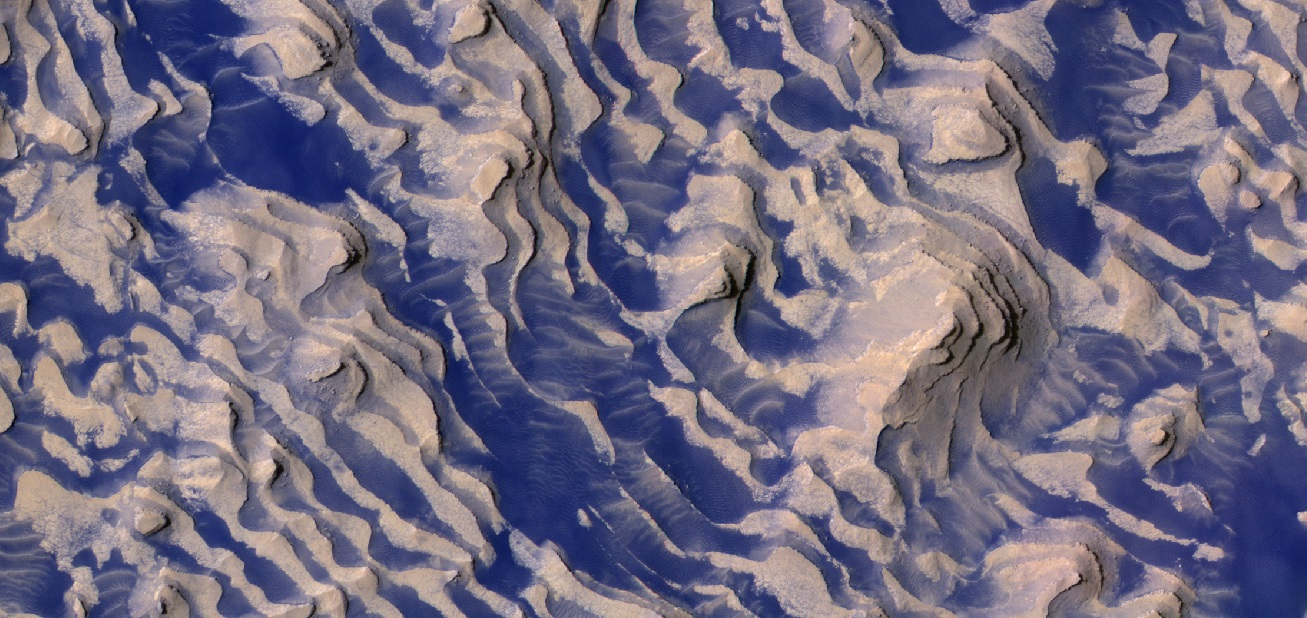
Close, color view of layers and dark dust on floor of Danielson Crater, as seen by HiRISE under HiWish program
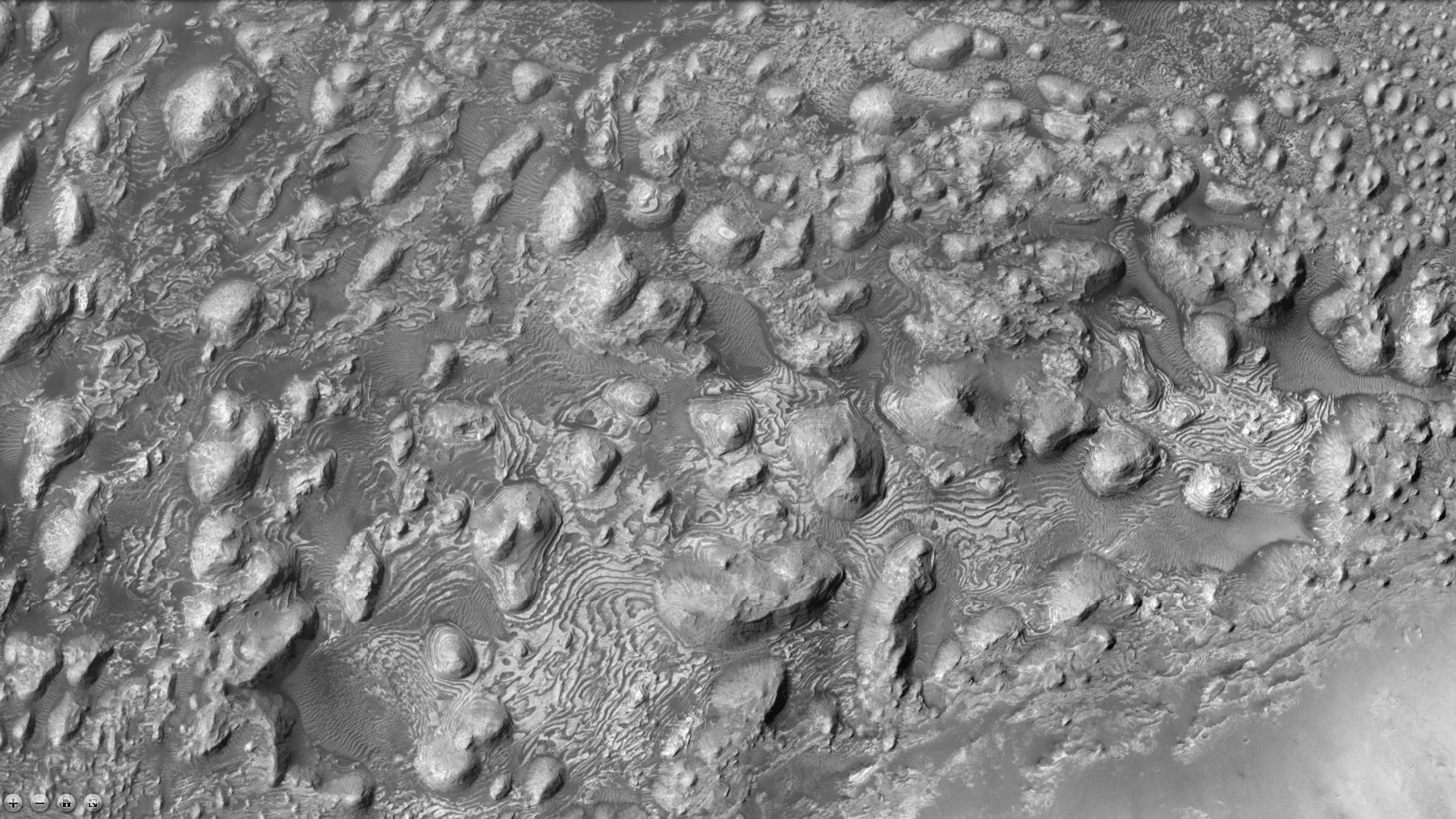
Close up view of southern part of Firsoff Crater showing layers, as seen by CTX camera (on Mars Reconnaissance Orbiter).

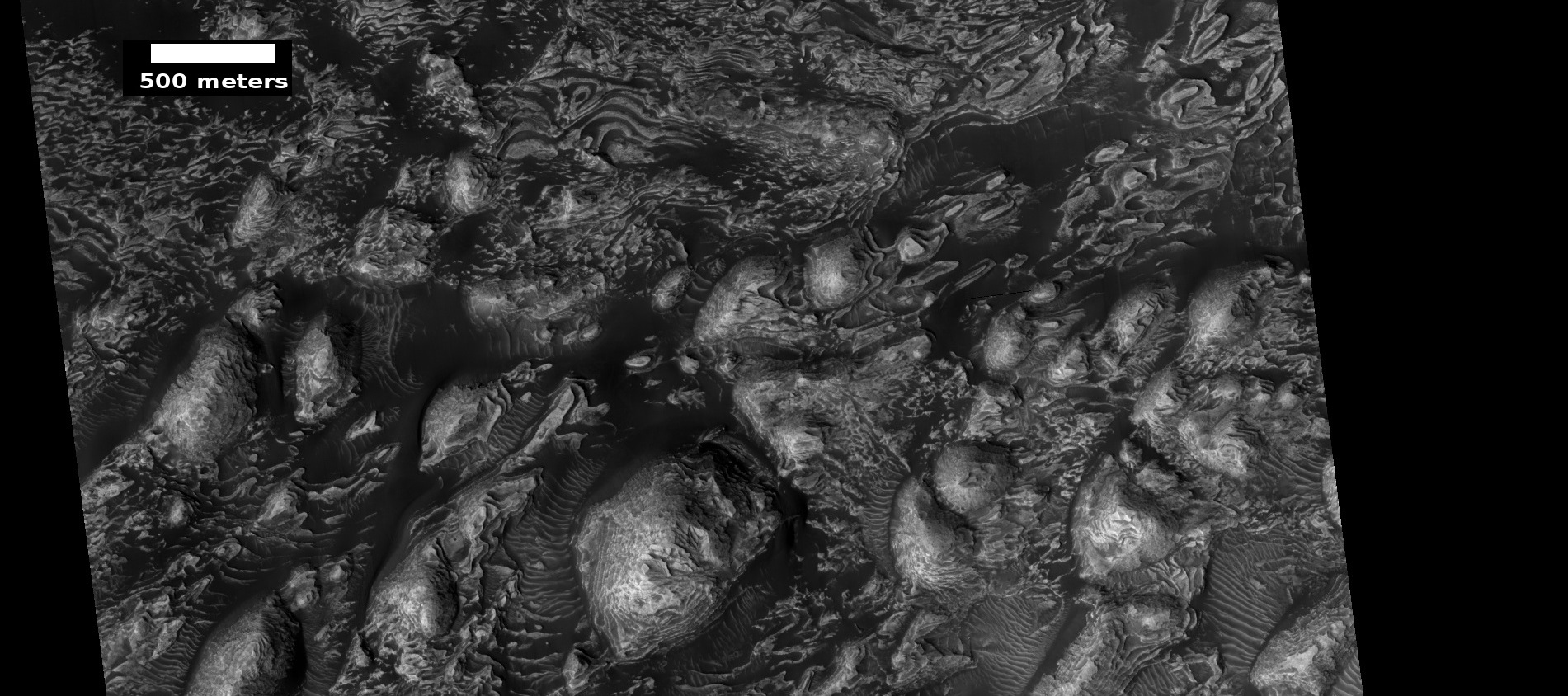
Layers in Firsoff Crater, as seen by HiRISE under HiWish program Note: this image field can be found in the previous image of the layers in Firsoff Crater, as seen by CTX camera (on Mars Reconnaissance Orbiter).

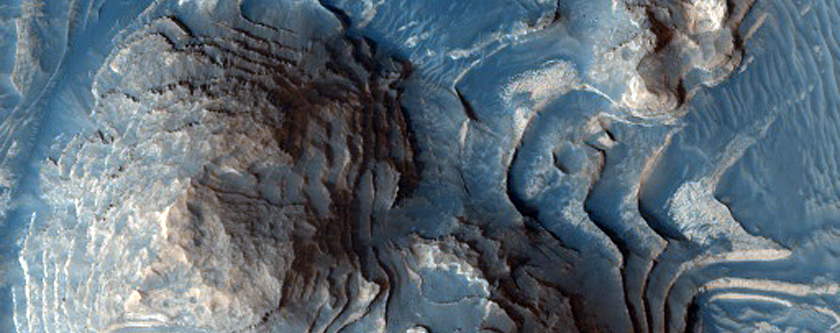
Close-up of layers in Firsoff Crater, as seen by HiRISE Note: this is an enlargement of the previous image of Firsoff Crater.

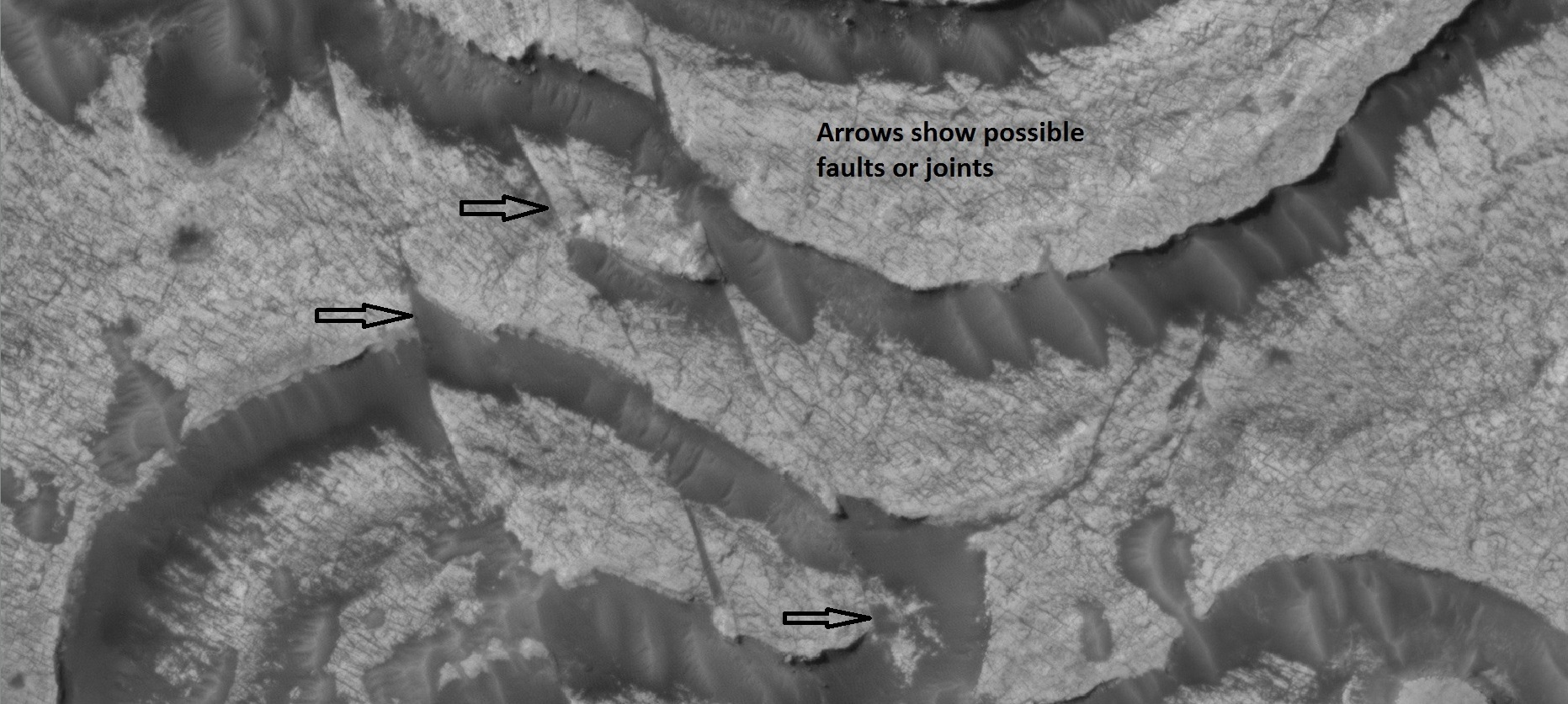
Faults and layers in Firsoff Crater, as seen by HiRISE under HiWish program. Arrows show location of faults.

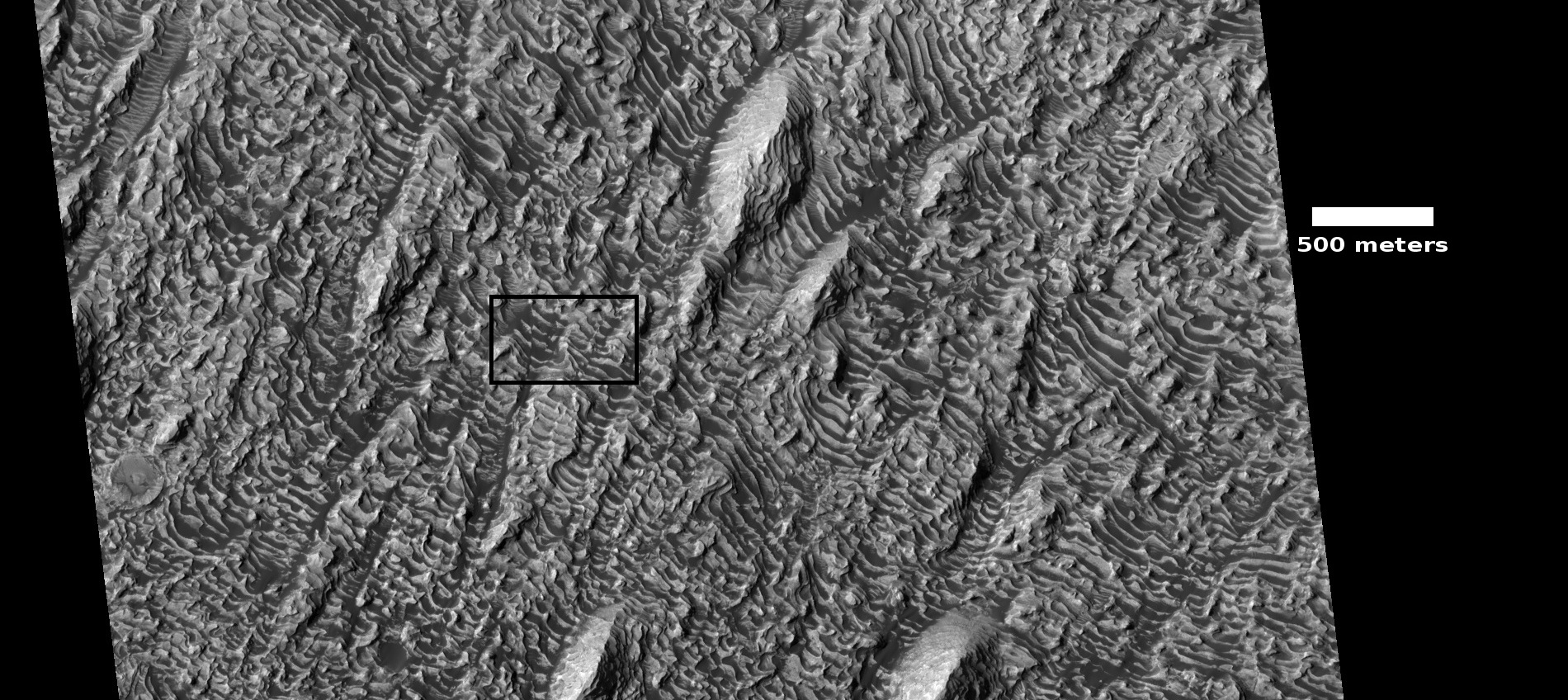
Wide-view of layers, as seen by HiRISE under HiWish program. Box shows location of next image. Dark parts of image are dark, basalt sand sitting on level places.

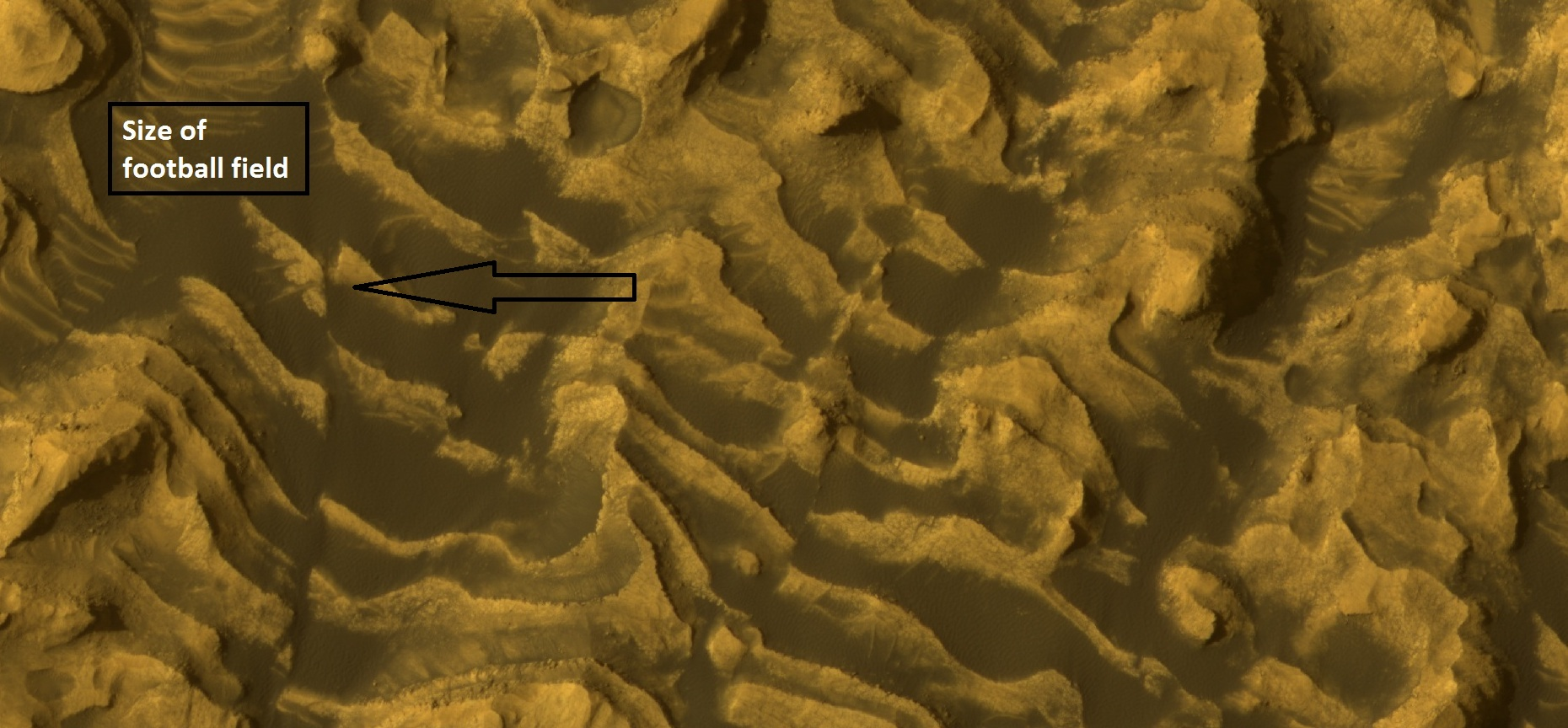
Enlargement of previous image showing a fault and layers. Image taken with HiRISE, under HiWish program.

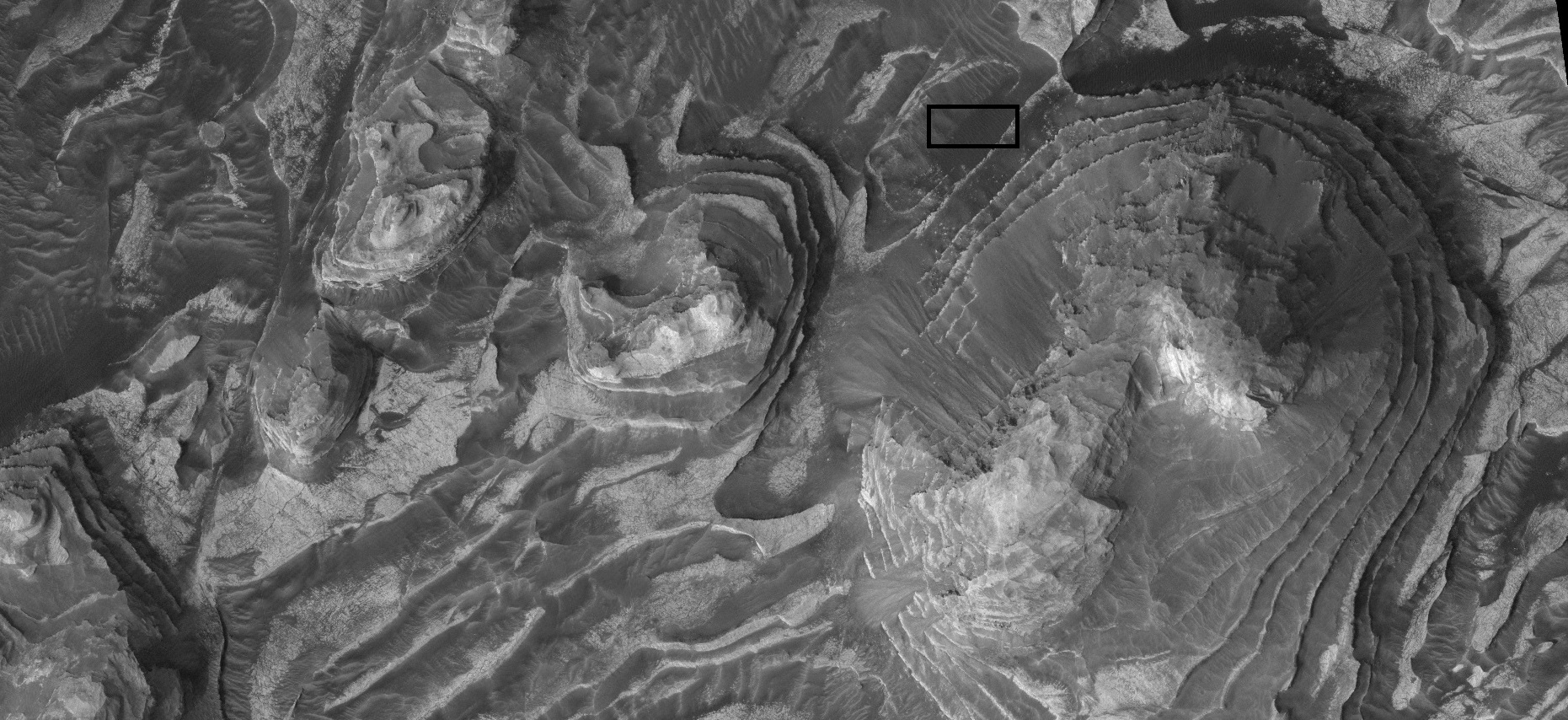
Layers in Firsoff crater with a box showing the size of a football field Picture taken by HiRISE under HiWish program.

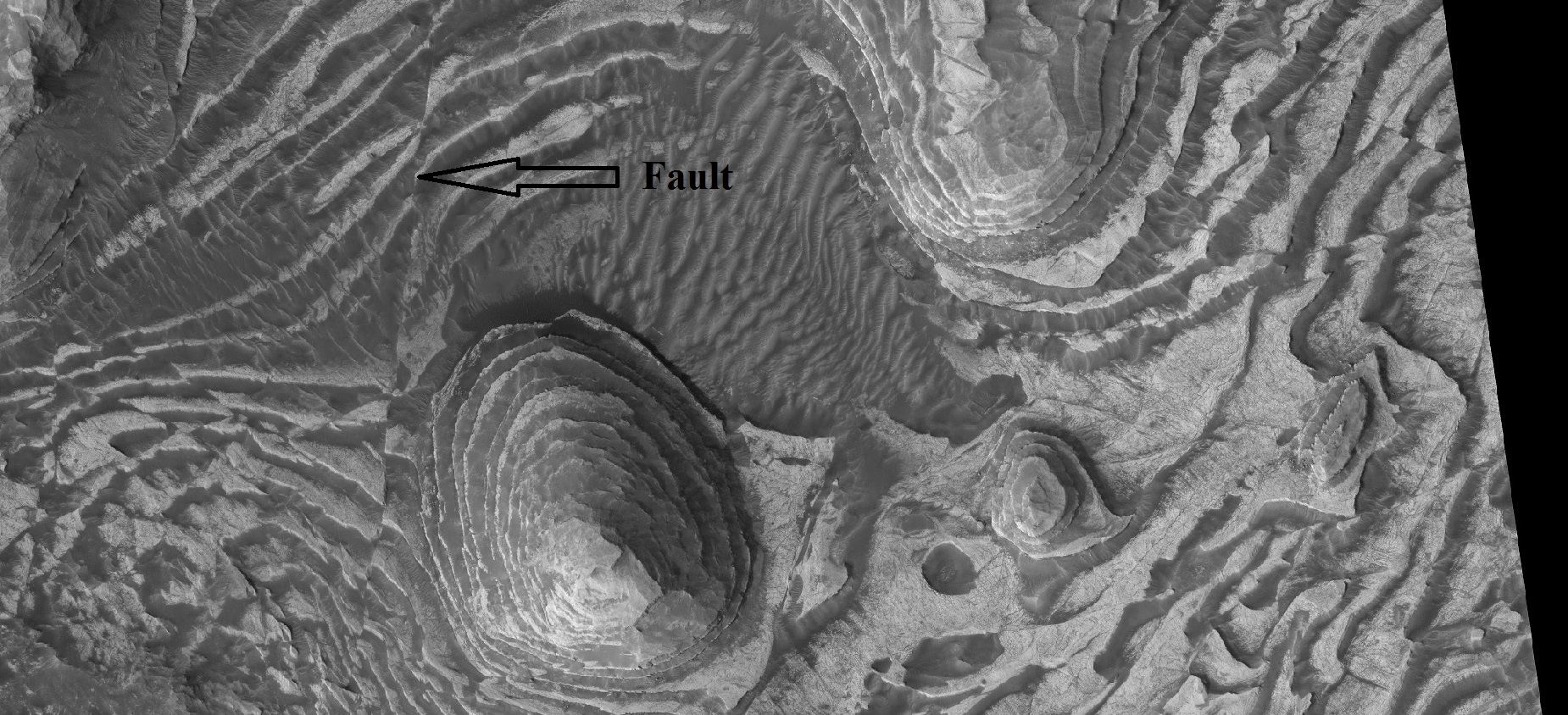
Layers and faults in Firsoff Crater, as seen by HiRISE under HiWish program. Arrows show one large fault, but there are other smaller ones in the picture.
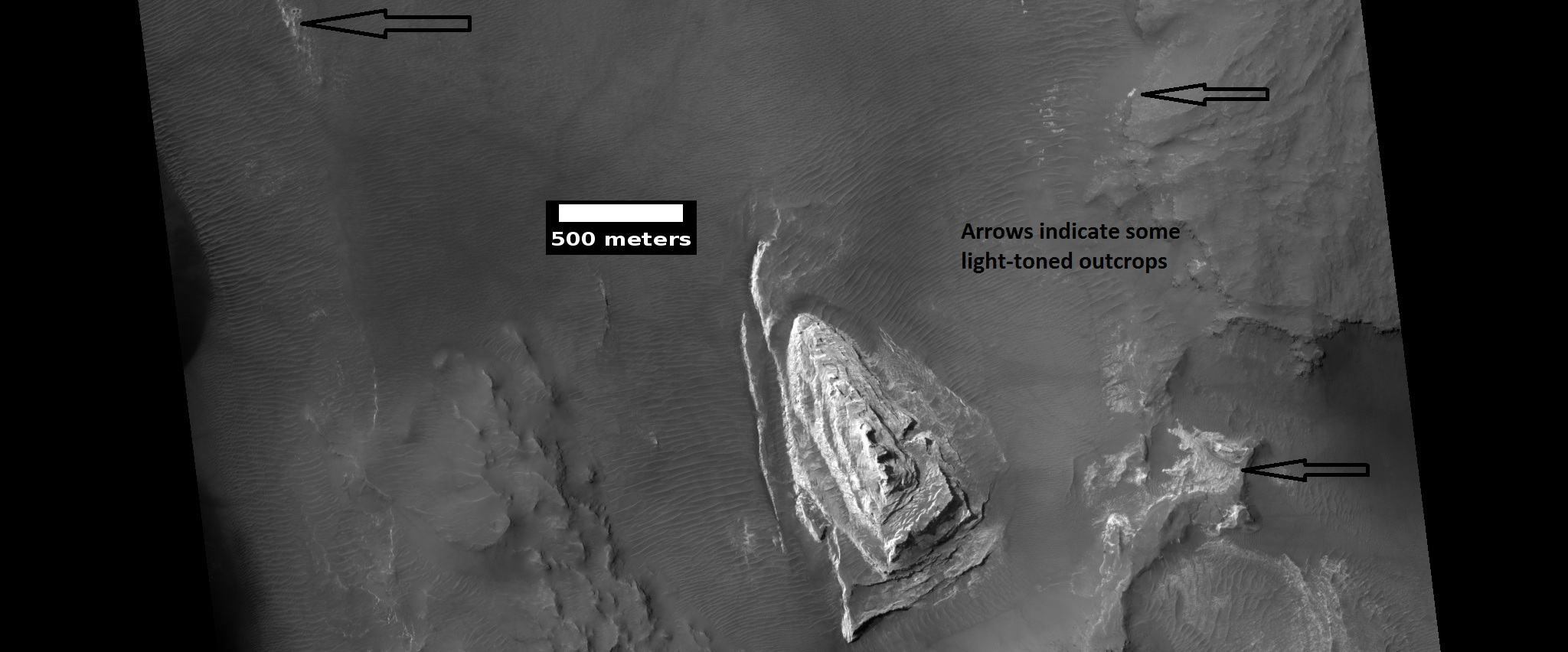
Light toned butte on floor of crater, as seen by HiRISE under HiWish program. Arrows show outcrops of light toned material. Light toned material is probably sulfate-rich and similar to material examined by Spirit Rover, and it once probably covered the whole floor. Other images below show enlargements of the butte. Location is Margaritifer Sinus quadrangle.

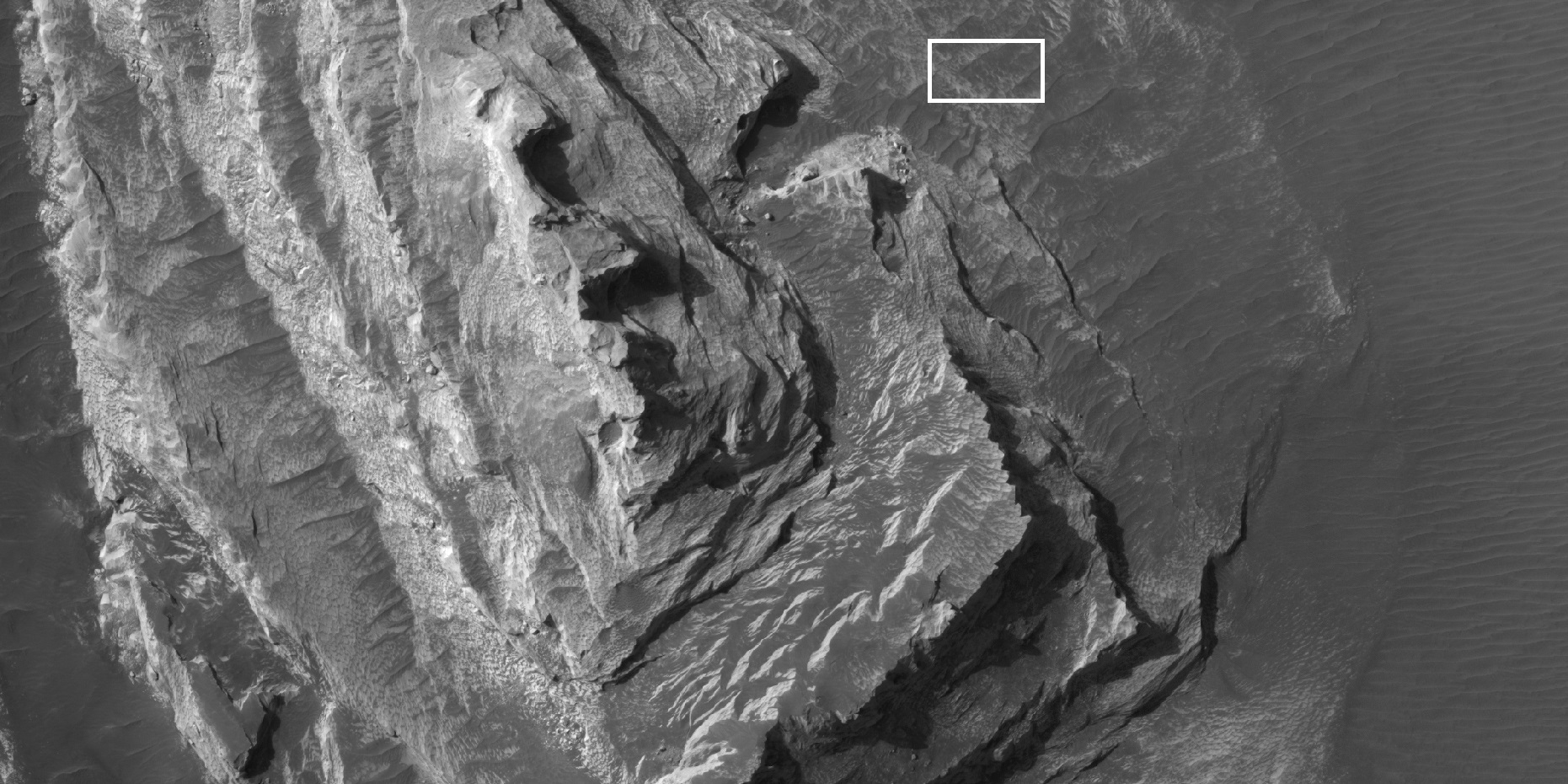
Enlargement of white butte, as seen by HiRISE under HiWish program Box shows size of a football field.

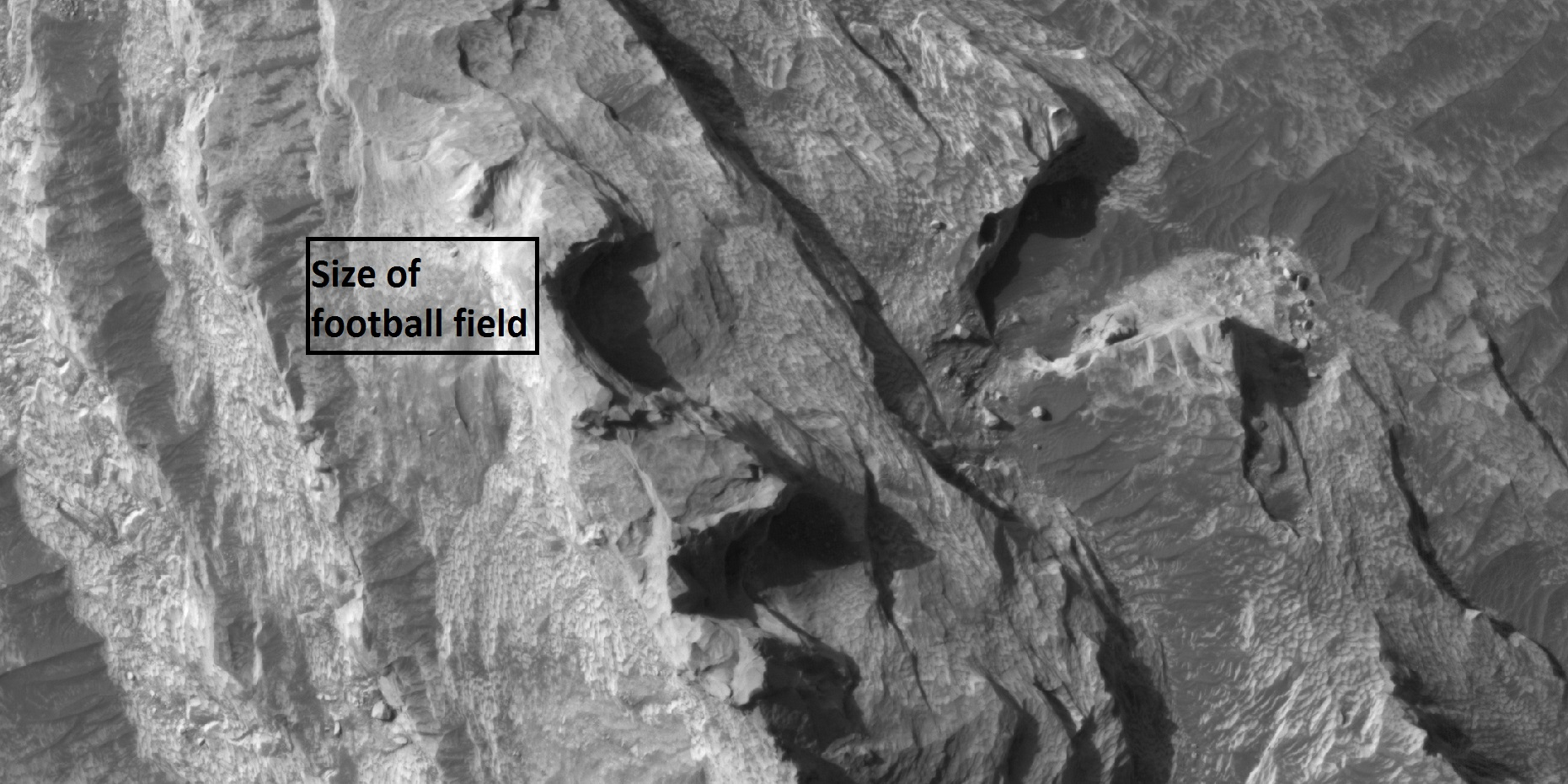
Closer view towards top of white butte, as seen by HiRISE under HiWish program Box shows size of a football field.

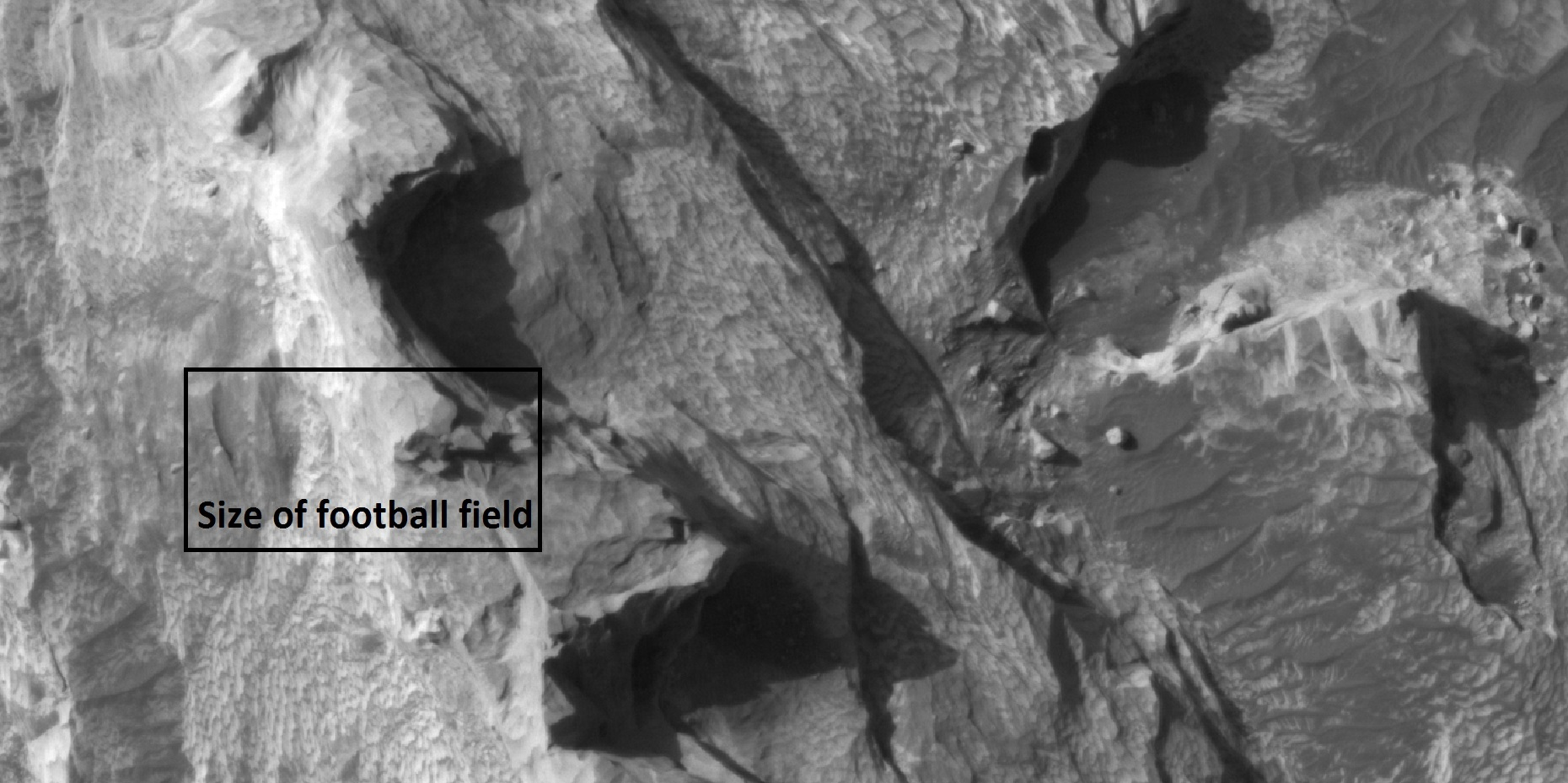
Top of white butte, as seen by HiRISE under HiWish program Box shows size of a football field.
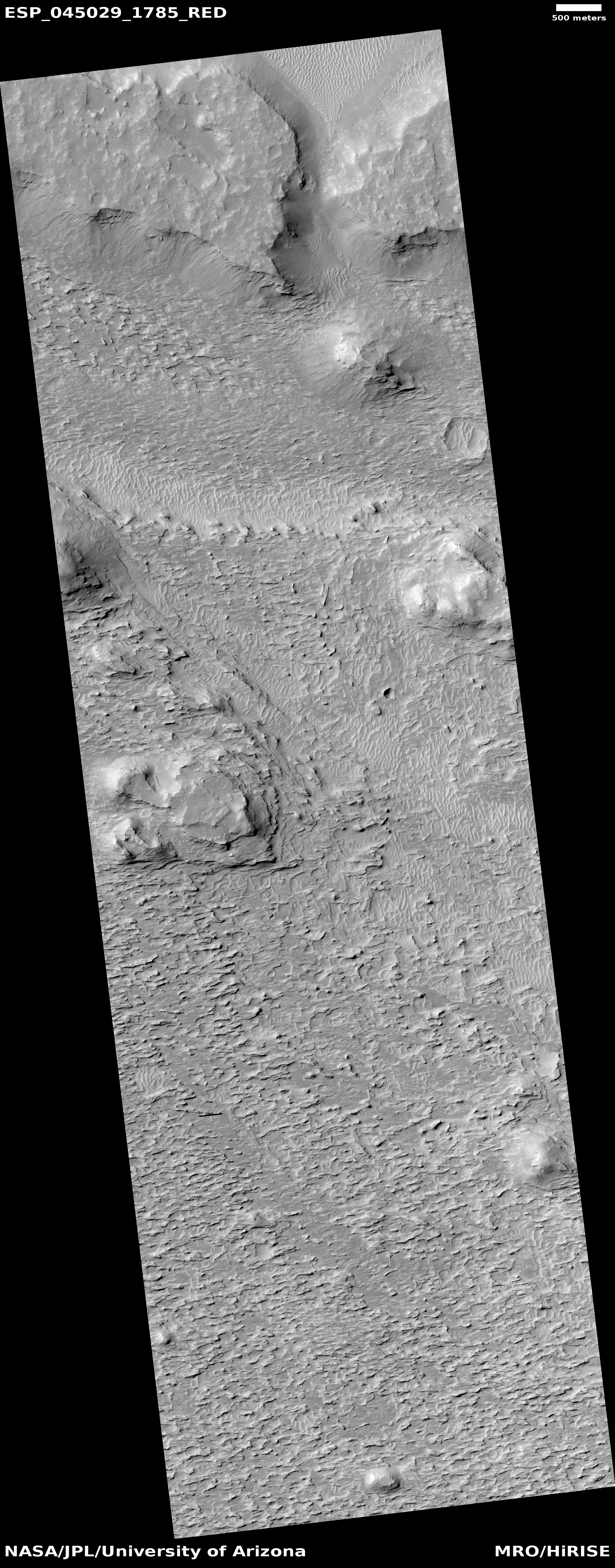
Wide view of layered terrain, as seen by HiRISE under HiWish program Location is northeast of Gale Crater in Aeolis quadrangle.

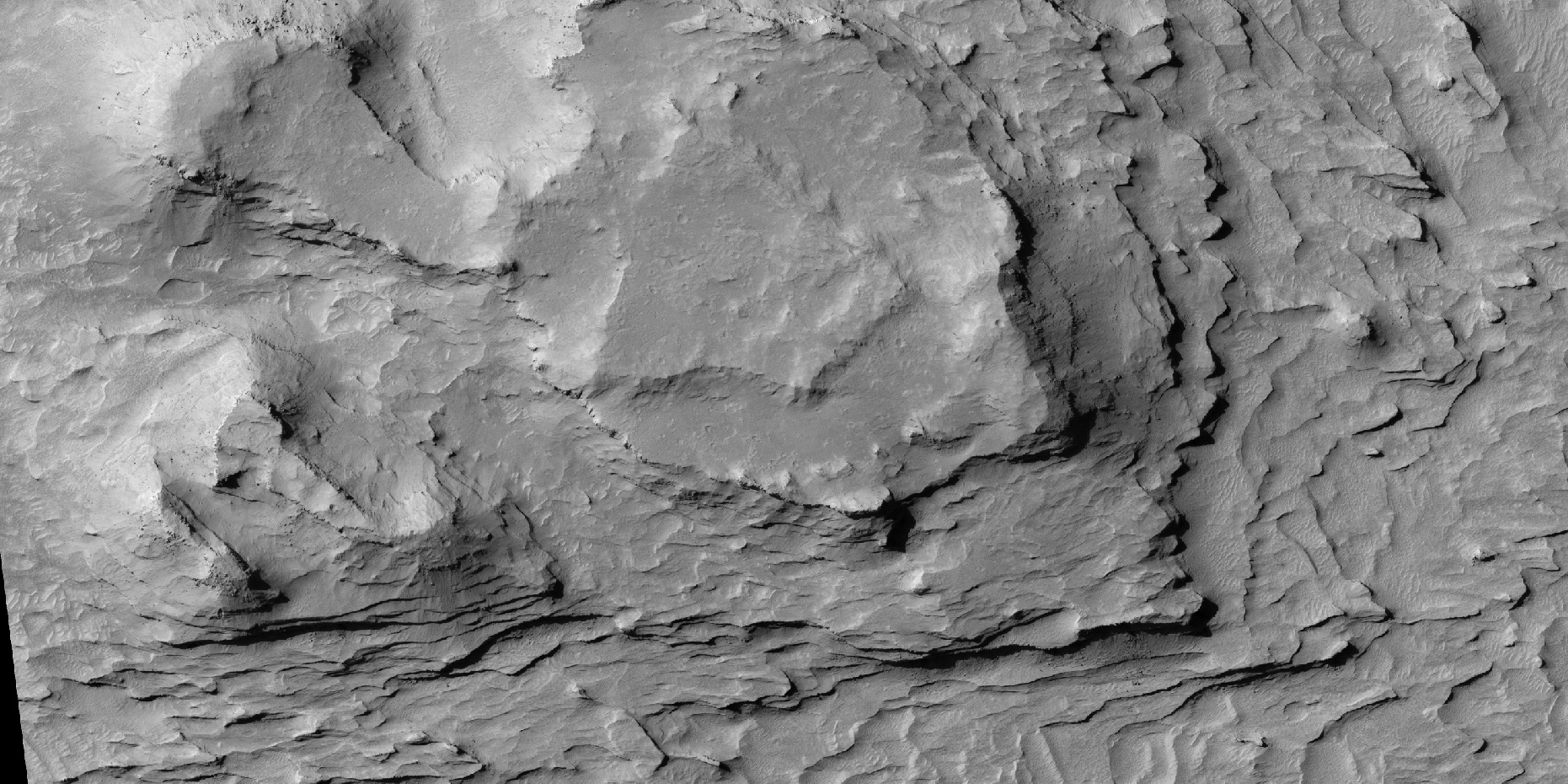
Close view of mound with layers, as seen by HiRISE under HiWish program Note: this is an enlargement from the previous image.

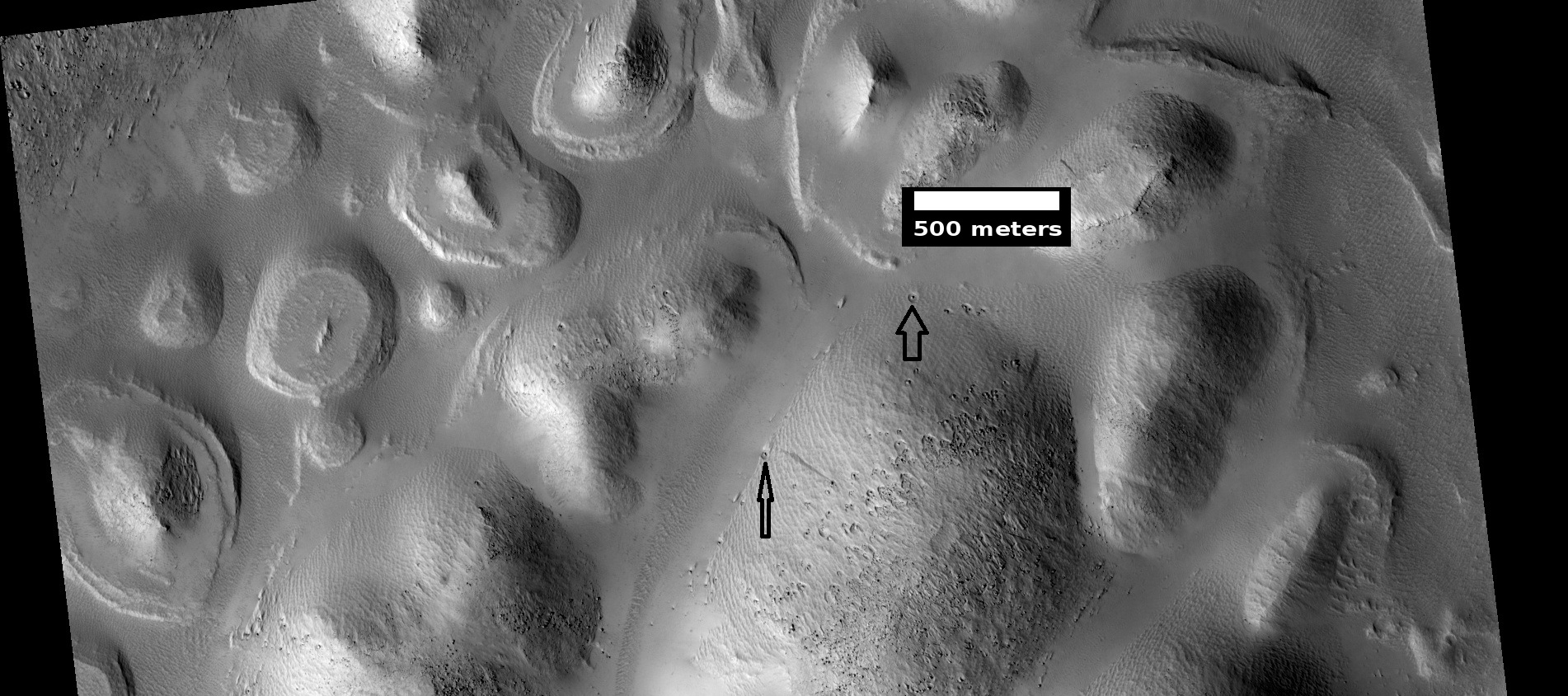
Layers exposed at the base of a group of buttes in Mangala Valles in Memnonia quadrangle, as seen by HiRISE under HiWish program. Arrows point to boulders sitting in pits. The pits may have formed by winds, heat from the boulders melting ground ice, or some other process.

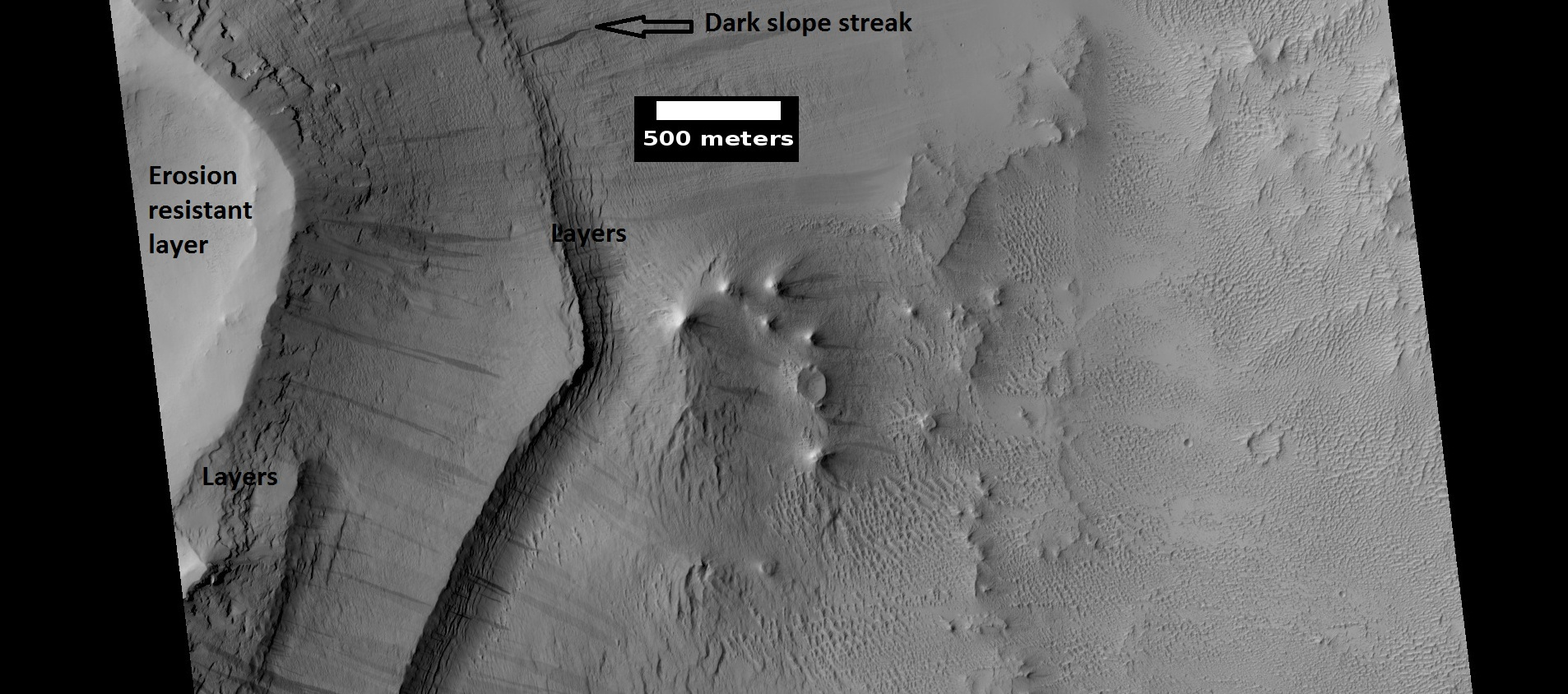
Layers under cap rock of a pedestal crater, as seen by HiRISE under HiWish program. Pedestal crater is within the much larger Tikhonravov Crater.

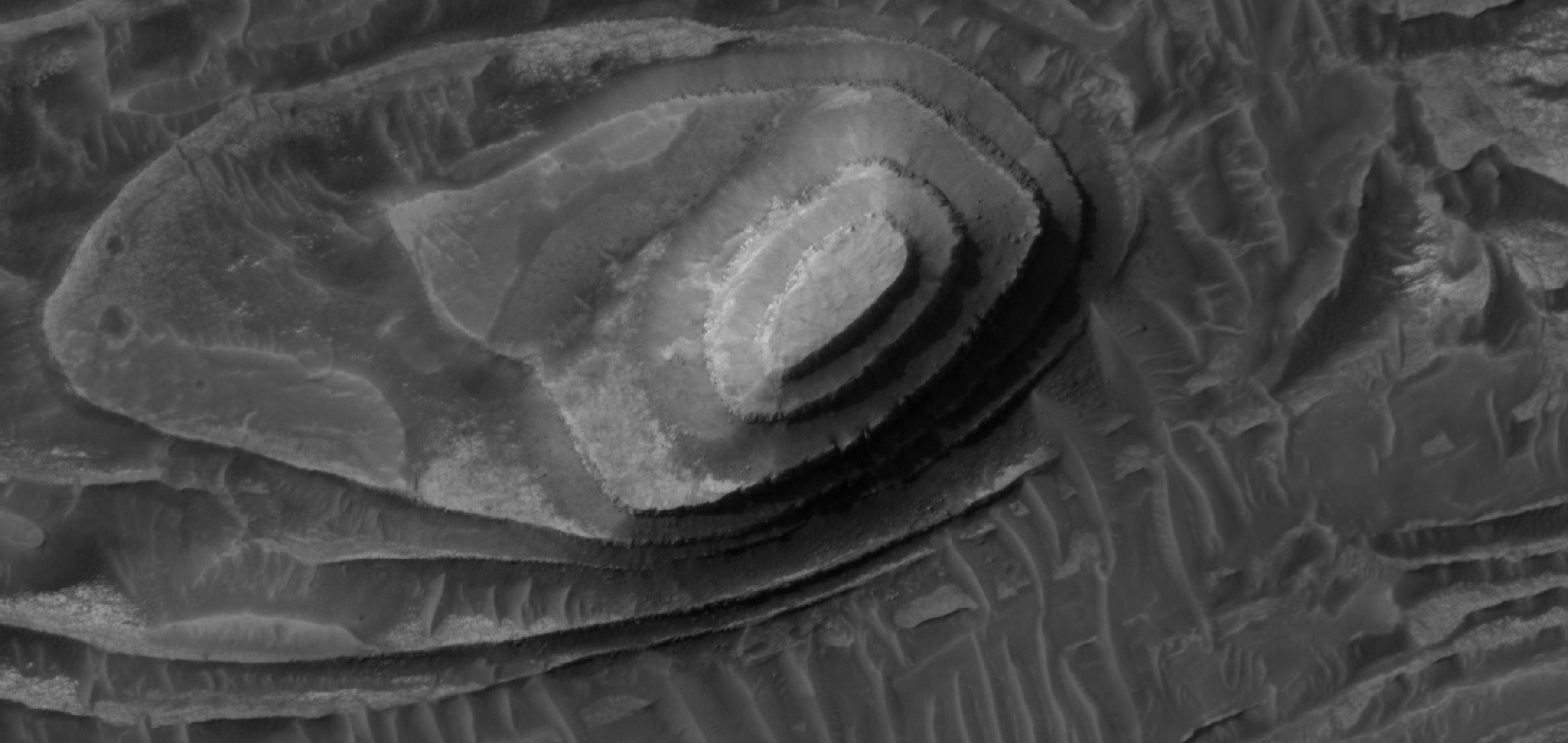
Butte in Crommelin Crater, as seen by HiRISE under HiWish program. Location is Oxia Palus quadrangle.

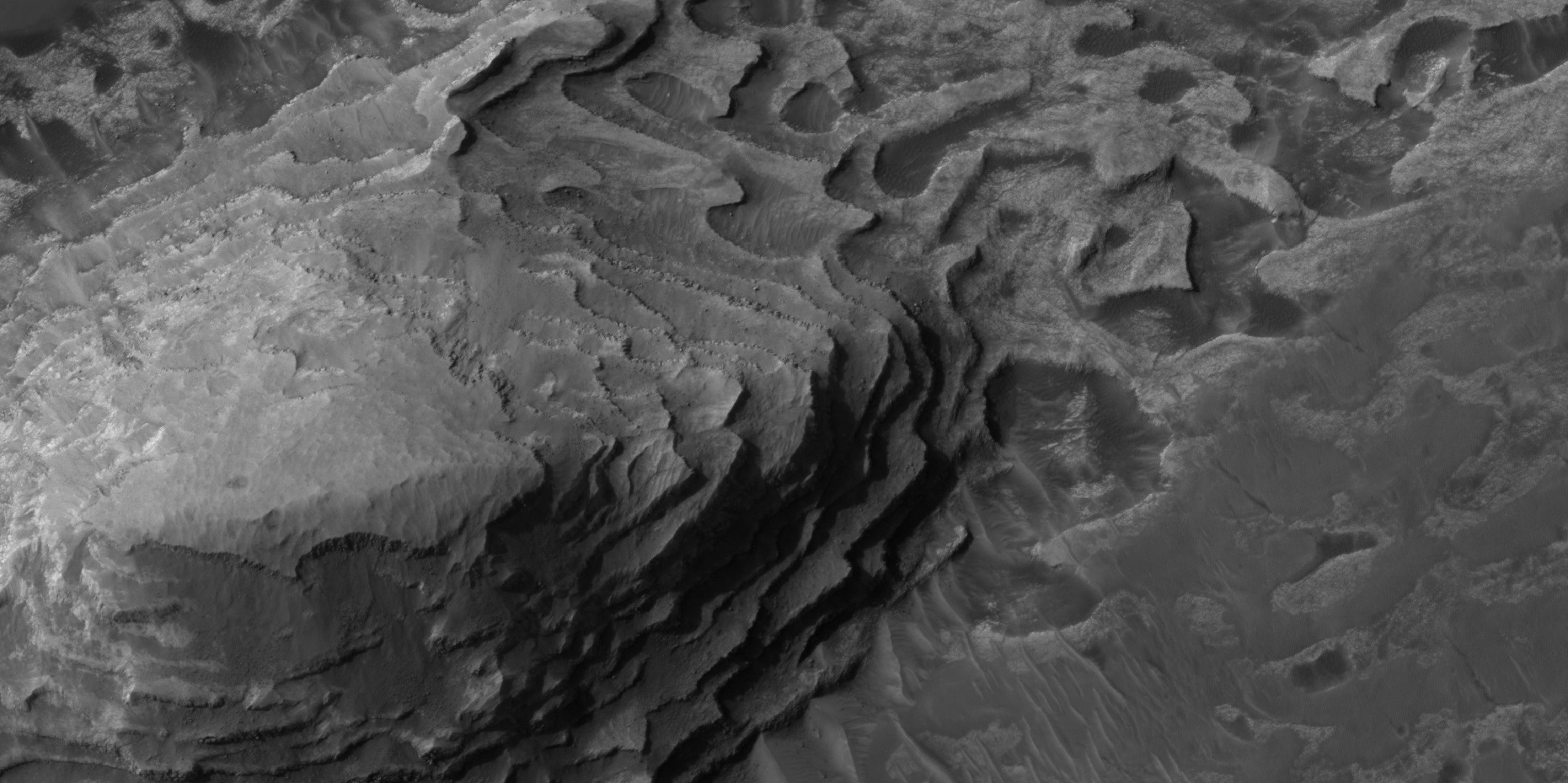
Layers in Crommelin Crater, as seen by HiRISE under HiWish program. Location is Oxia Palus quadrangle.

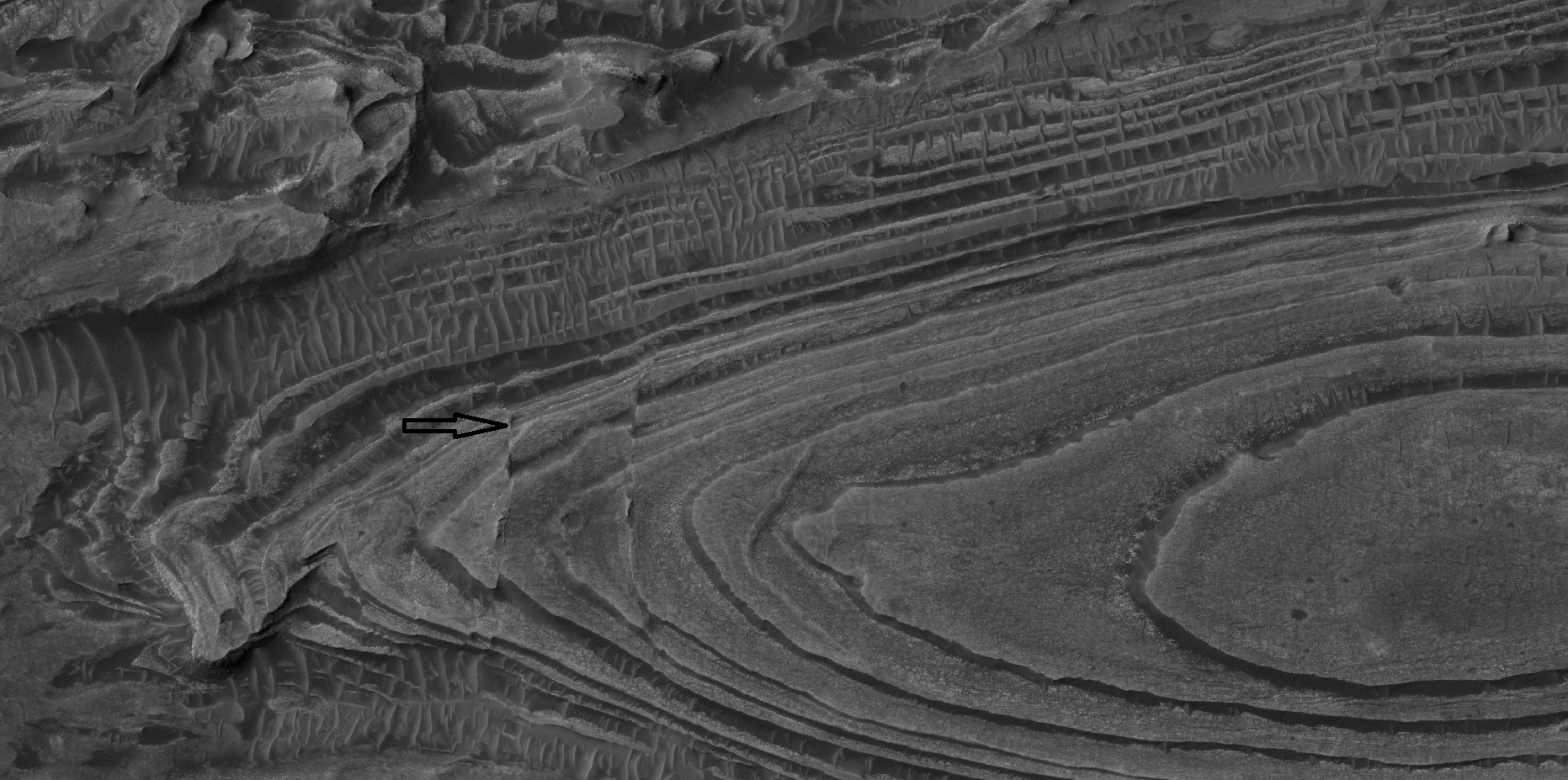
Layers in Crommelin Crater, as seen by HiRISE under HiWish program. Arrow indicates fault. Location is Oxia Palus quadrangle.
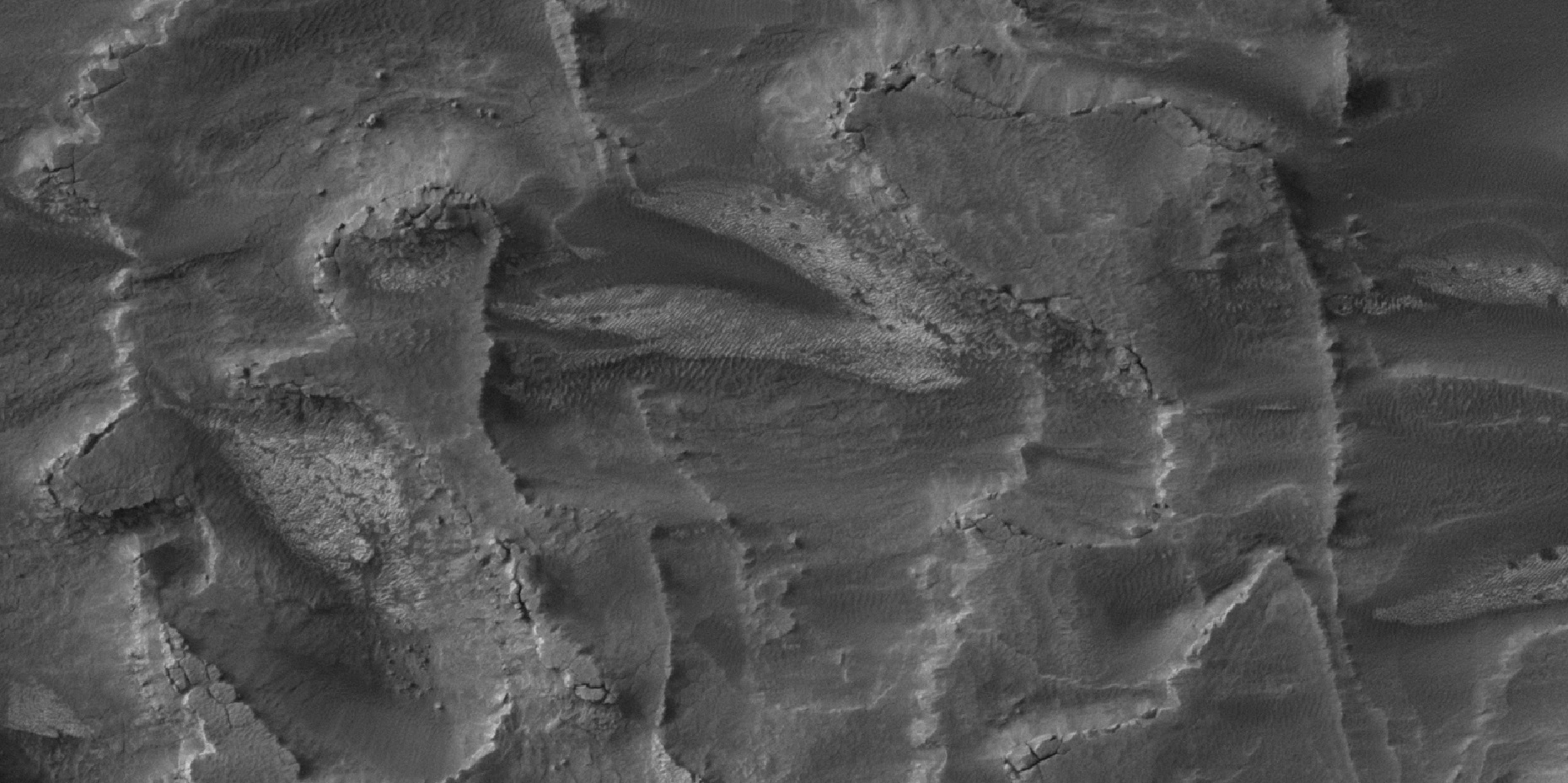
Layers breaking up into boulders in Galle Crater, as seen by HiRISE under HiWish program Location is Argyre quadrangle.

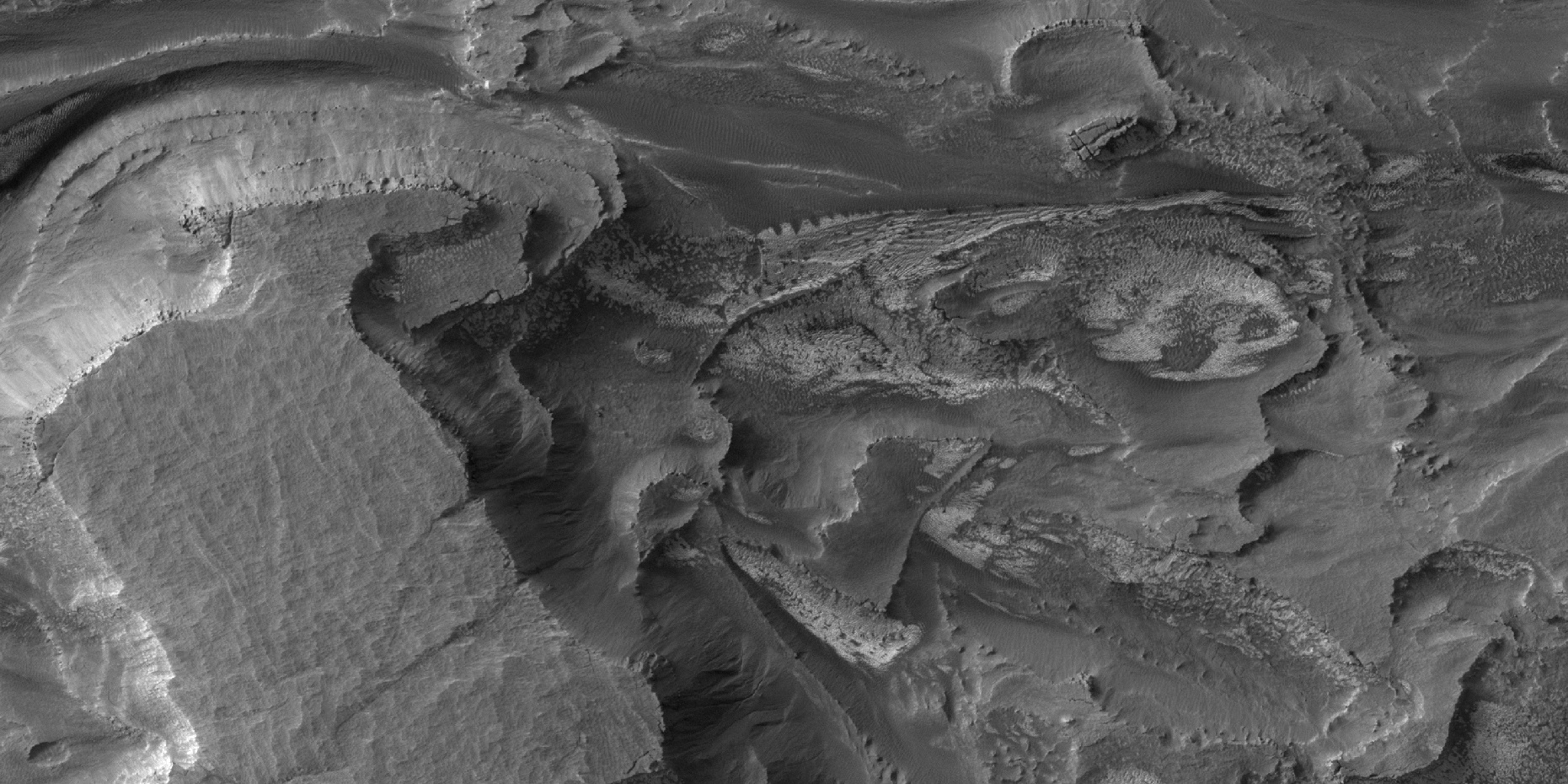
Layers and gullies in Galle Crater, as seen by HiRISE under HiWish program Location is Argyre quadrangle.

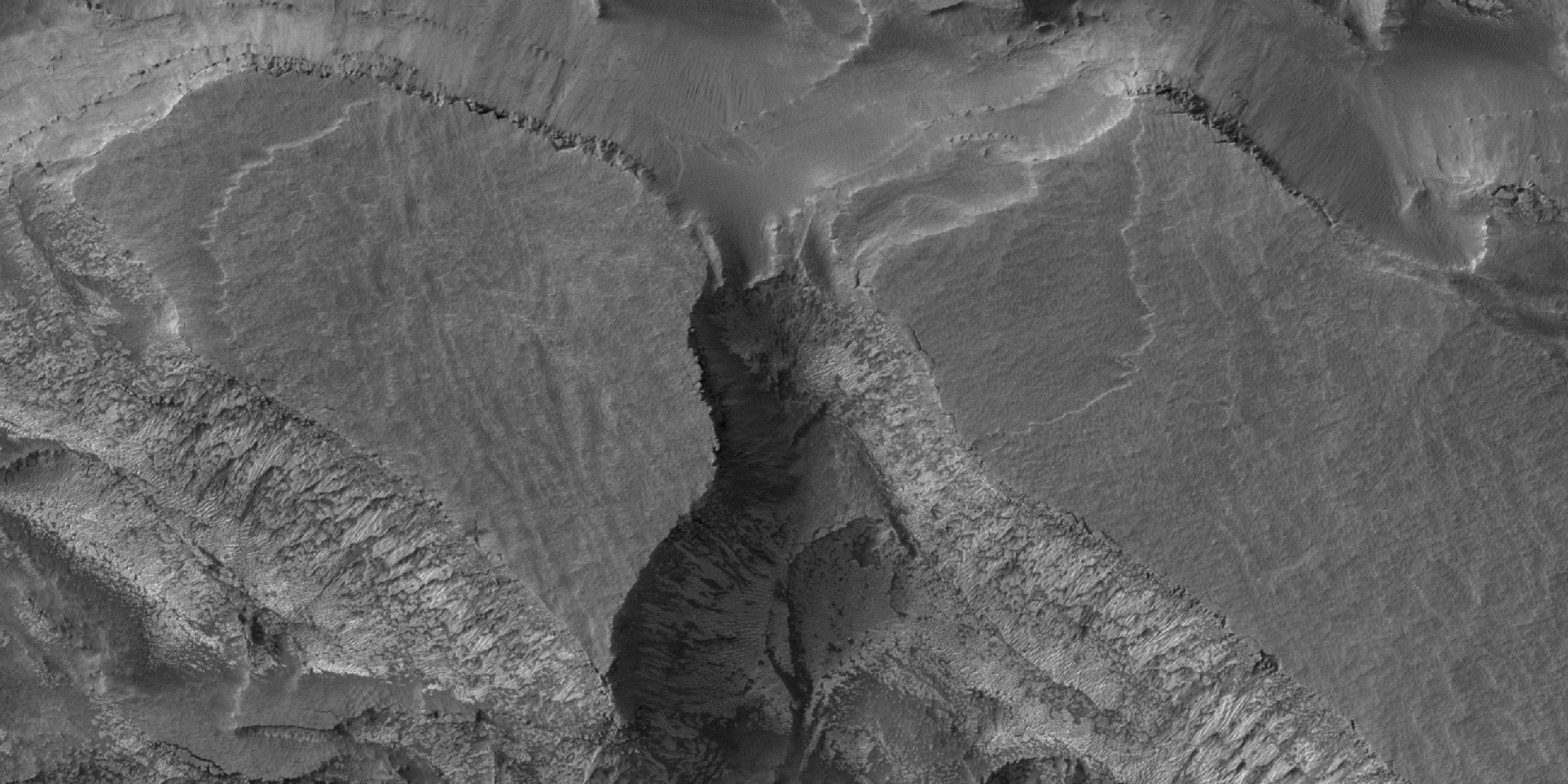
Close view of layers in mound in Galle Crater, as seen by HiRISE under HiWish program Location is Argyre quadrangle.
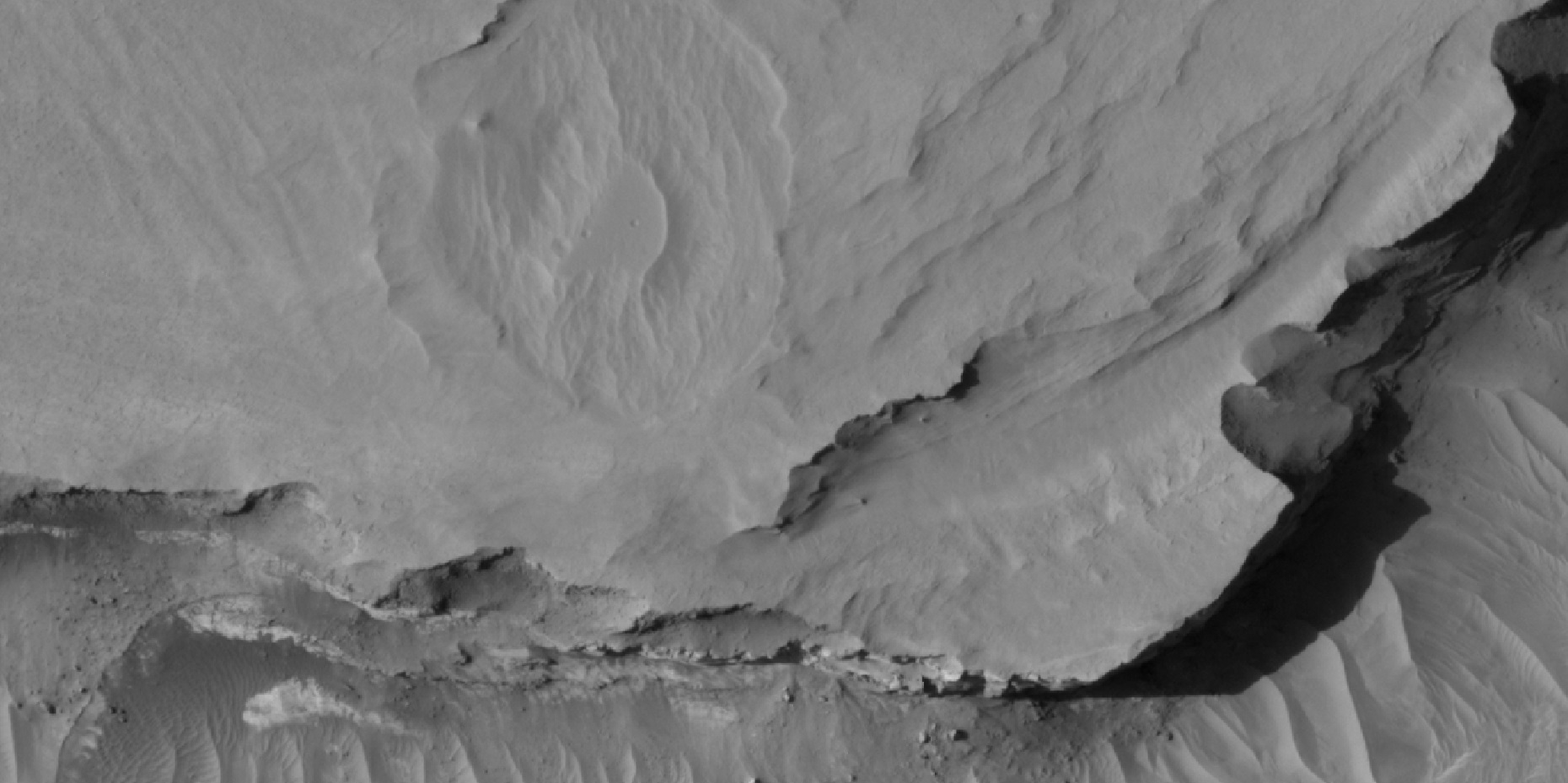
Close view of layers, as seen by HiRISE under HiWish program At least one layer is light-toned which may indicated hydrated minerals. Location is Arabia quadrangle.
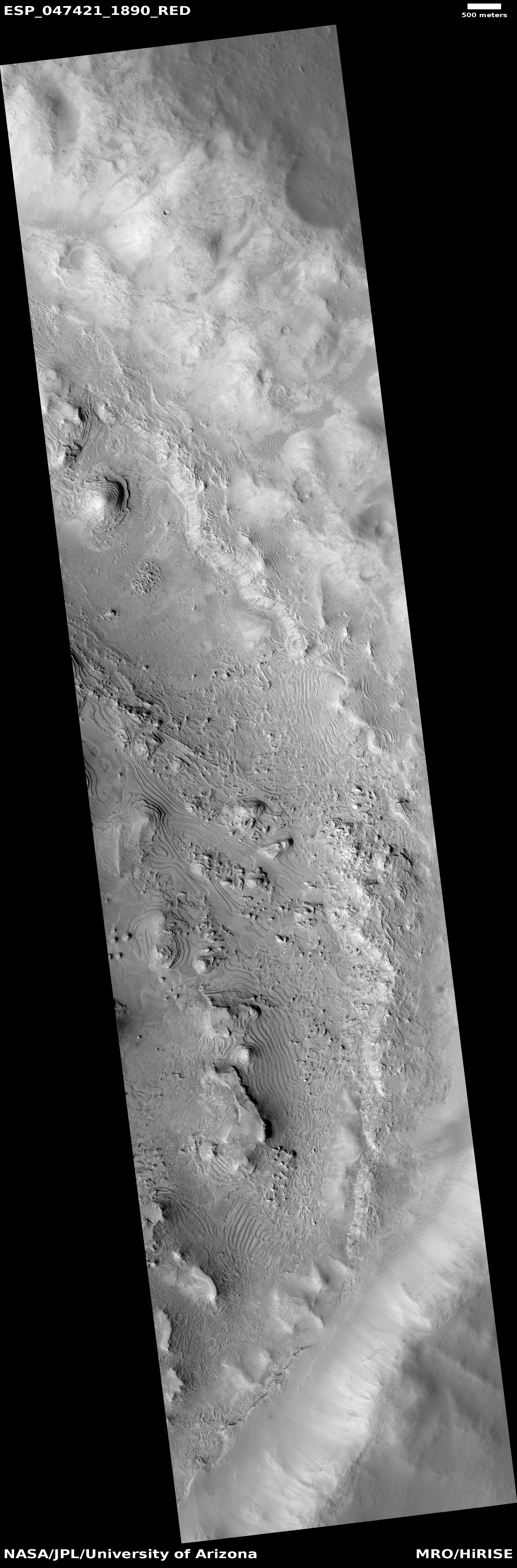
Wide view of layers in crater, as seen by HiRISE under HiWish program parts of this image are enlarged in other images that follow.

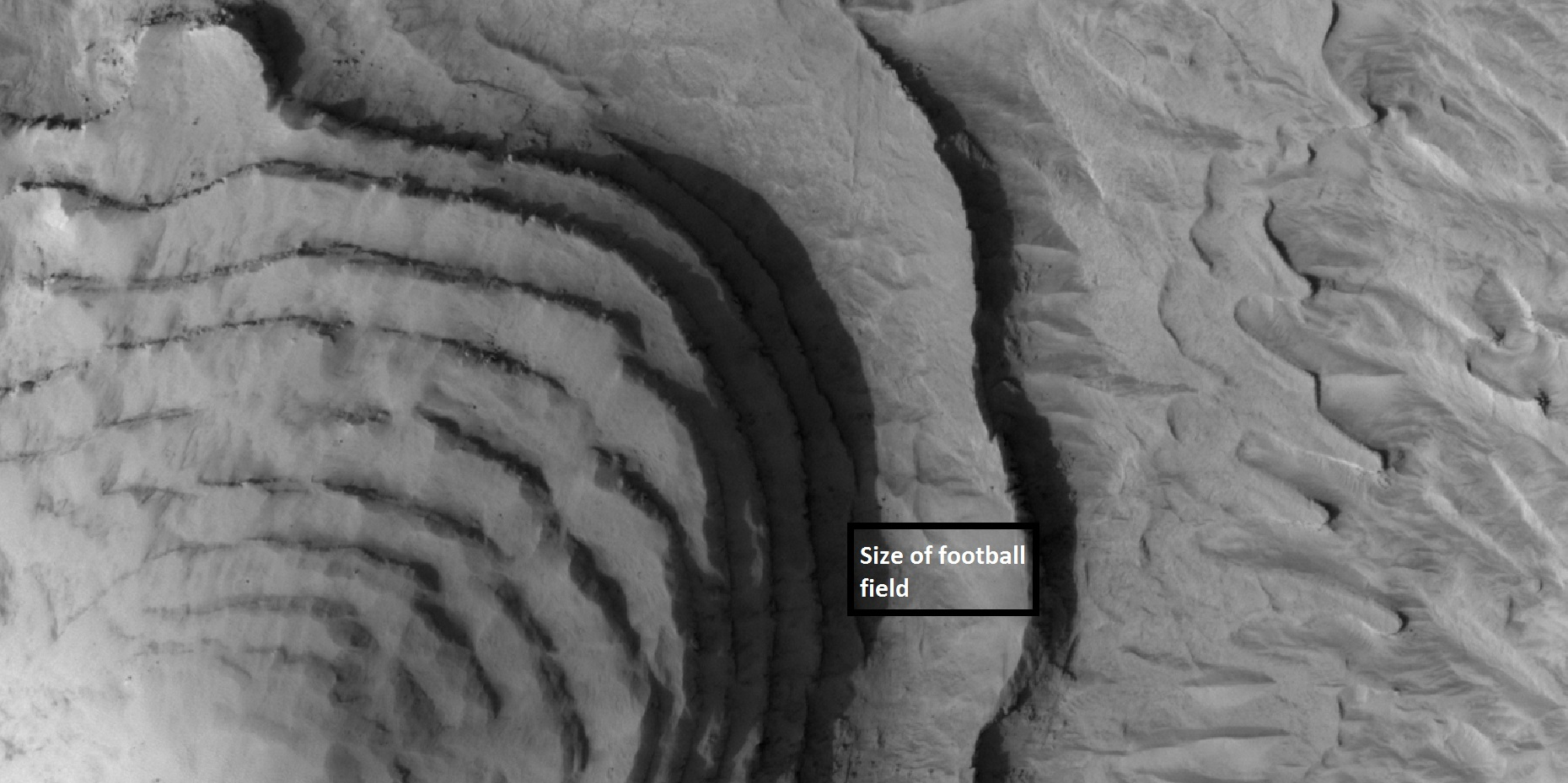
Close view of layers, as seen by HiRISE under HiWish program Box shows the size of a football field.

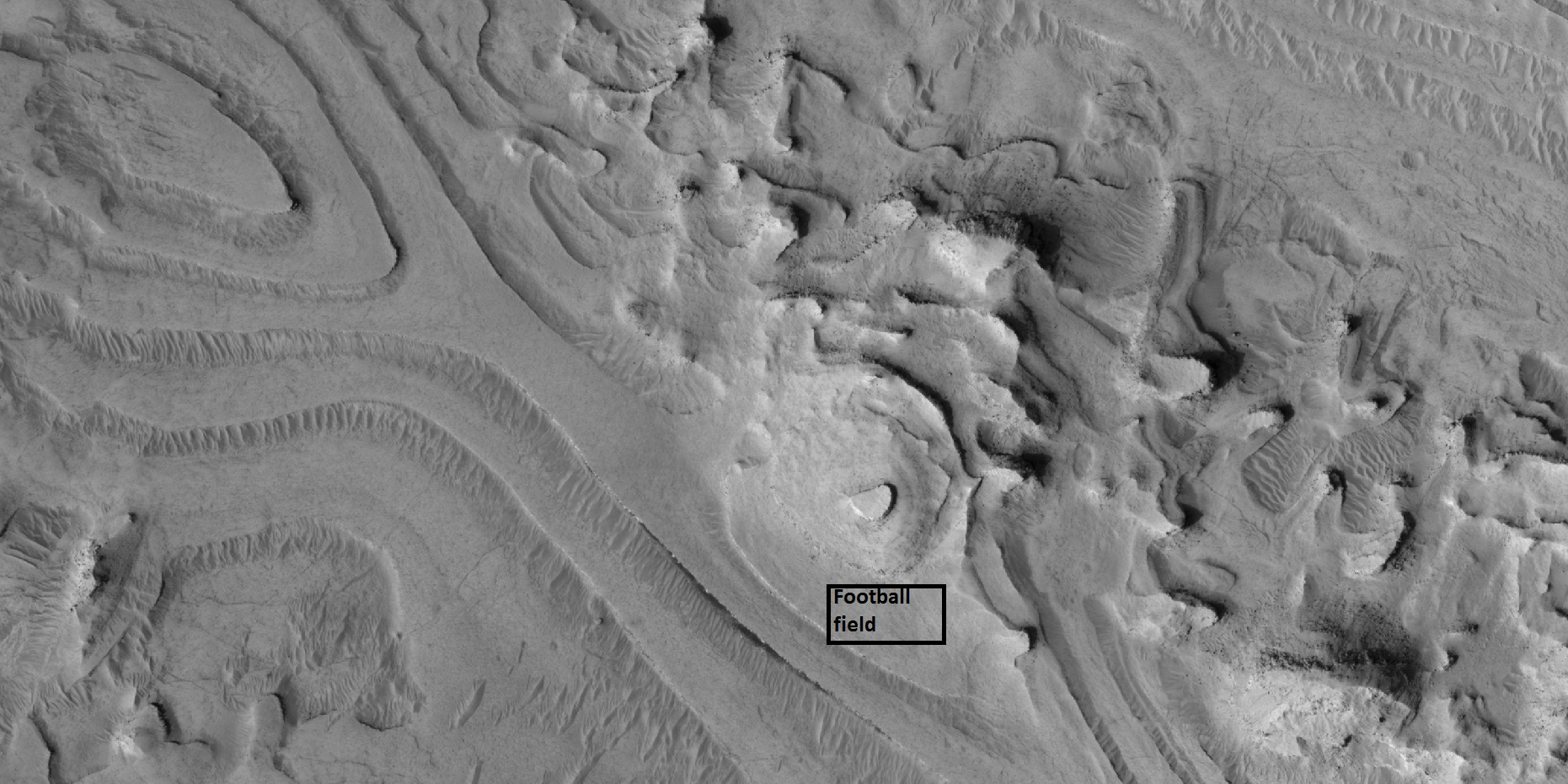
Close view of layers, as seen by HiRISE under HiWish program Box shows the size of a football field.

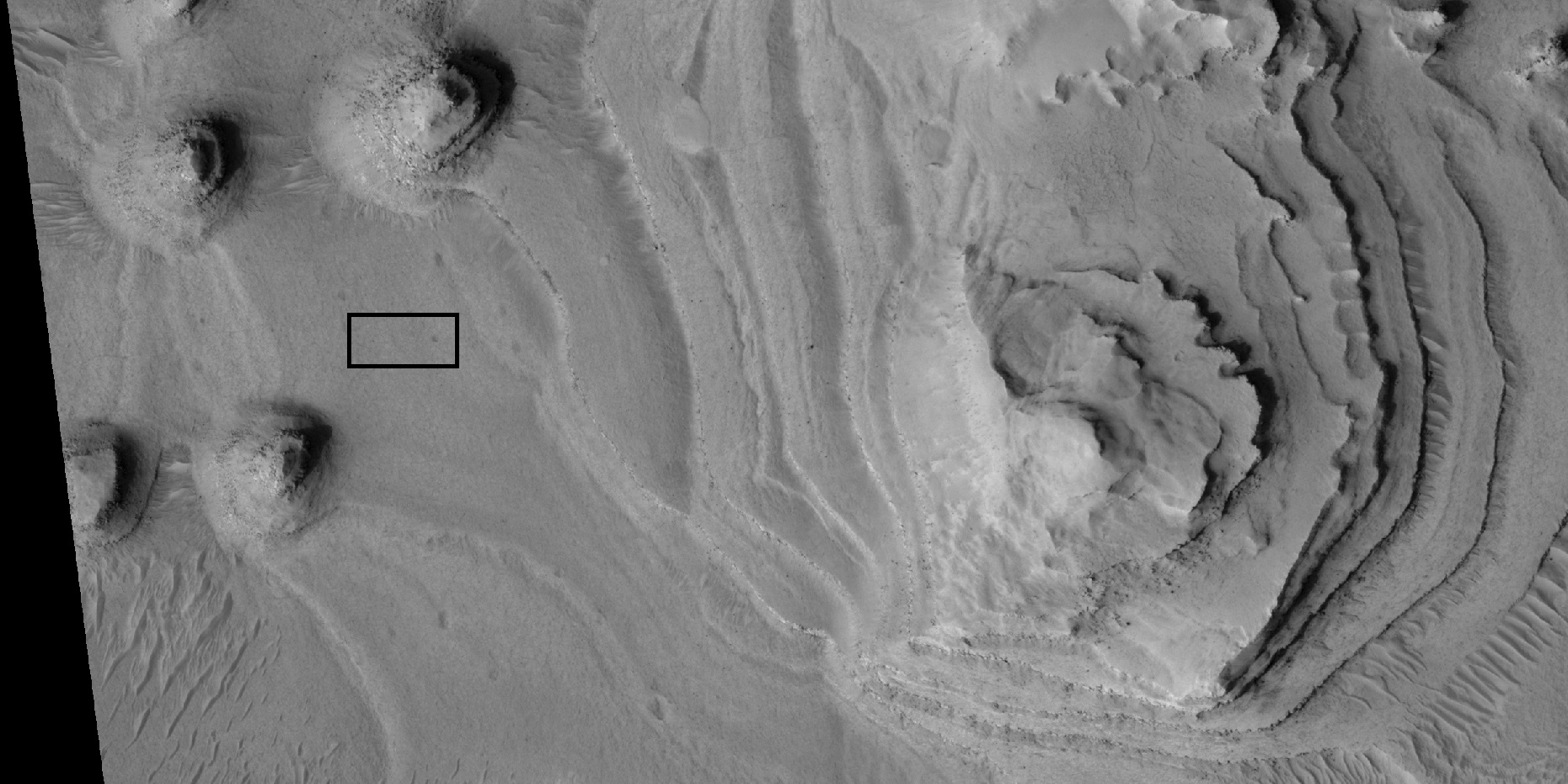
Close view of layers, as seen by HiRISE under HiWish program Box shows the size of a football field.

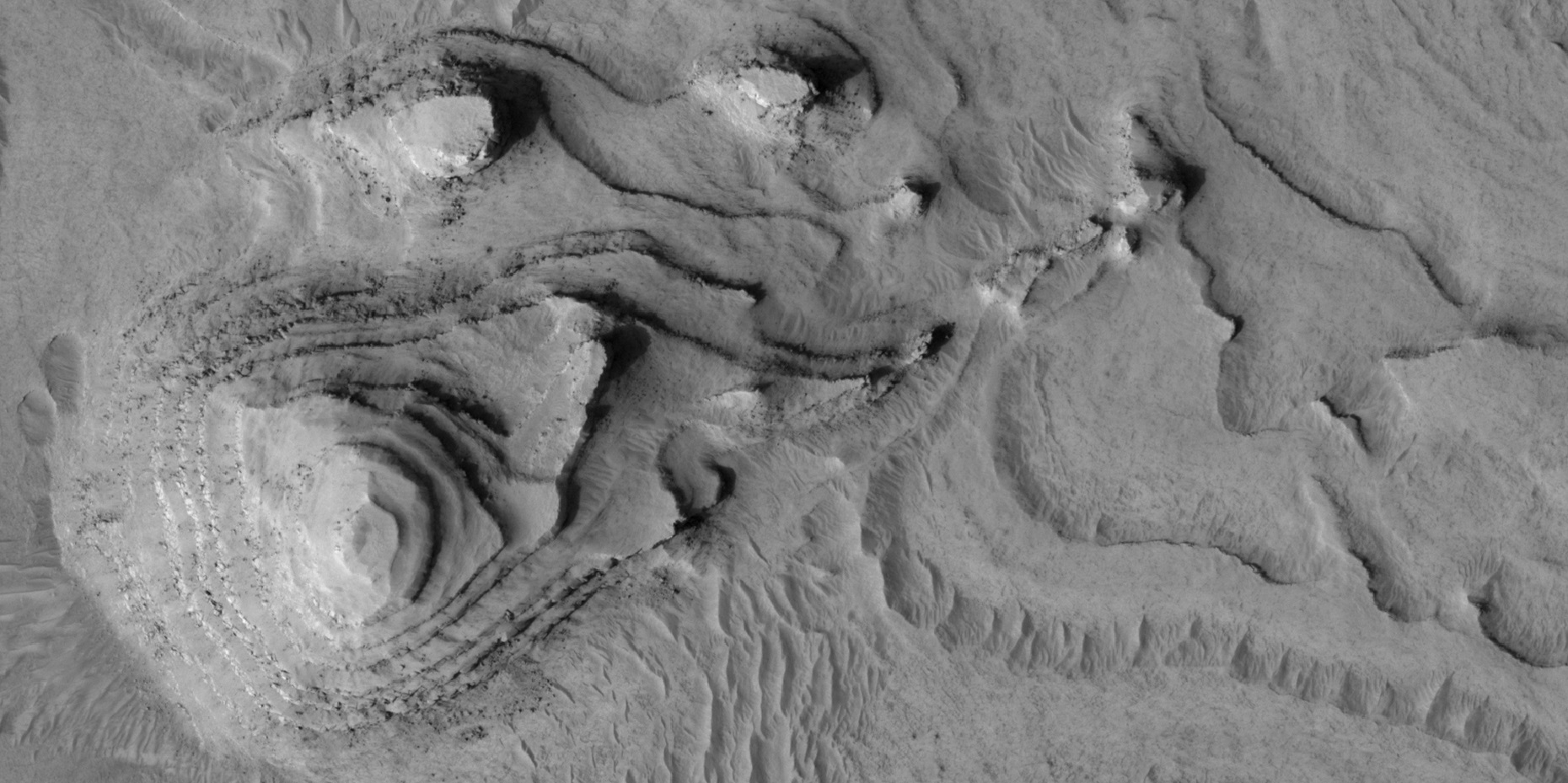
Close view of layers, as seen by HiRISE under HiWish program

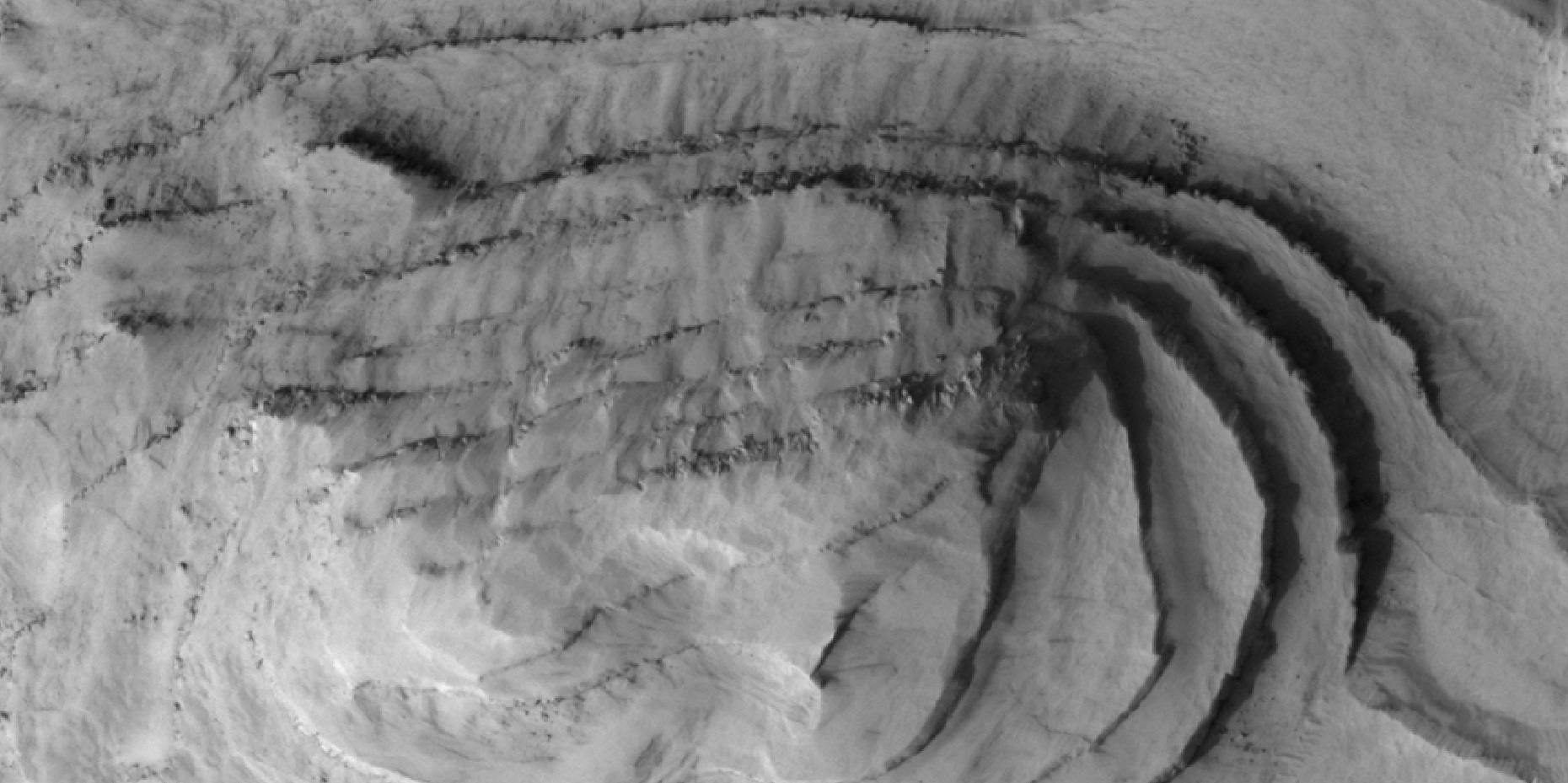
Close view of layers, as seen by HiRISE under HiWish program
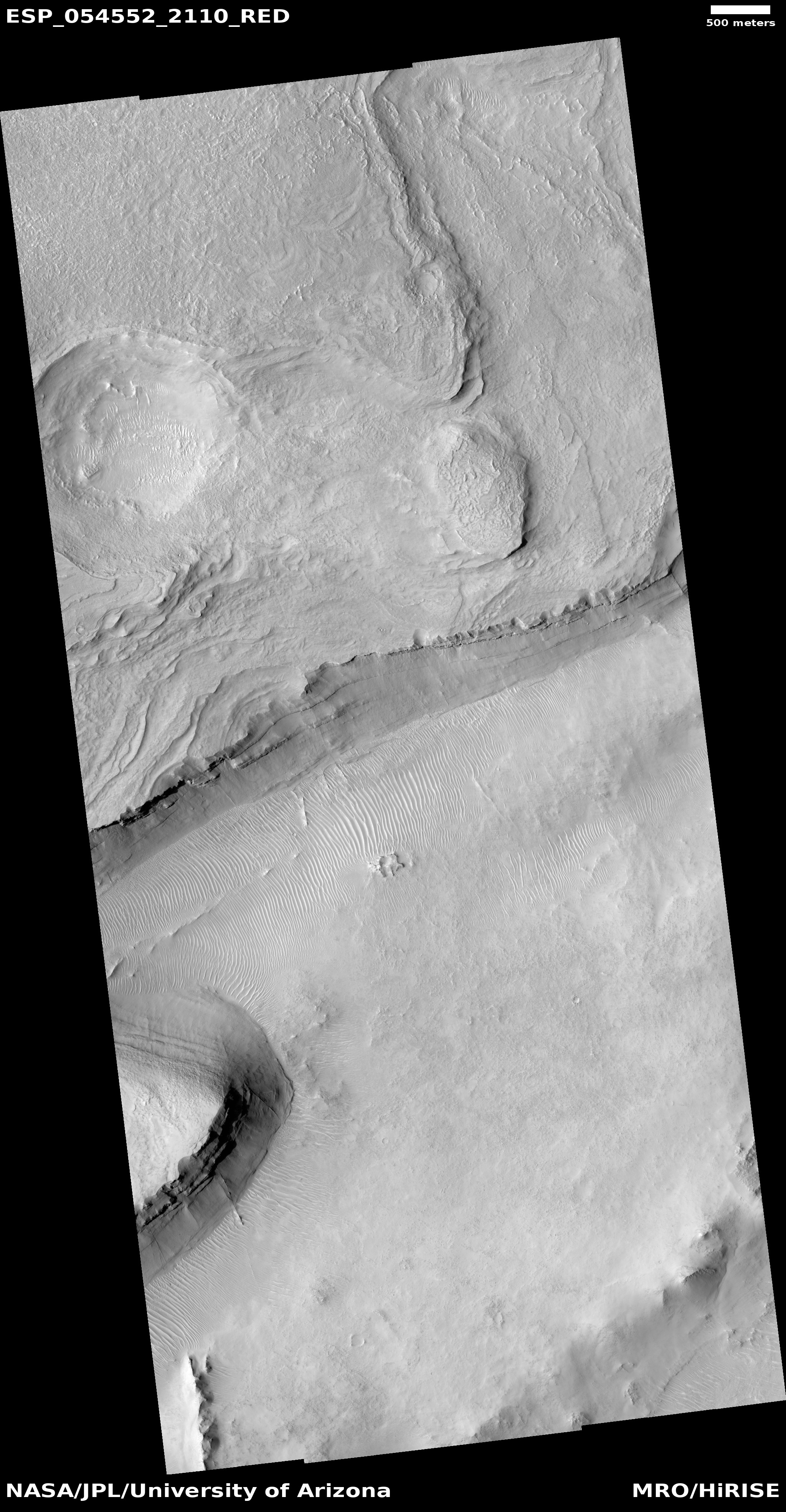
Wide view of layers, as seen by HiRISE under HiWish program

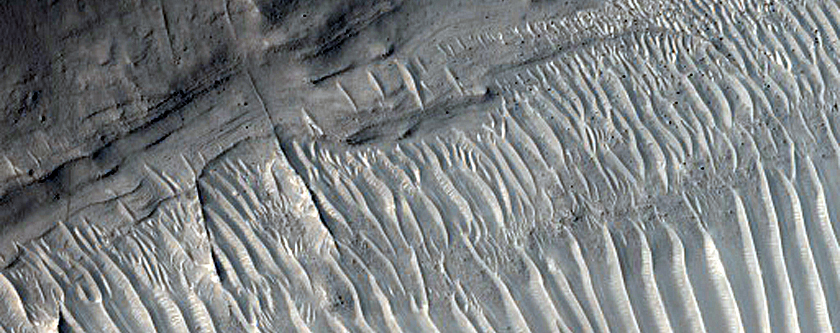
Close view of layers, as seen by HiRISE under HiWish program A ridge cuts across the layers at a right angle.

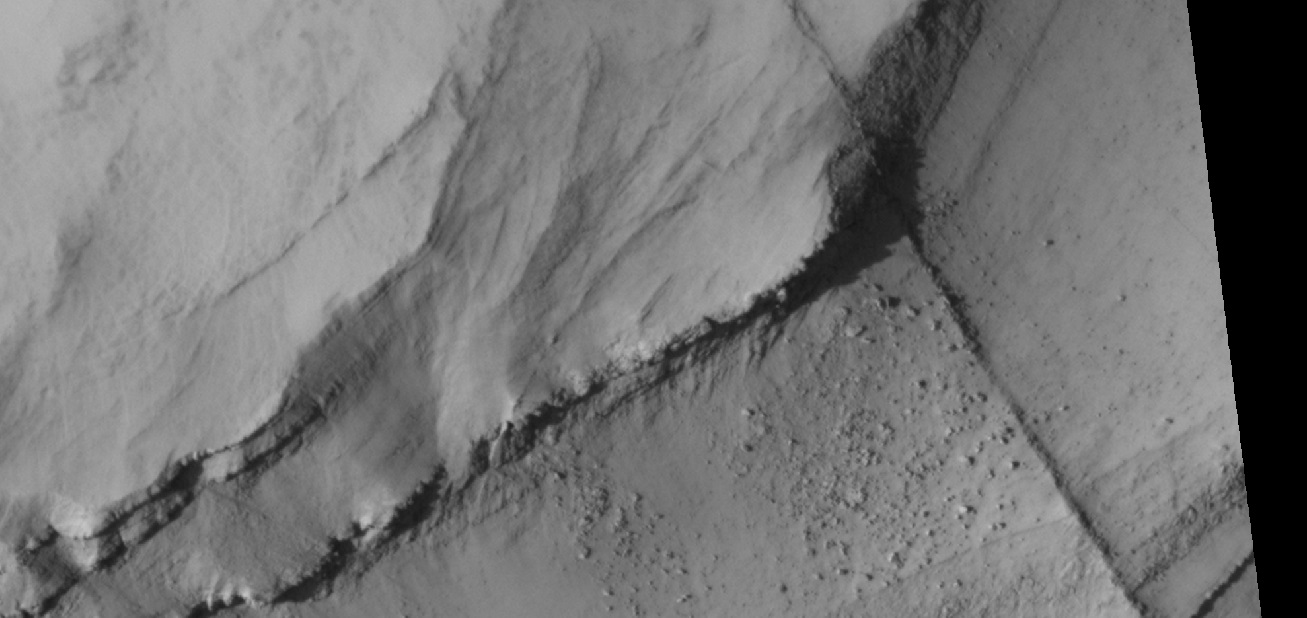
Close view of layers, as seen by HiRISE under HiWish program A ridge cuts across the layers at a right angle.

== Layers in Ice Cap ==
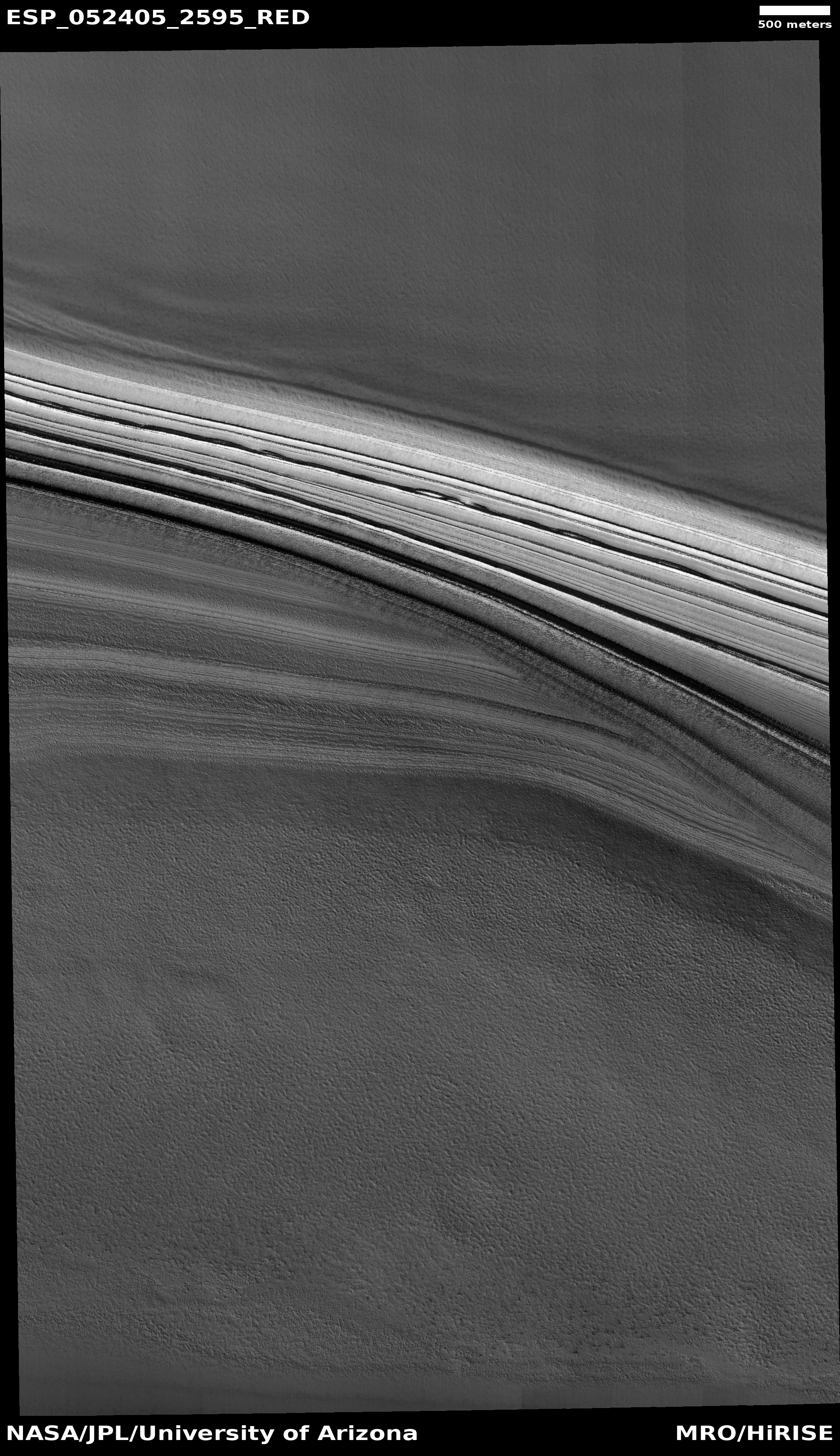
Layers in northern ice cap with an angular unconformity, as seen by HiRISE under HiWish program

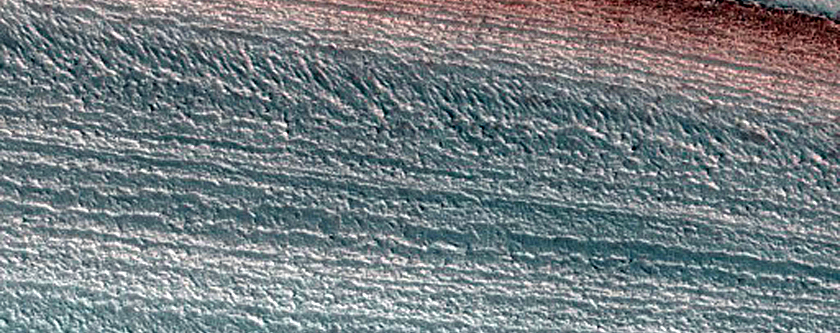
Close, color view of layers in northern ice cap, as seen by HiRISE under HiWish program

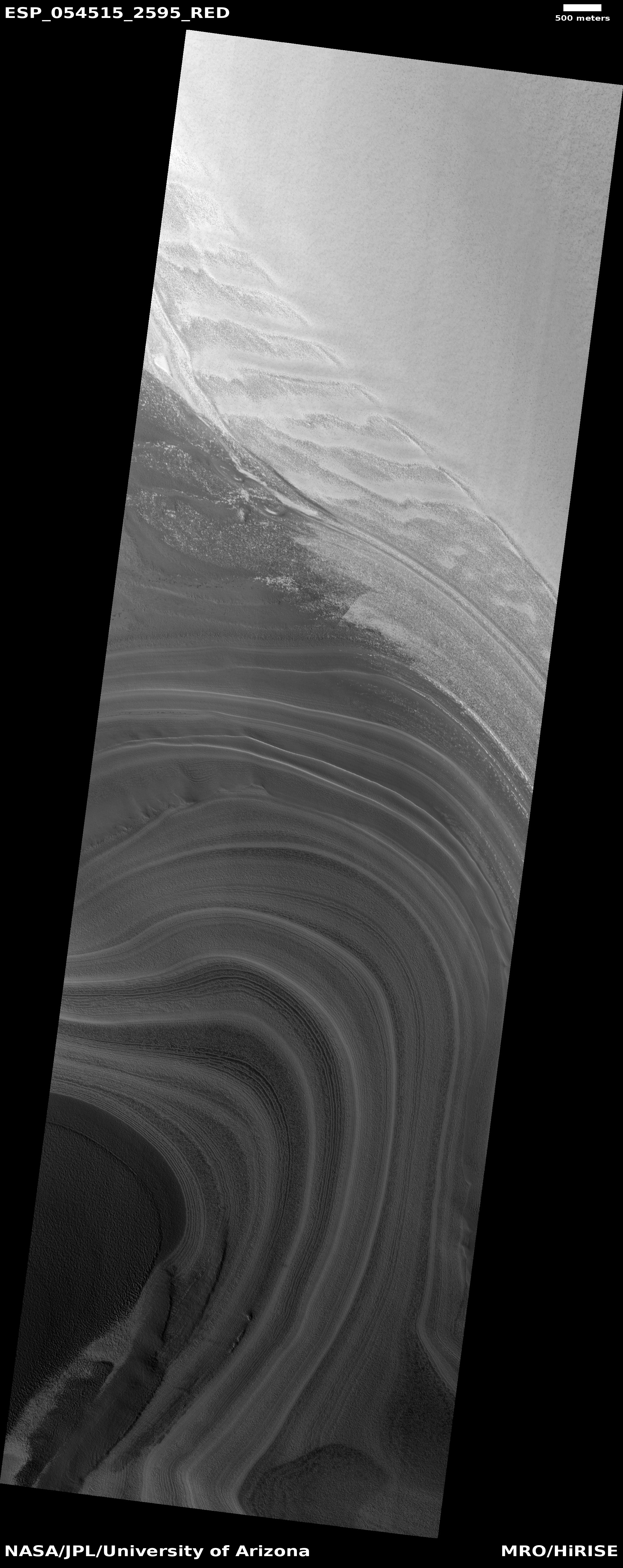
Layers exposed in northern ice cap, as seen by HiRISE under HiWish program

== Sand dunes ==
Many locations on Mars have sand dunes. An erg (or sand sea), made up of aeolian dune fields referred to as the Circumpolar Dune Field surrounds most of the north polar cap. The dunes are covered by a seasonal carbon dioxide frost that forms in early autumn and remains until late spring. Many martian dunes strongly resemble terrestrial dunes but images acquired by the High-Resolution Imaging Science Experiment on the Mars Reconnaissance Orbiter have shown that Martian dunes in the north polar region are subject to modification via grainflow triggered by seasonal CO_{2} sublimation, a process not seen on Earth. Many dunes are black because they are derived from the dark volcanic rock basalt. Extraterrestrial sand seas such as those found on Mars are referred to as "undae" from the Latin for waves.

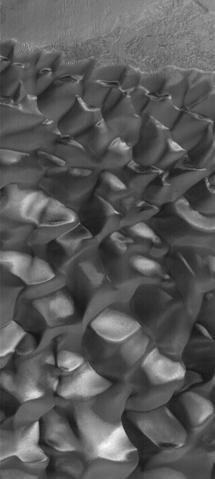
Dark dunes (probably basalt) which form a dark spot in Noachis. Picture from Mars Global Surveyor.

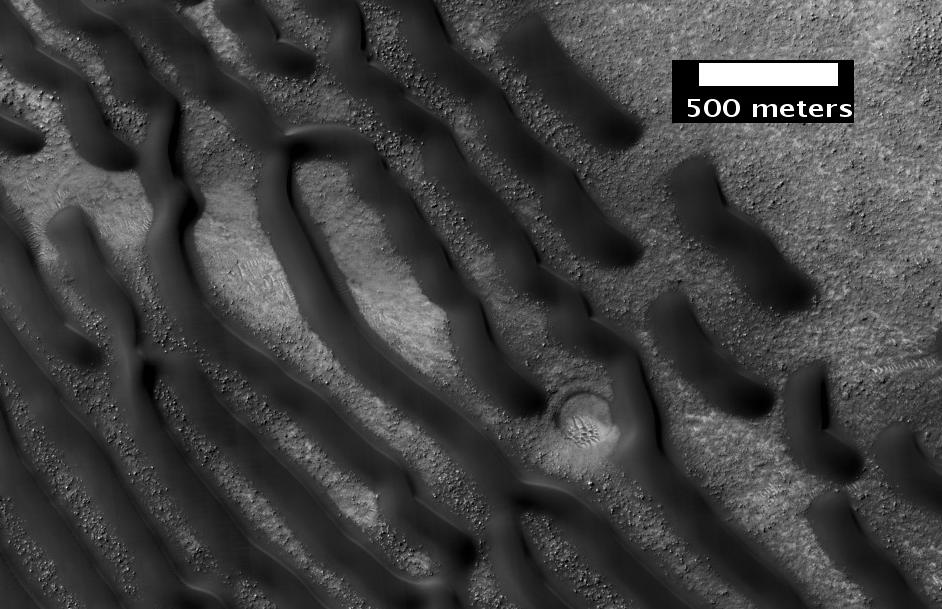
Wide view of dunes in Noachis, as seen by HiRISE.

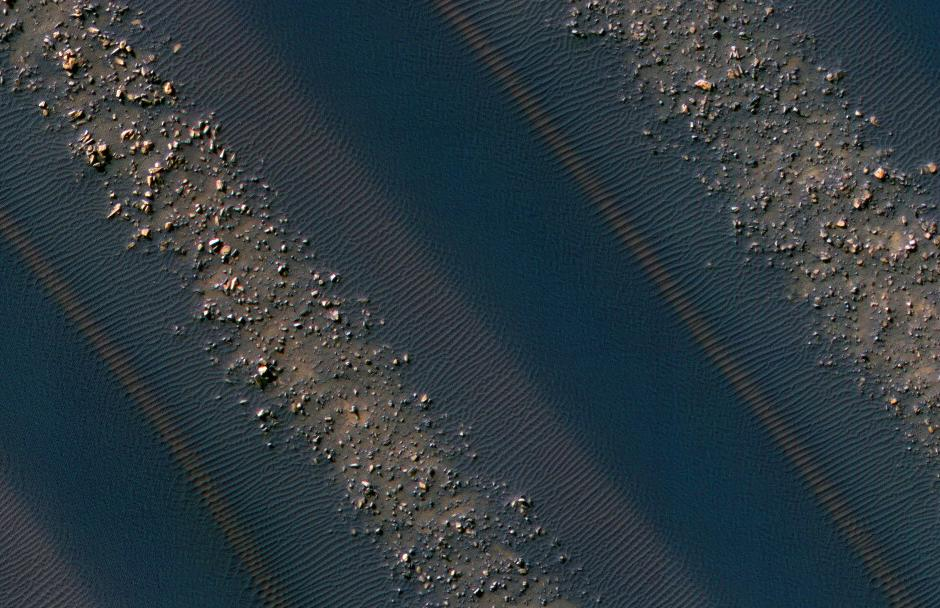
Close-up View of dunes in previous image, as seen by HiRISE. Note how sand barely covers some boulders.

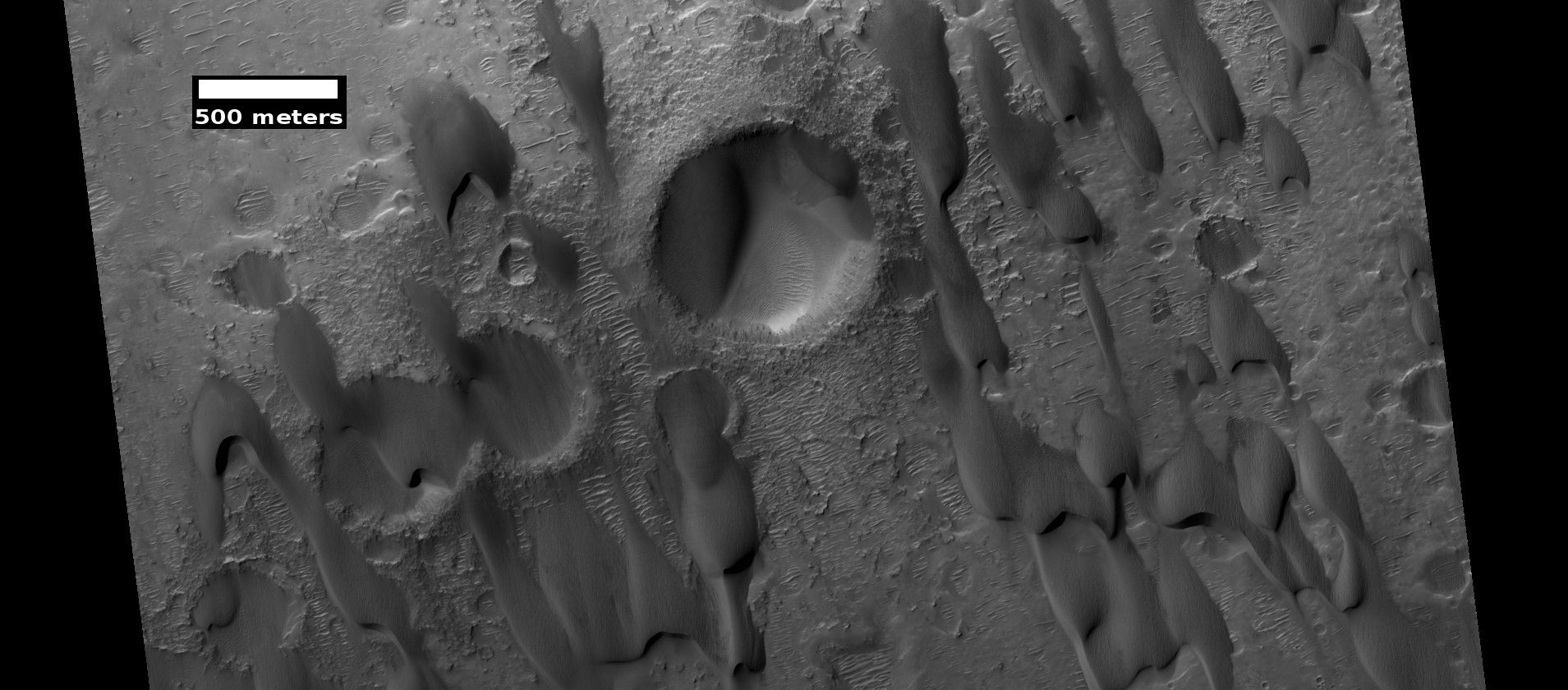
Dunes among craters, as seen by HiRISE under HiWish program. Some of these are barchans.

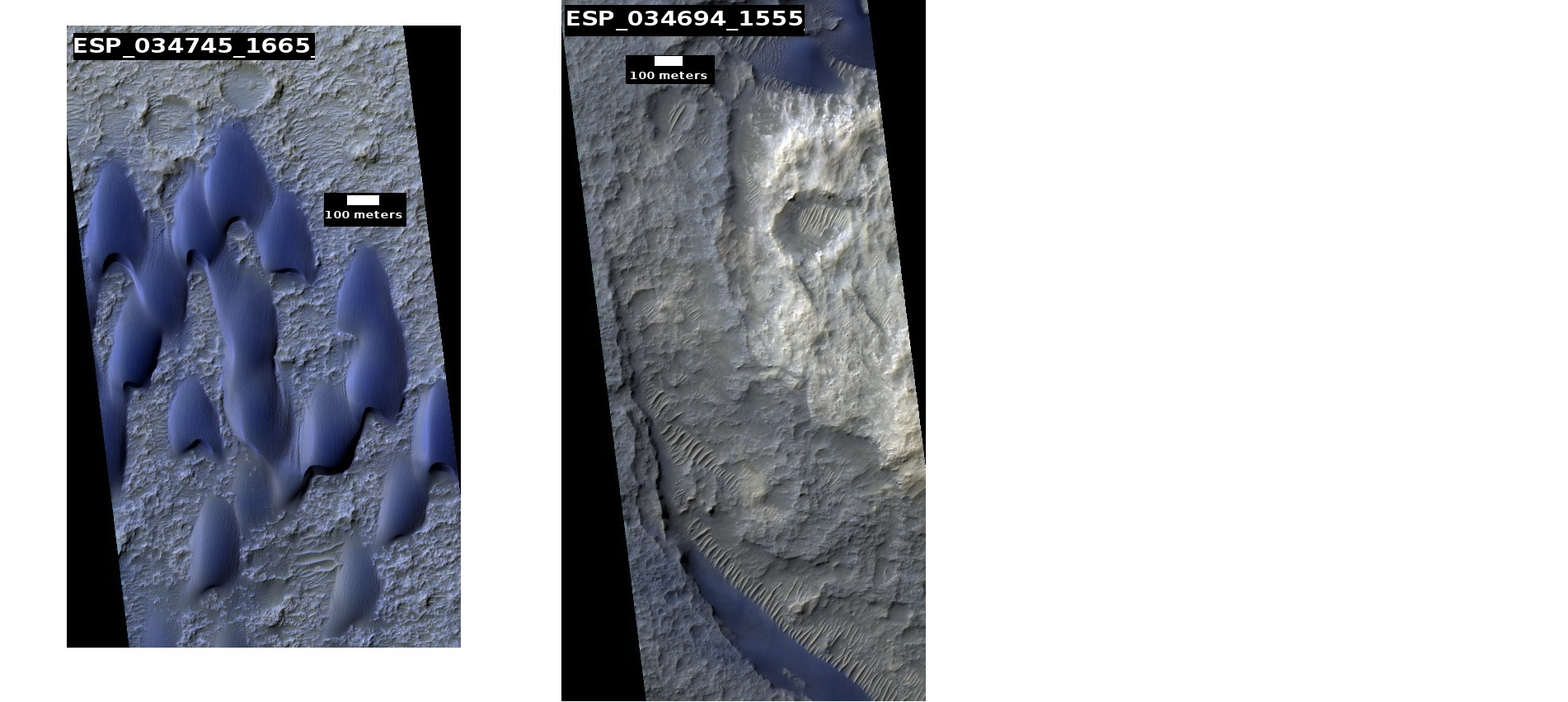
Dunes in two craters, as seen by HiRISE under the HiWish program.

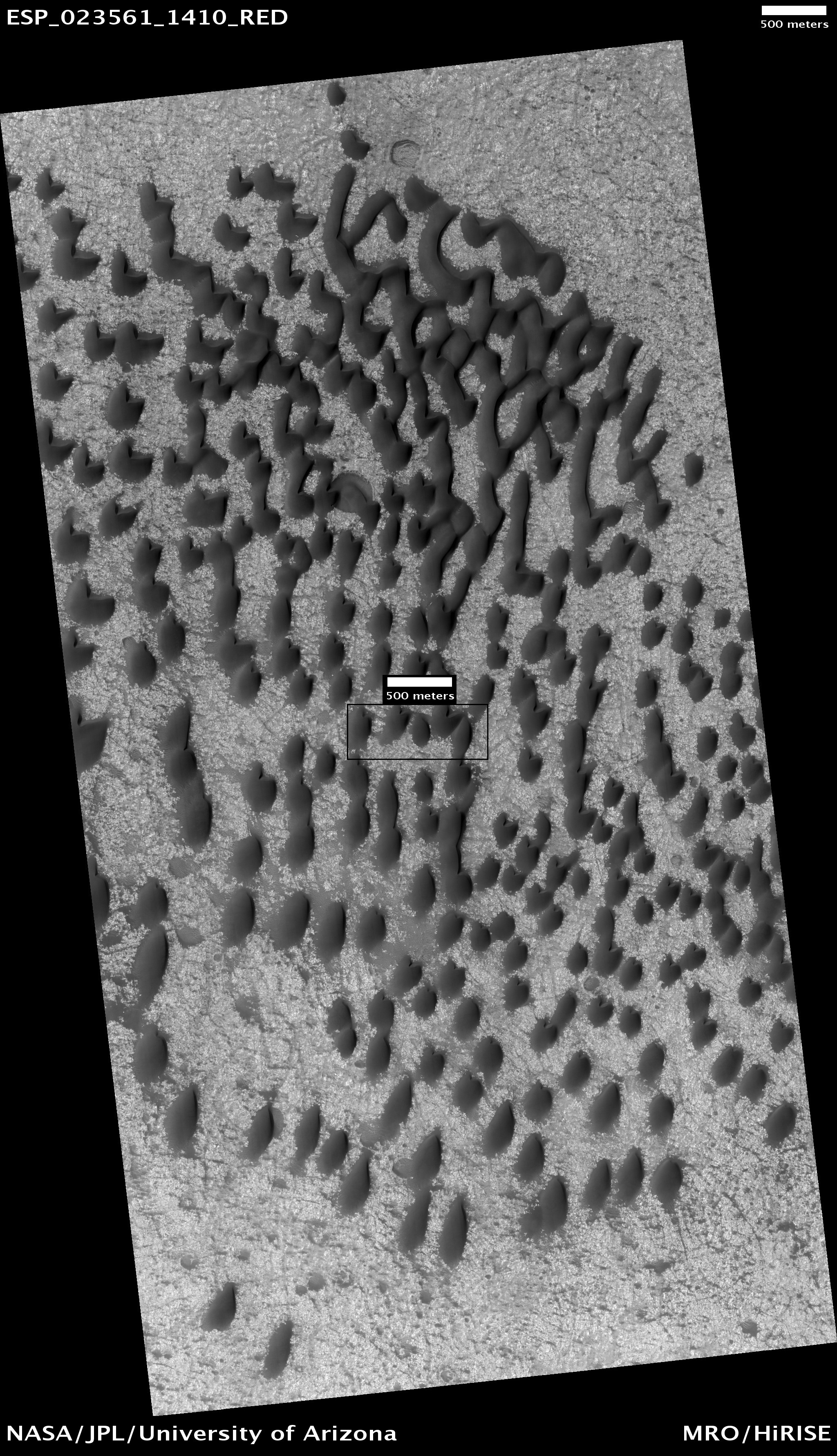
Dunes on a crater floor, as seen by HiRISE under HiWish program. Most of these are barchans. Box shows location of next image.

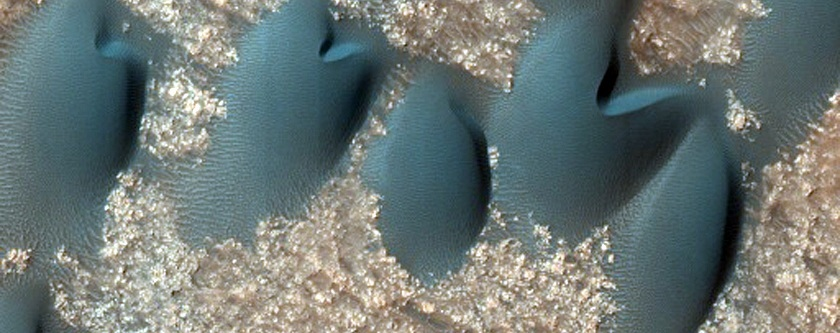
Dunes on a crater floor, as seen by HiRISE under HiWish program. Most of these are barchans. Note: this is an enlargement of the center of the previous image.

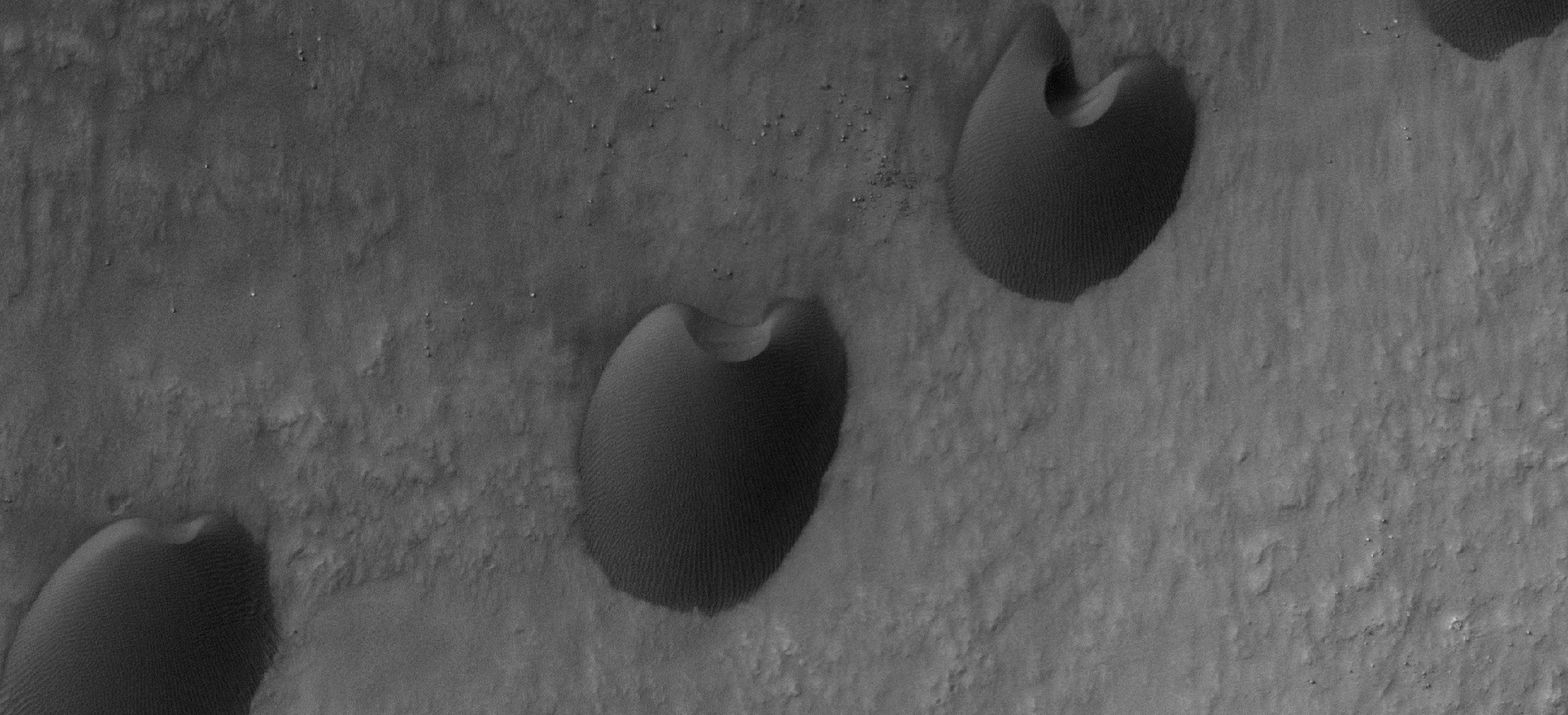
Dunes, as seen by HiRISE under HiWish program. Location is Eridania quadrangle.
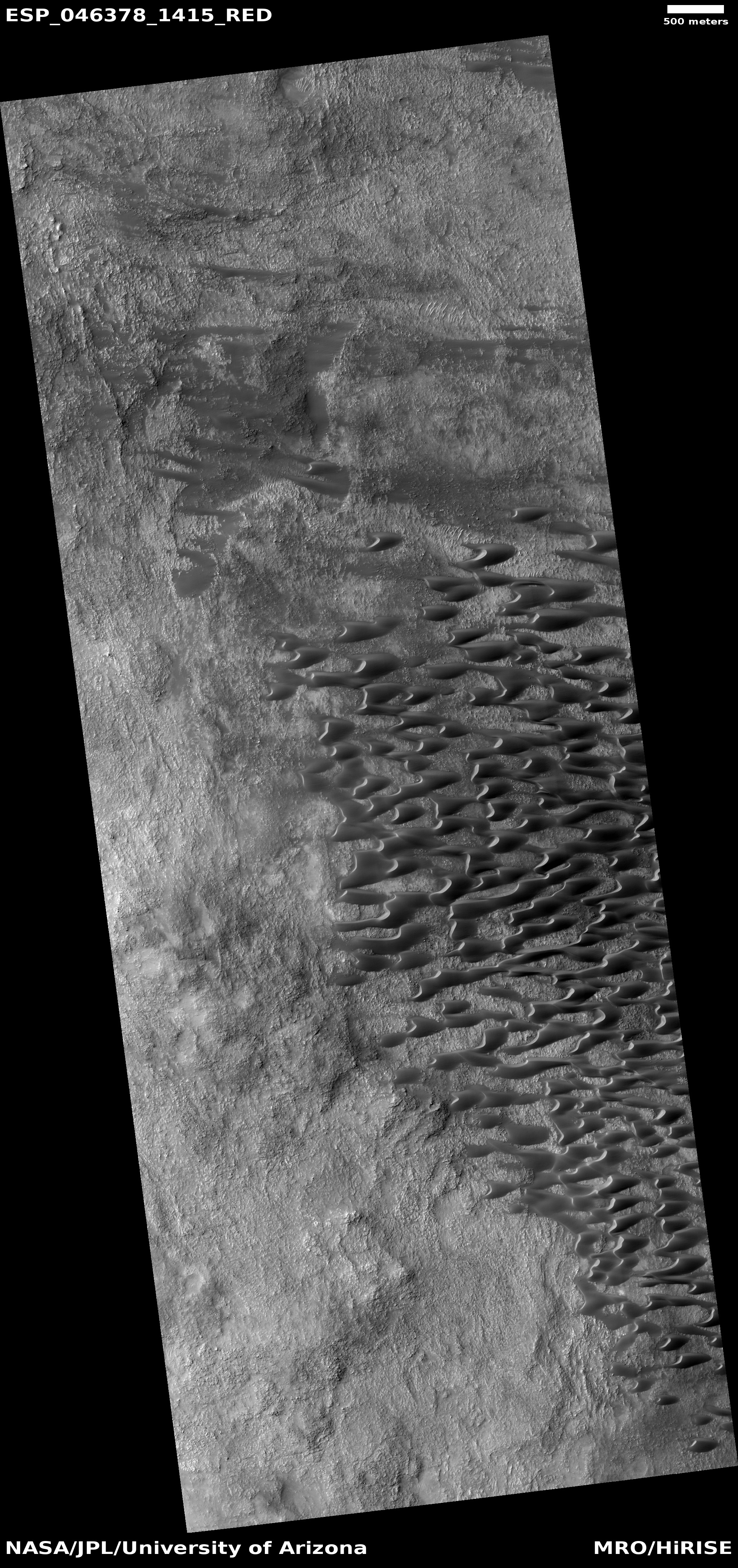
Wide view of a field of sand dunes, as seen by HiRISE under HiWish program

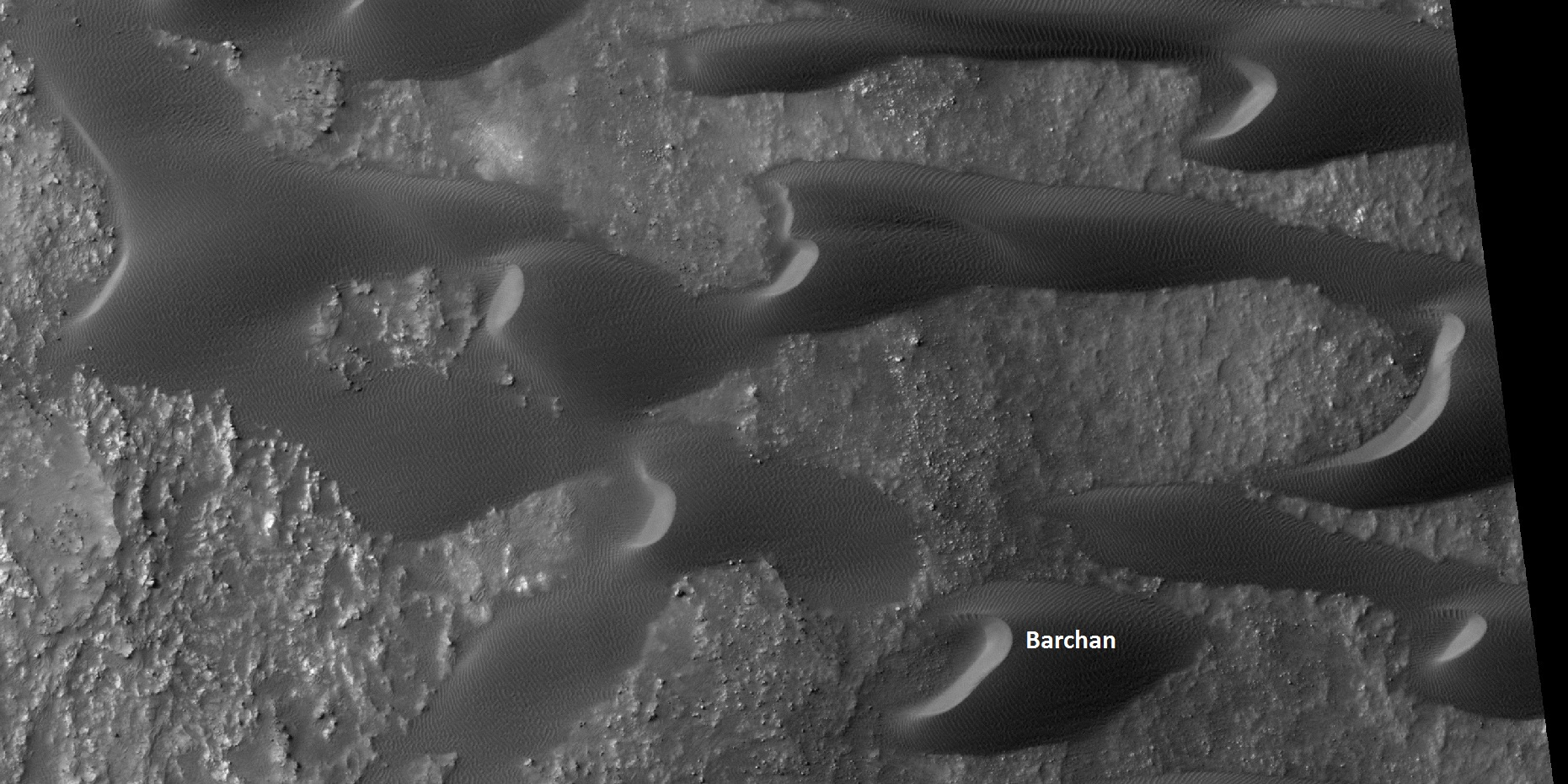
Close view of sand dunes, as seen by HiRISE under HiWish program A birchen dune is labeled.

== Gullies ==
Martian gullies are small, incised networks of narrow channels and their associated downslope sediment deposits, found on the planet of Mars. They are named for their resemblance to terrestrial gullies. First discovered on images from Mars Global Surveyor, they occur on steep slopes, especially on the walls of craters. Usually, each gully has a dendritic alcove at its head, a fan-shaped apron at its base, and a single thread of incised channel linking the two, giving the whole gully an hourglass shape. They are believed to be relatively young because they have few, if any craters.

On the basis of their form, aspects, positions, and location amongst and apparent interaction with features thought to be rich in water ice, many researchers believed that the processes carving the gullies involve liquid water. However, this remains a topic of active research.

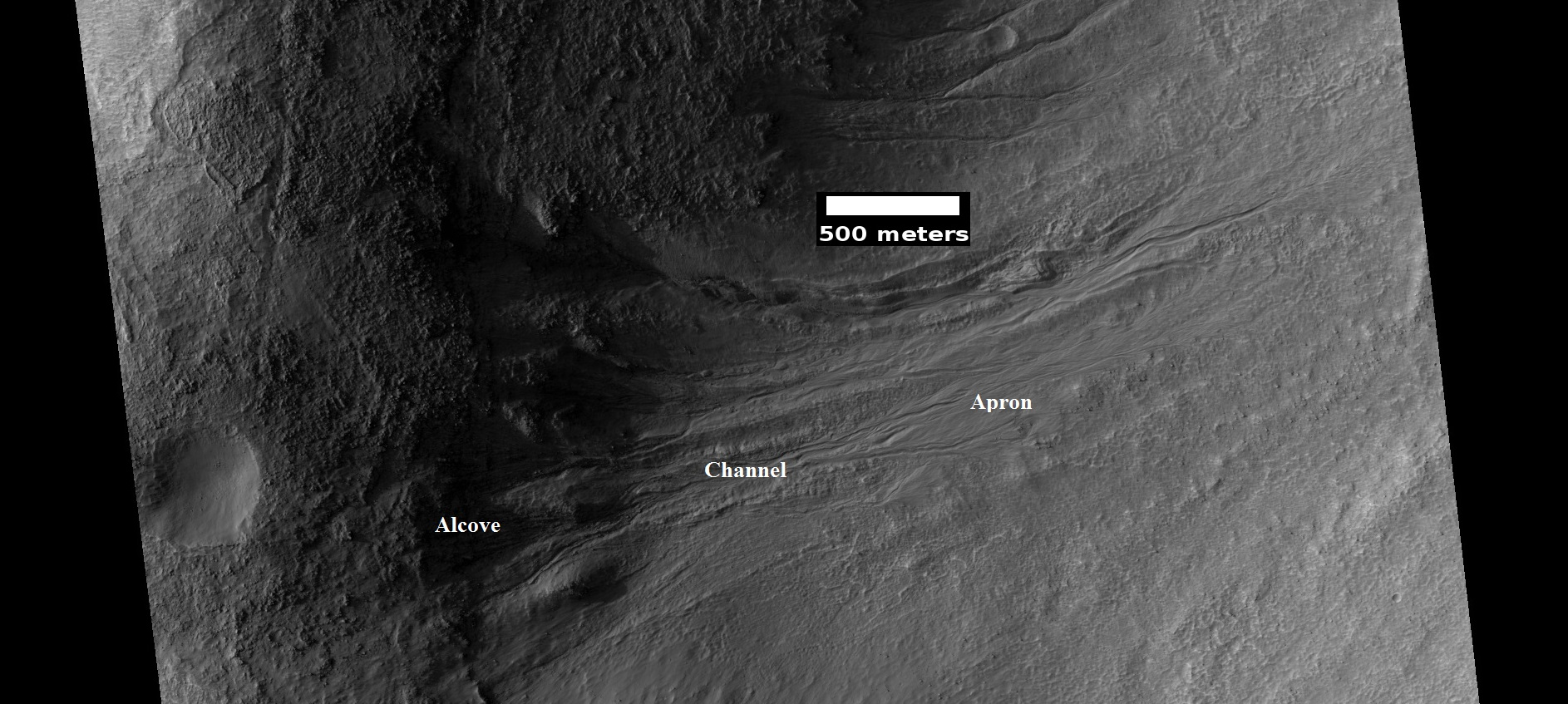
Gullies with alcove, channel, apron—the parts of a complete gully. Picture taken with HiRISE under HiWish program.

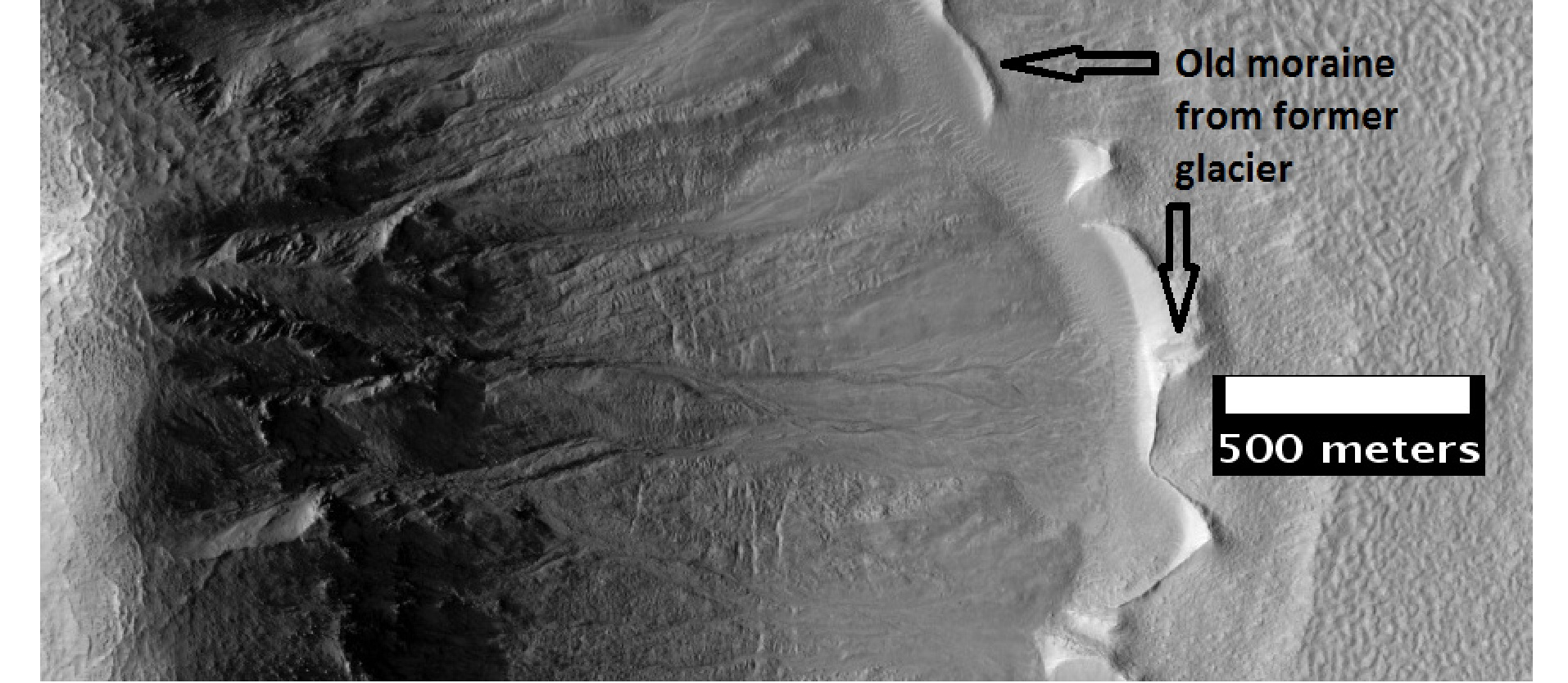
Gullies with remains of a former glacier in crater in Terra Sirenum, as seen by HiRISE under HiWish program. Location is the Phaethontis quadrangle.

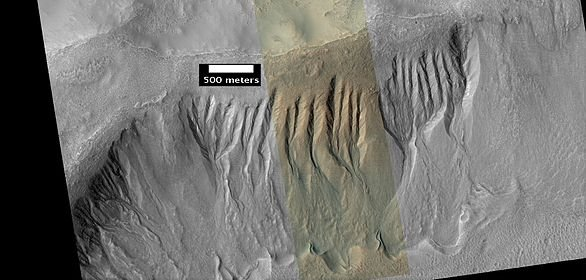
Gullies near Newton Crater, as seen by HiRISE under the HiWish Program. Location is the Phaethontis quadrangle.

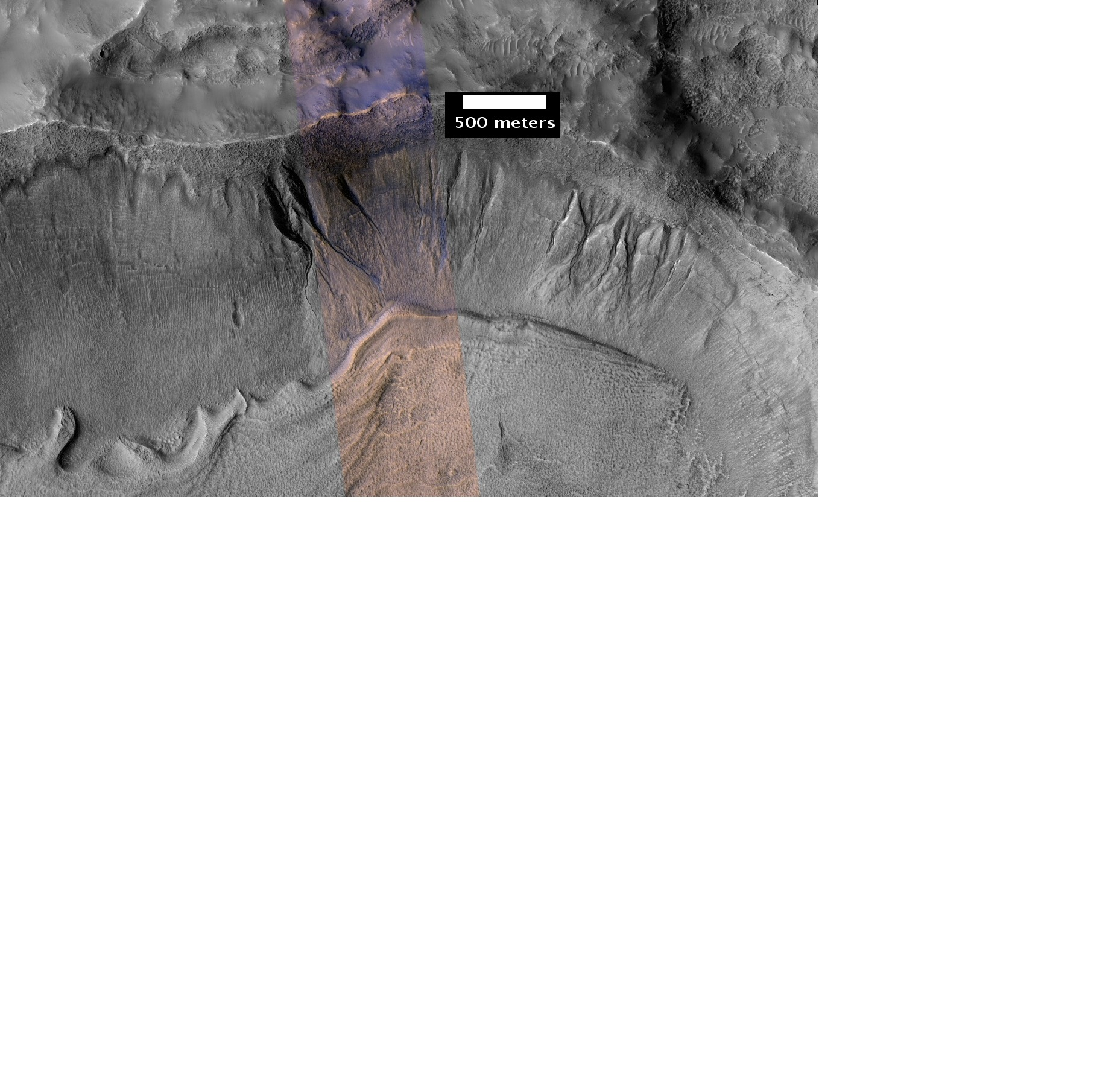
Gullies in a crater in Terra Sirenum, as seen by HiRISE under the HiWish Program. Location is the Phaethontis quadrangle.

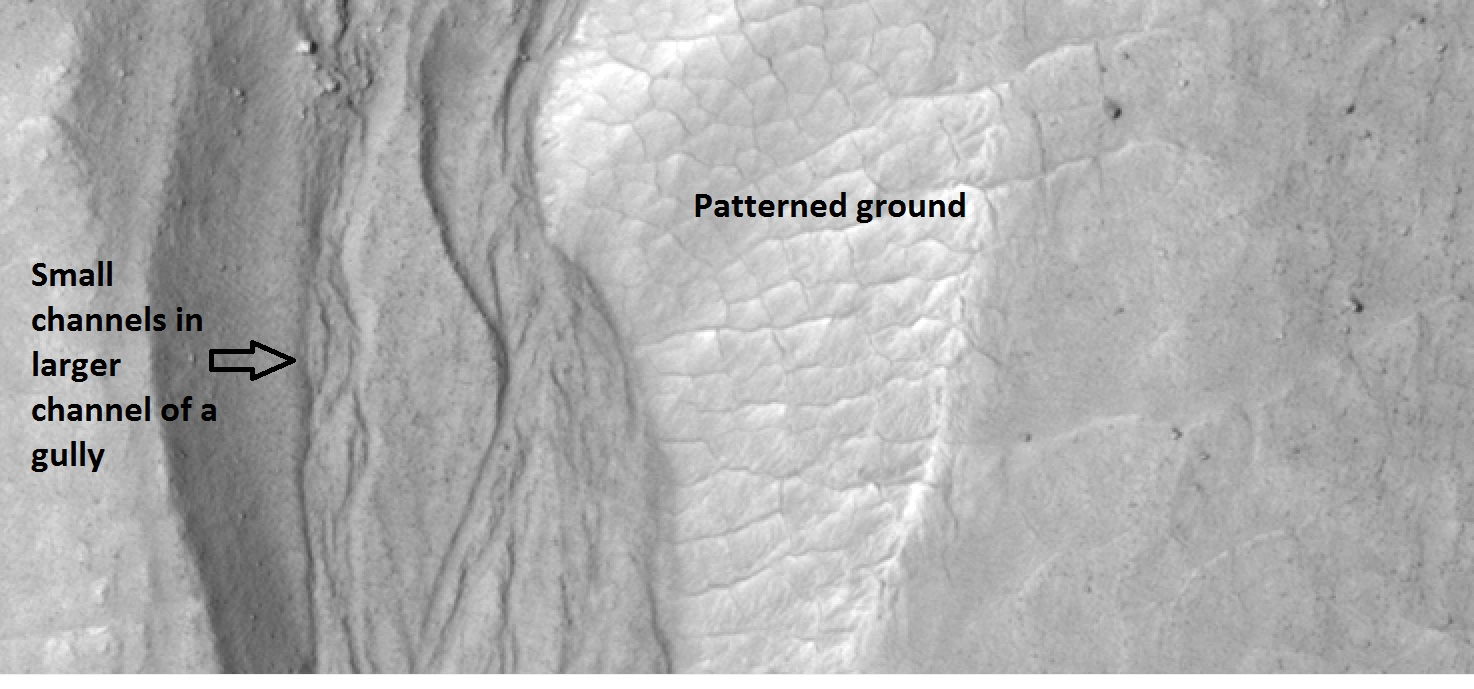
Close-up of gully showing multiple channels and patterned ground, as seen by HiRISE under the HiWish program. Location is the Phaethontis quadrangle.

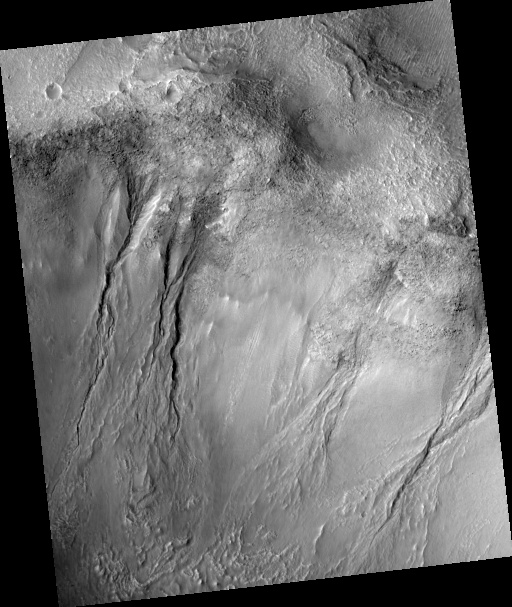
Group of gullies in Thaumasia quadrangle, as seen by HiRISE under the HiWish program.

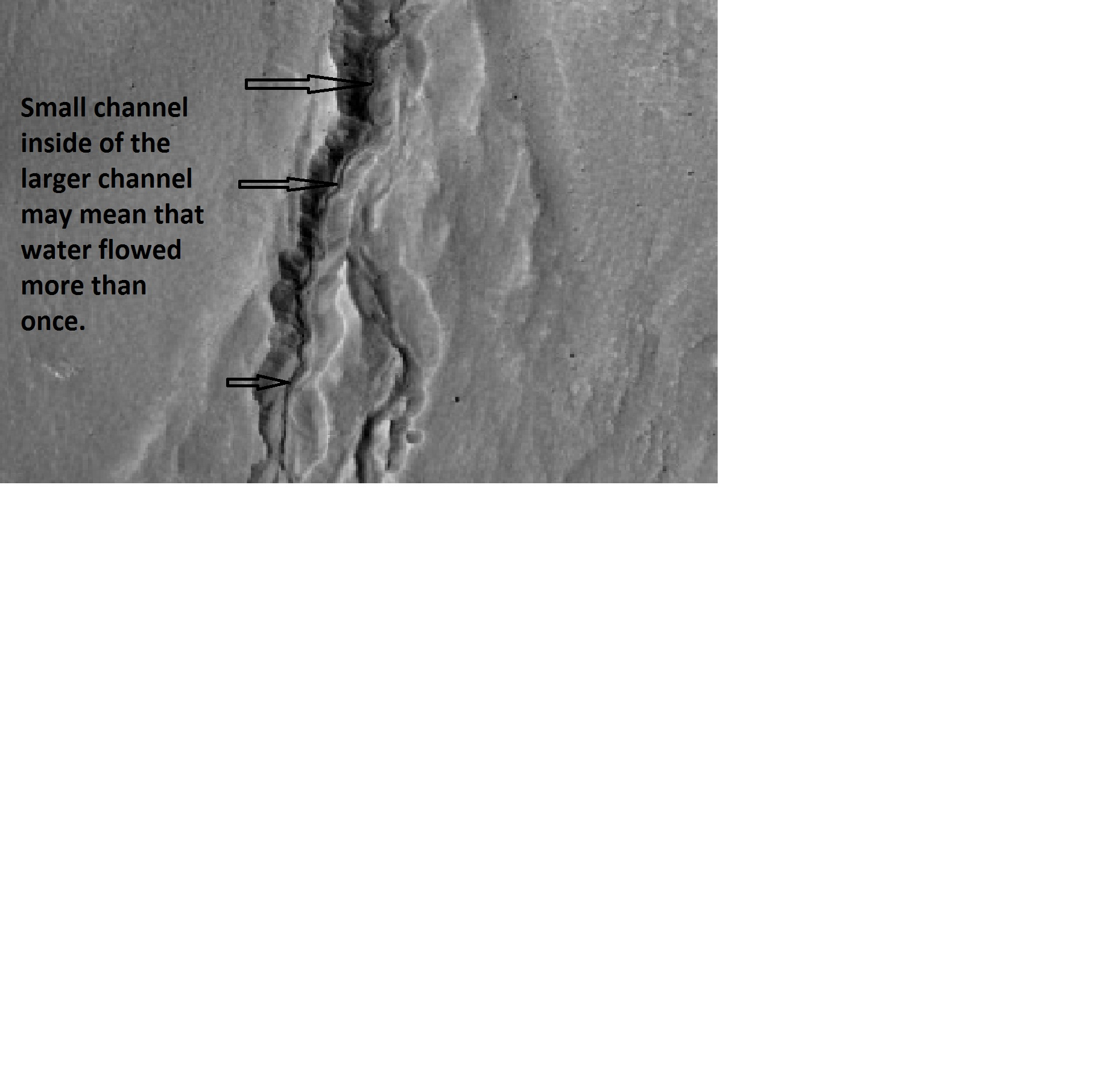
Enlargement of part of previous image showing smaller gullies inside larger ones. Water probably flowed in these gullies more than once.

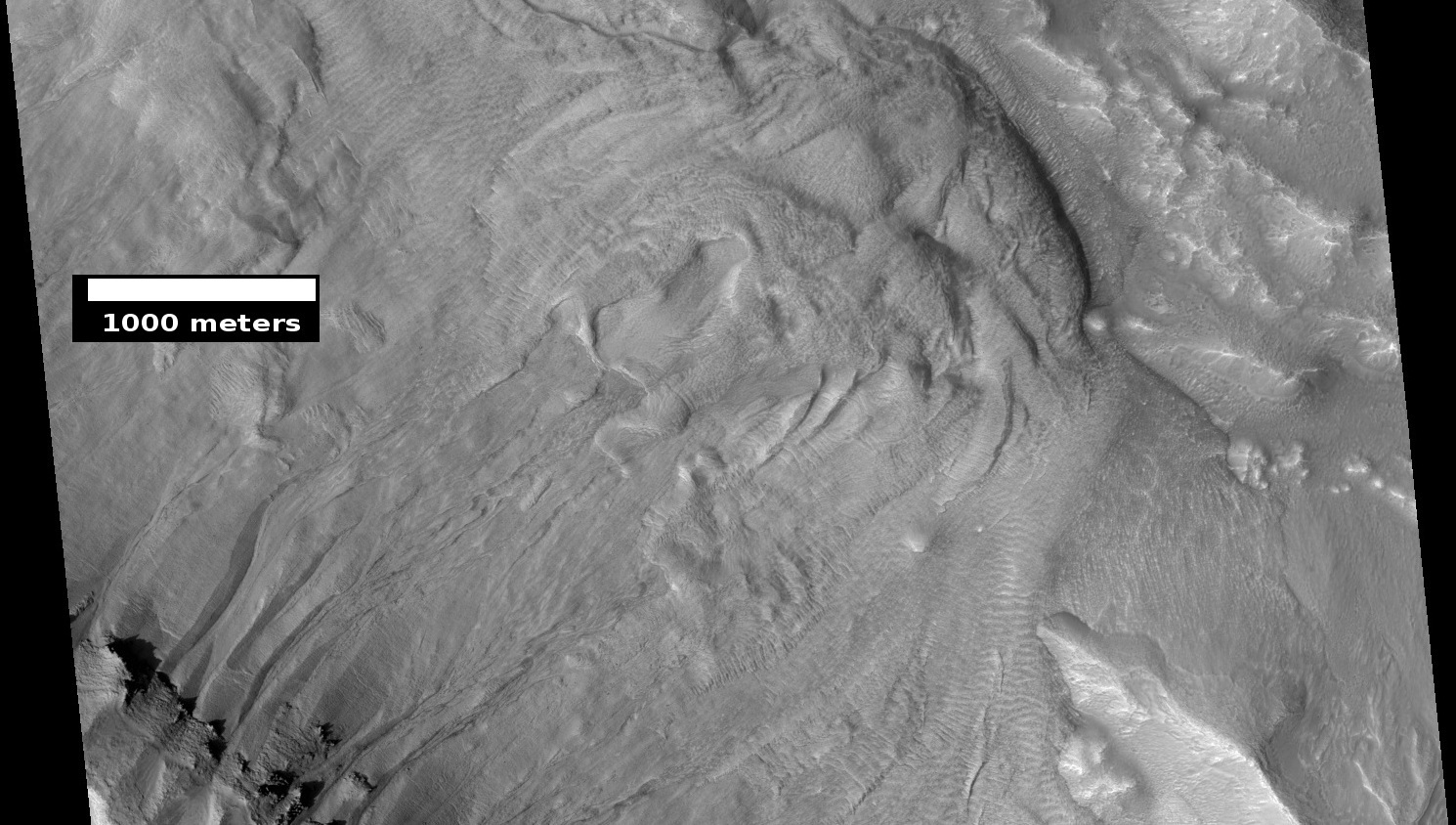
Gullies and massive flow of material, as seen by HiRISE under HiWish program. Gullies are enlarged in next image. Location is Bamberg crater

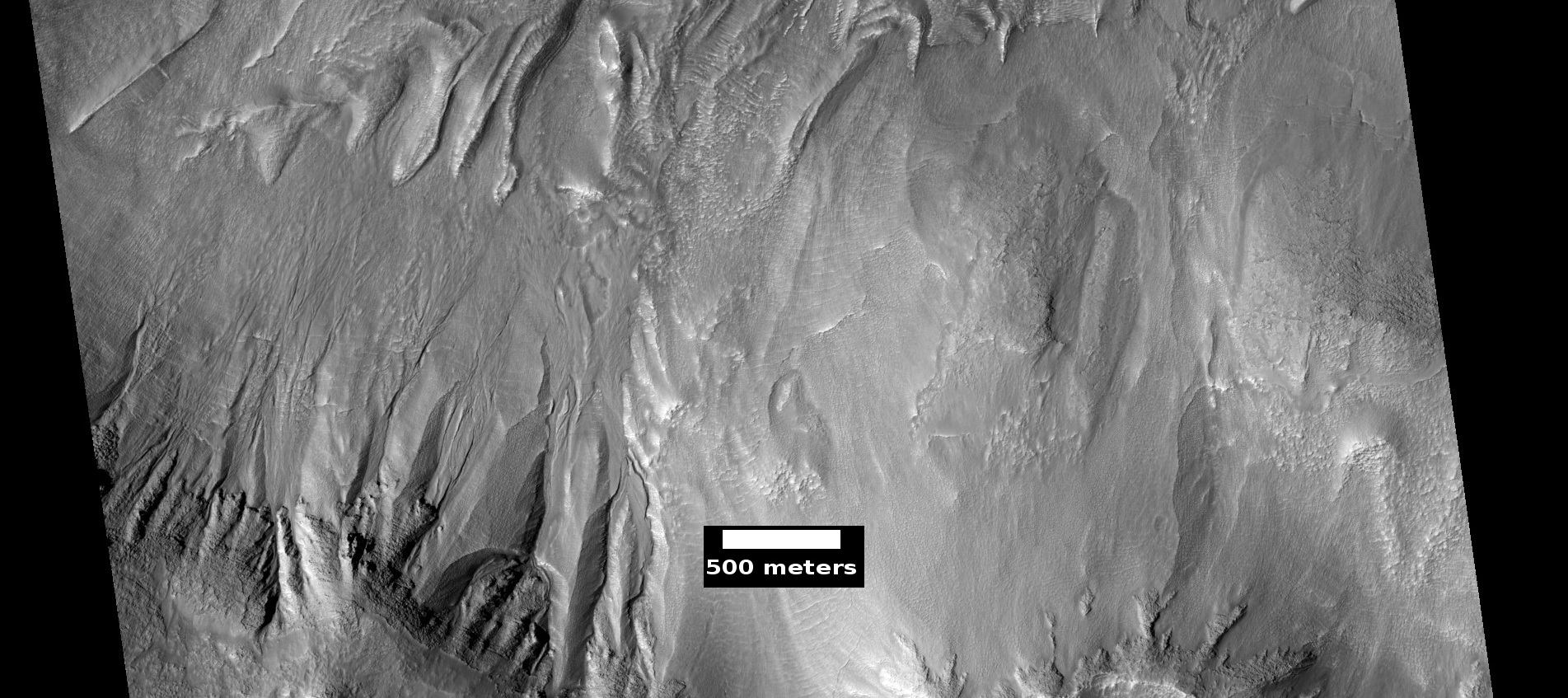
Gullies in a crater, as seen by HiRISE under HiWish program. Location is in the Mare Acidalium quadrangle.

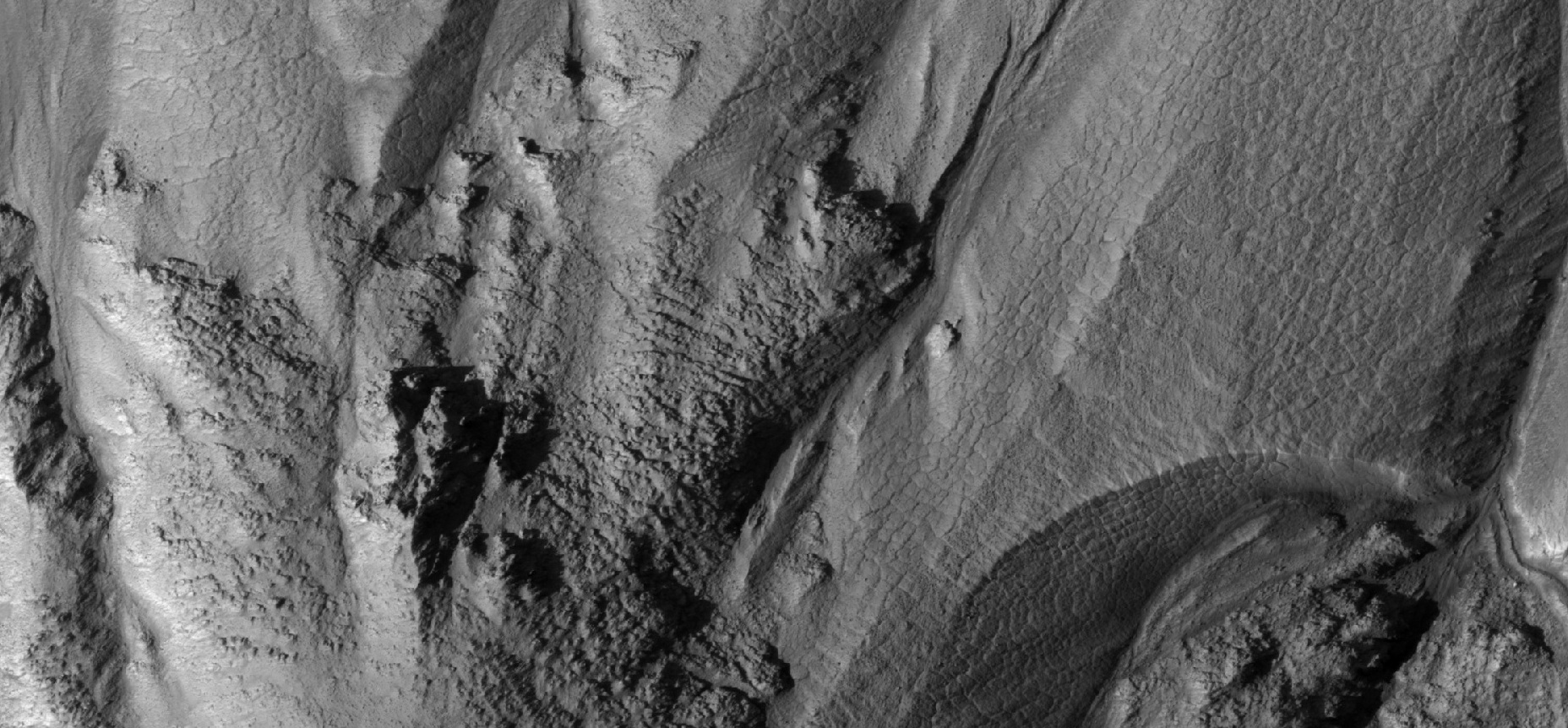
Close-up of gullies in a crater from previous image. Image taken by HiRISE under HiWish program.

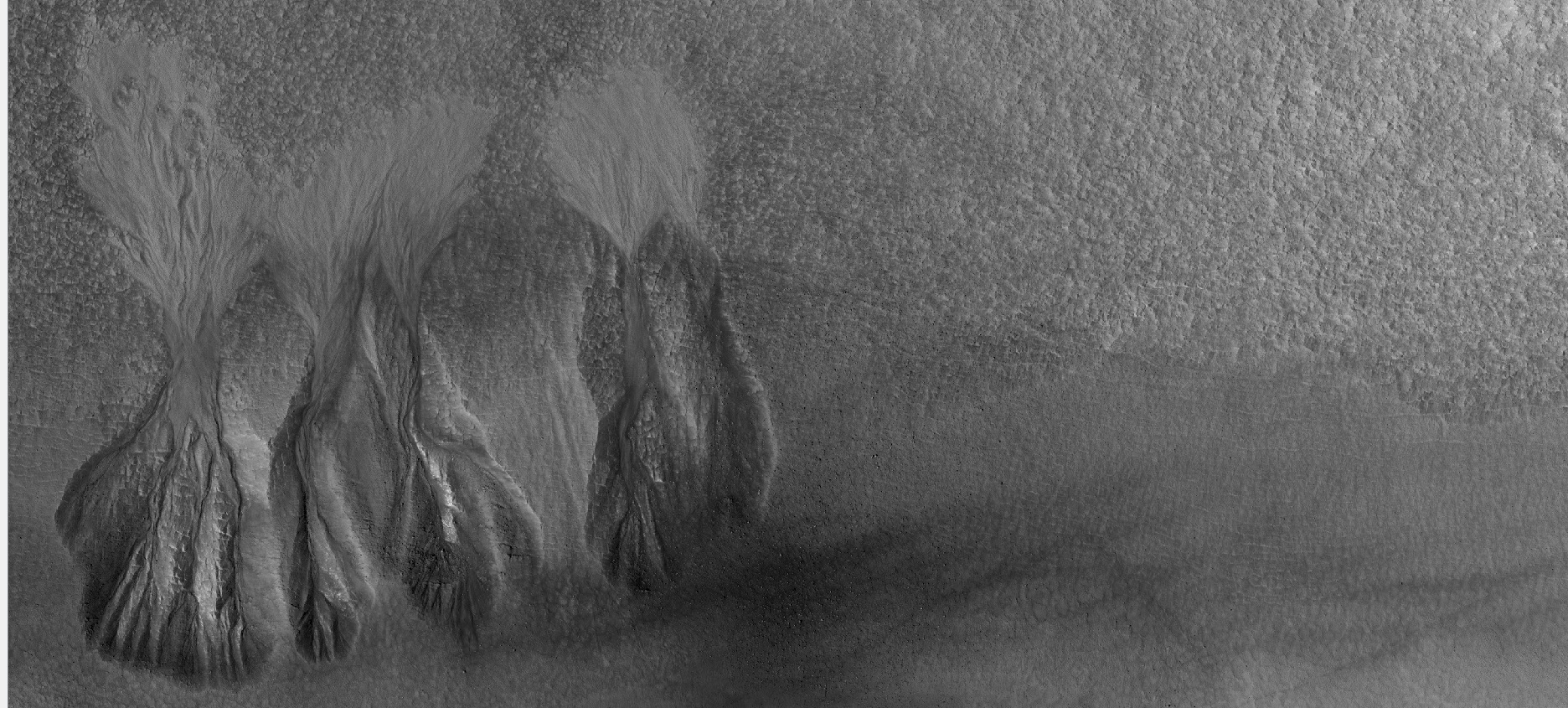
Wide view of group of gullies, as seen by HiRISE under HiWish program. Note that part of this image is enlarged in the following image. Location is Diacria quadrangle.

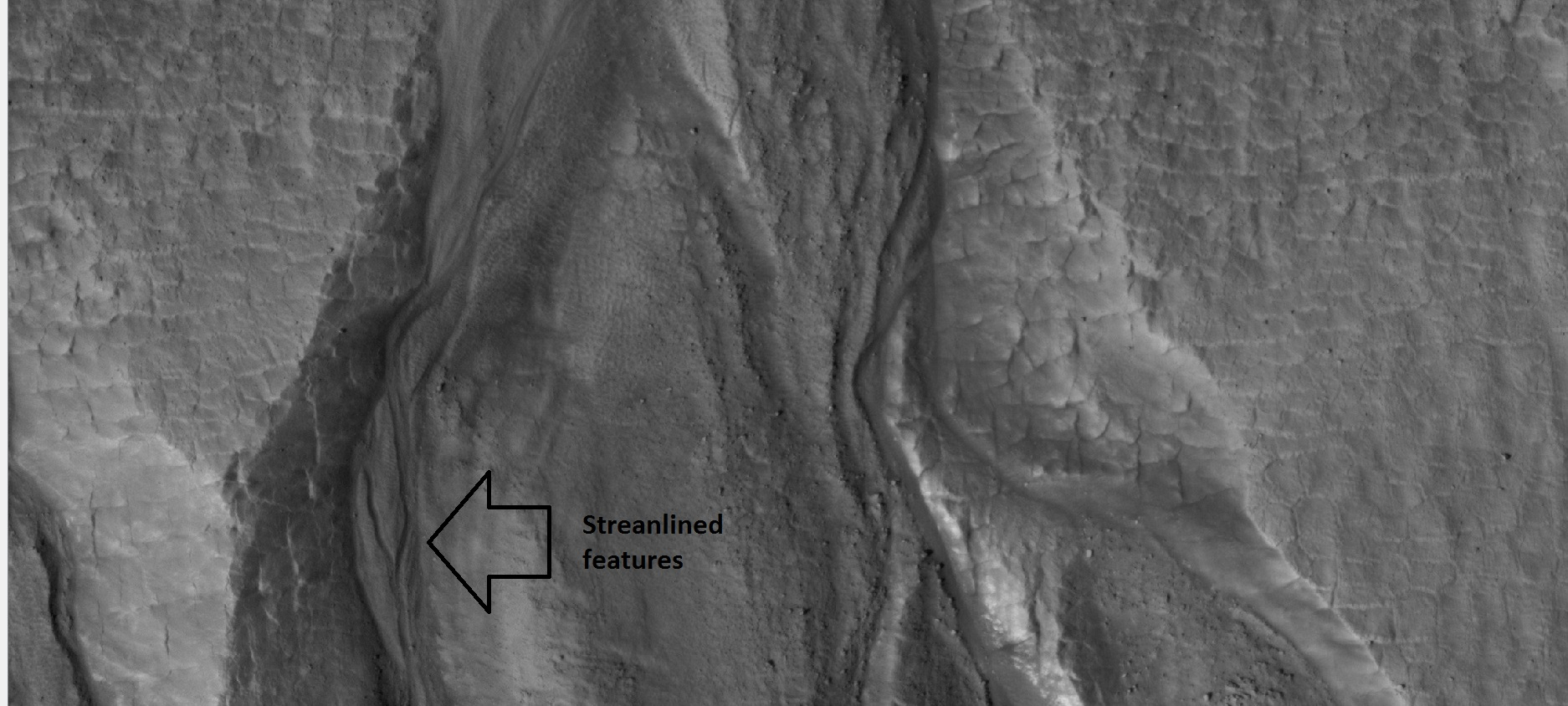
Close-up of gullies, as seen by HiRISE under HiWish program. Streamlined features in the channels are suggestive of a formation by running water. Location is Diacria quadrangle.
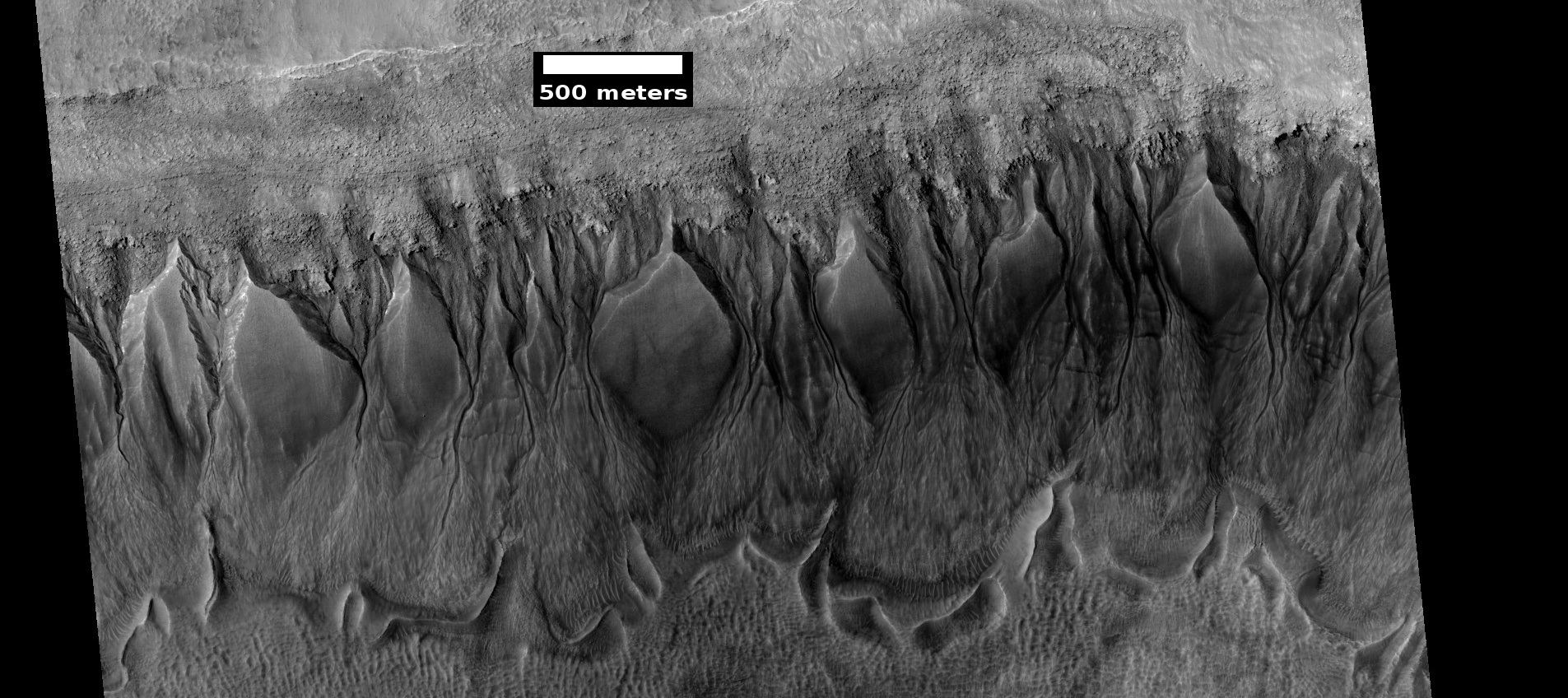
Gullies in crater in Phaethontis quadrangle, as seen by HiRISE under HiWish program

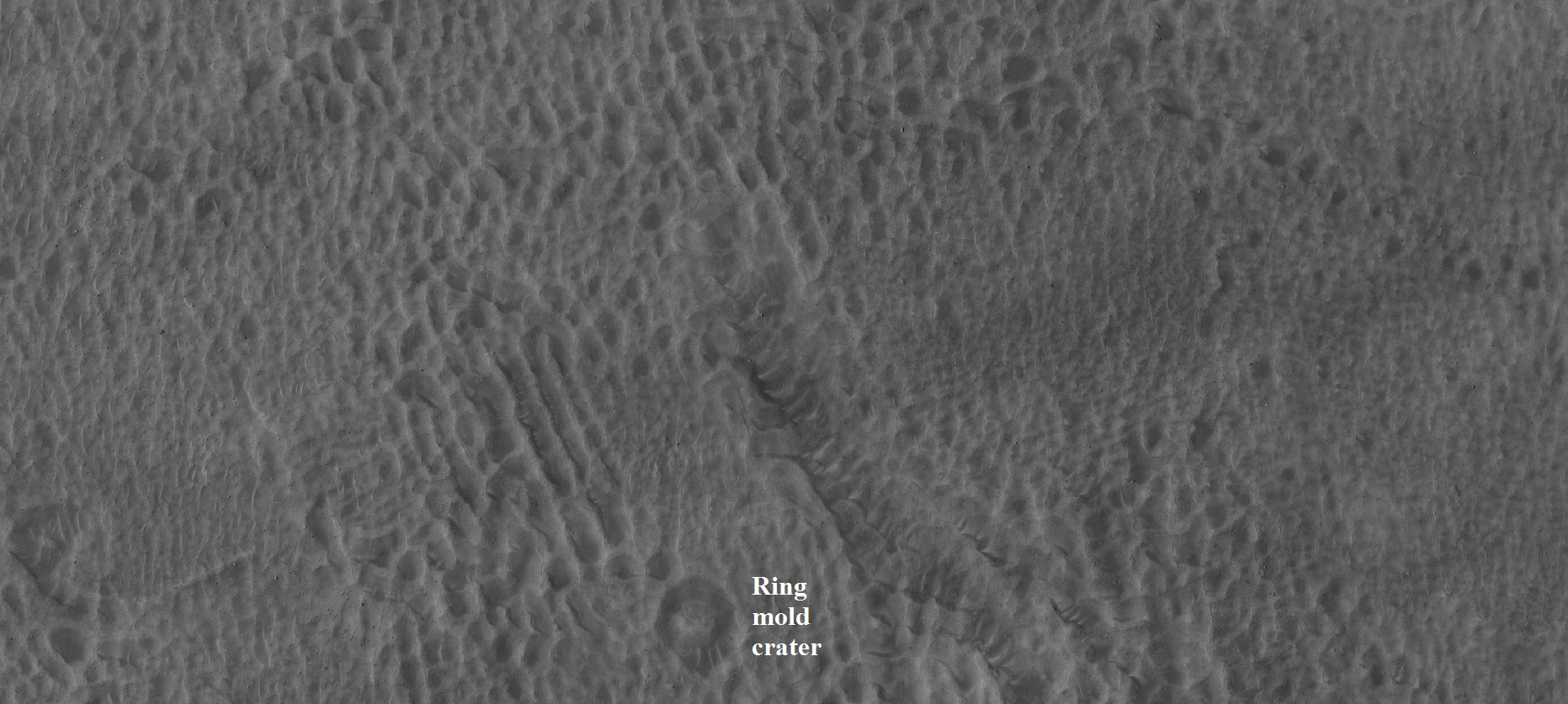
Floor of crater from previous image in Phaethontis quadrangle, as seen by HiRISE under HiWish program Ring mold crater is caused by asteroid reaching an ice layer. Pits on floor may be from ice escaping the ground.

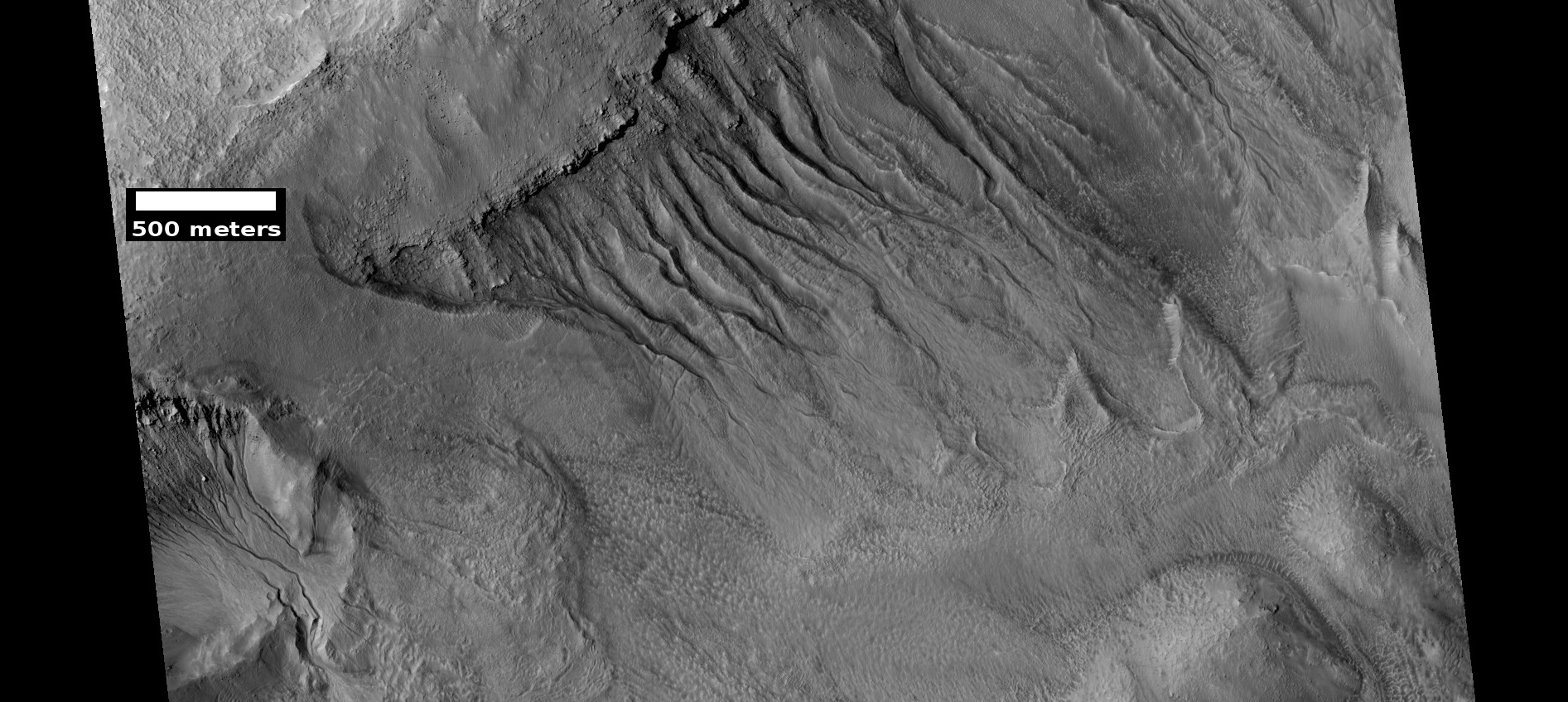
Gullies in crater, as seen by HiRISE under HiWish program. Location is Eridania quadrangle.

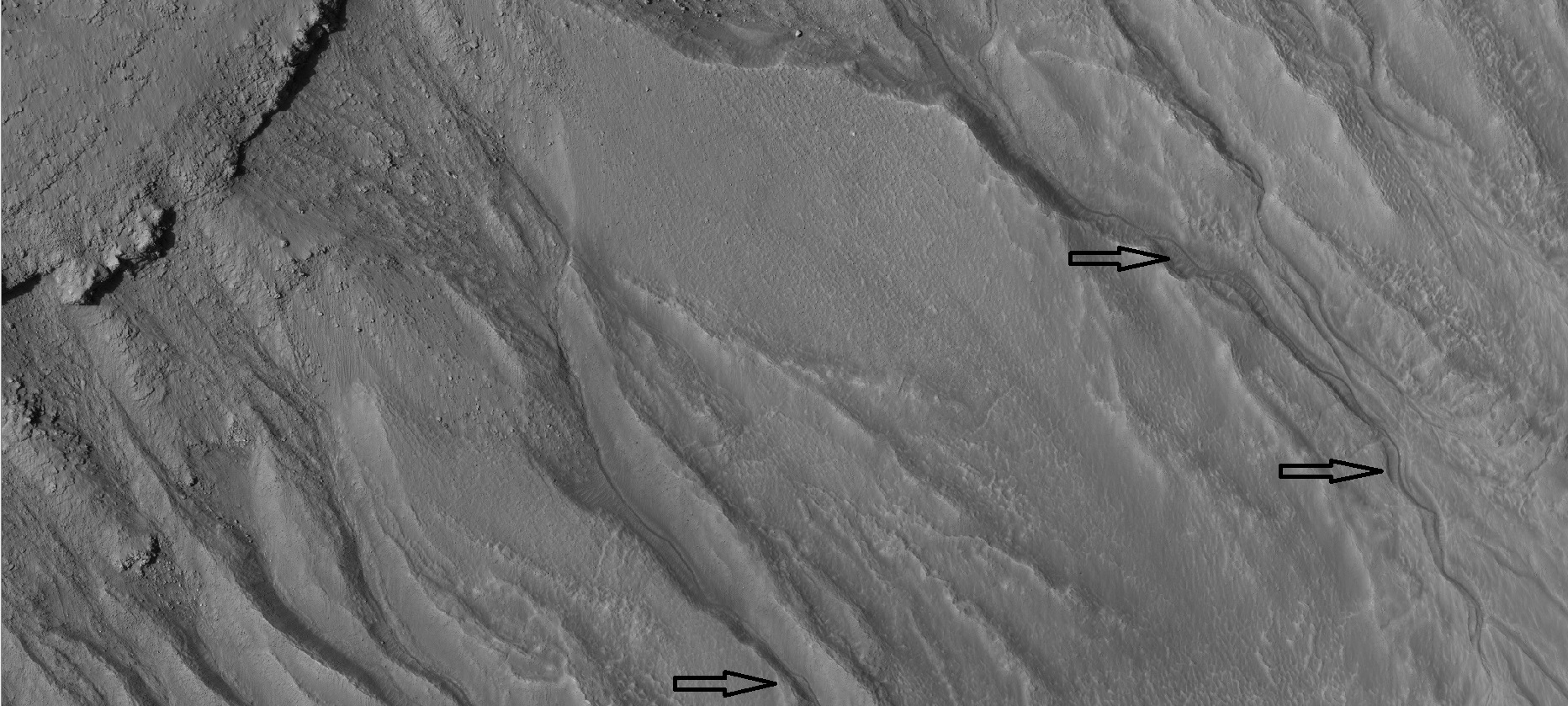
Close-up of gullies in crater showing channels within larger valleys and curves in channels. These characteristics suggest they were made by flowing water. Note: this is an enlargement of the previous image by HiRISE under HiWish program. Location is Eridania quadrangle.

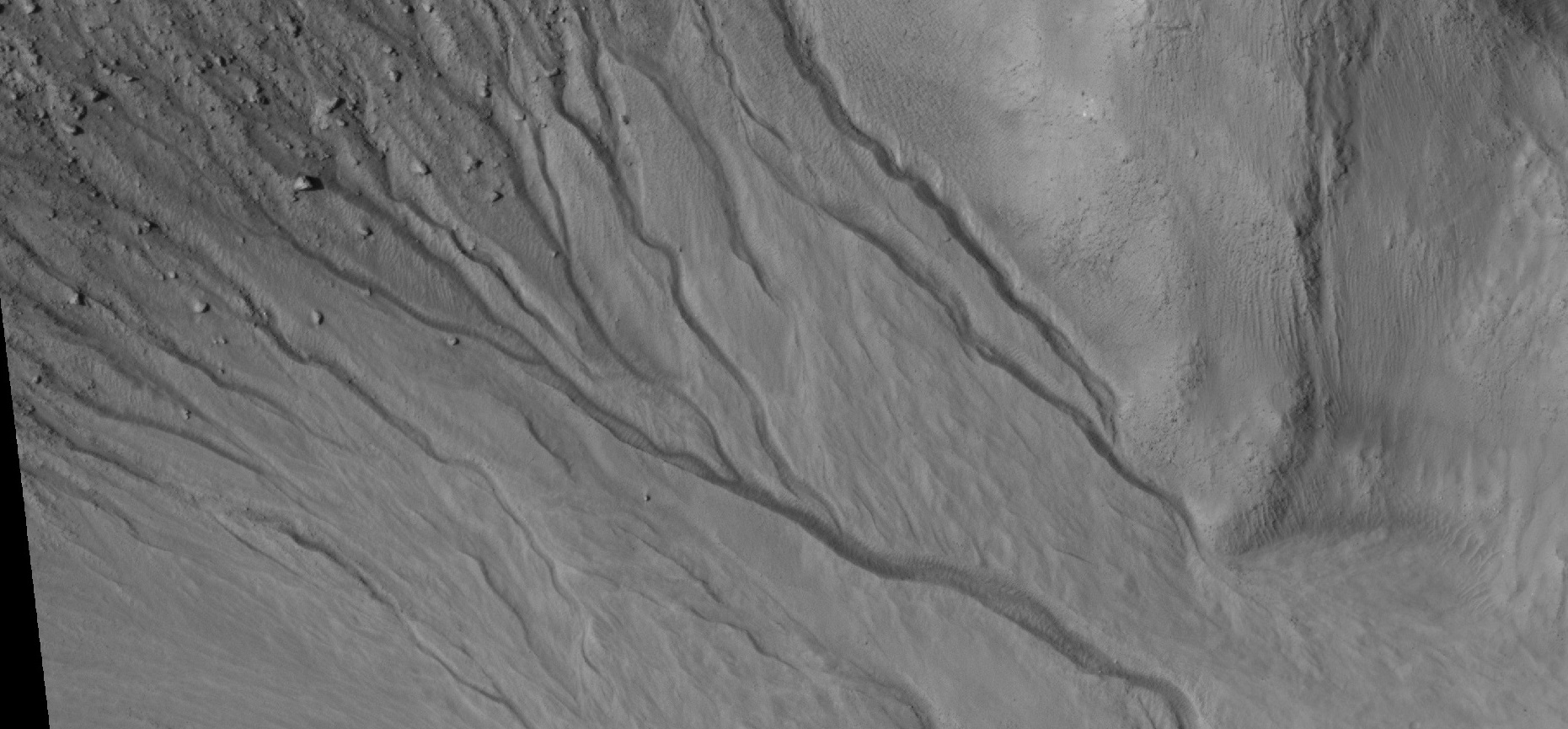
Close-up of gully network showing branched channels and curves; these characteristics suggest creation by a fluid. Note: this is an enlargement of a previous wide view of gullies in a crater, as seen by HiRISE under HiWish program. Location is Eridania quadrangle.

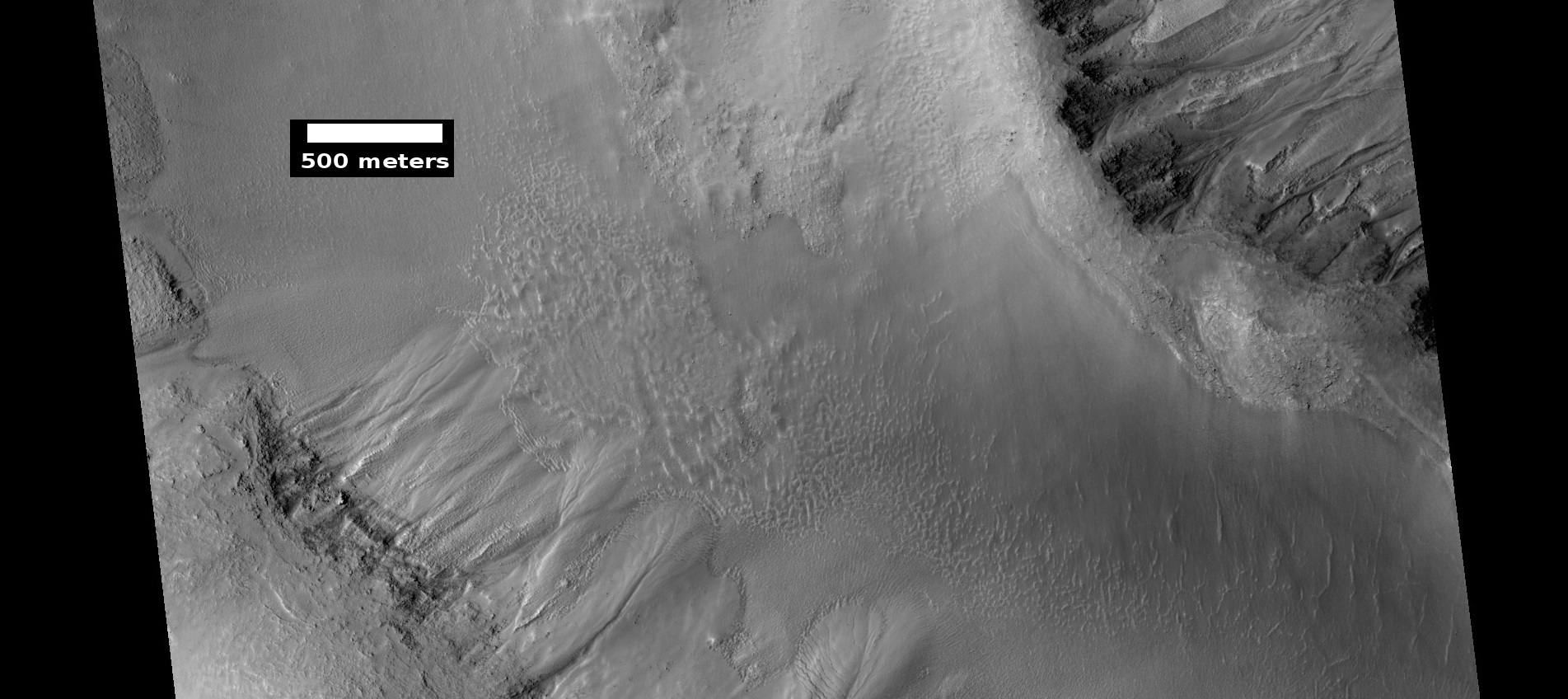
Gullies in two levels of a crater wall, as seen by HiRISE under HiWish program. Gullies at two levels suggests they were not made with an aquifer, as was first suggested. Location is Phaethontis quadrangle.

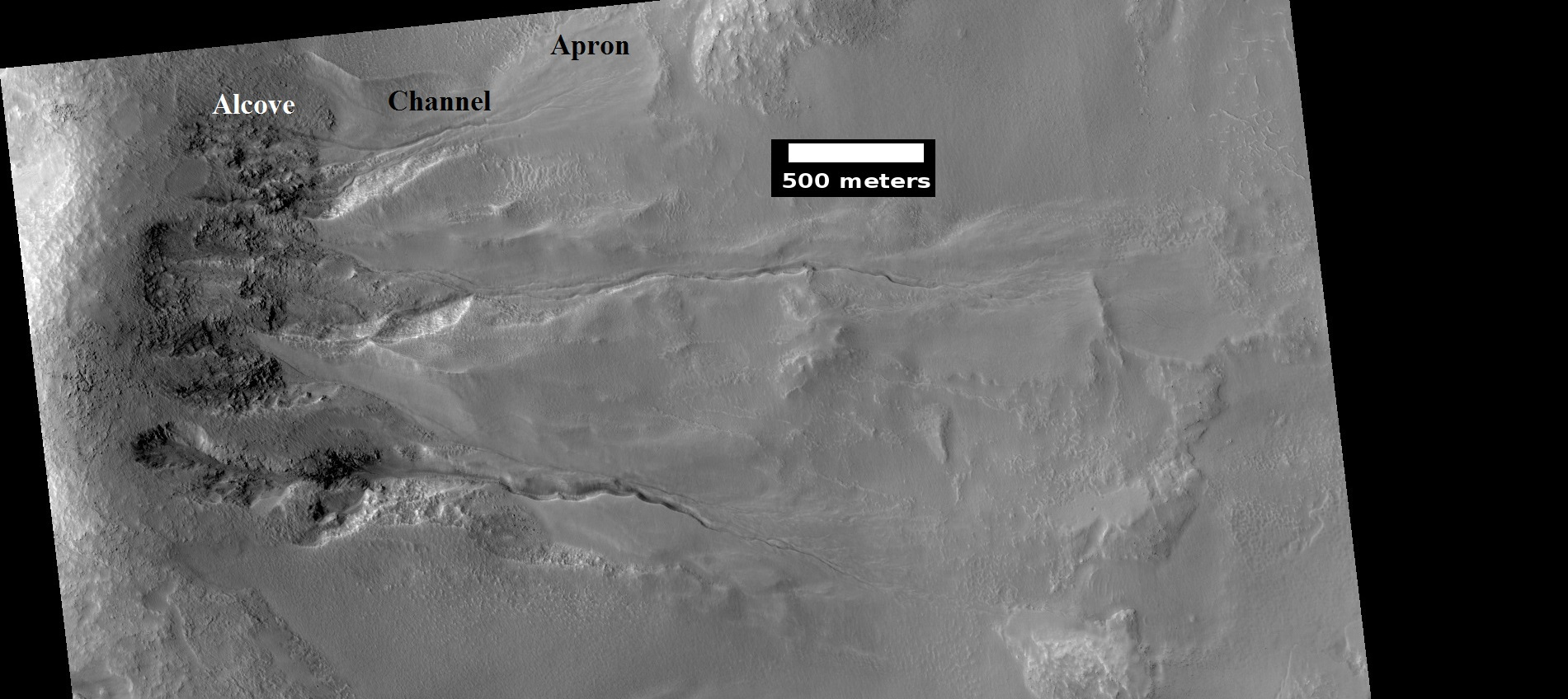
Image of gullies with main parts labeled. The main parts of a Martian gully are alcove, channel, and apron. Since there are no craters on this gully, it is thought to be rather young. Picture was taken by HiRISE under HiWish program. Location is Phaethontis quadrangle.

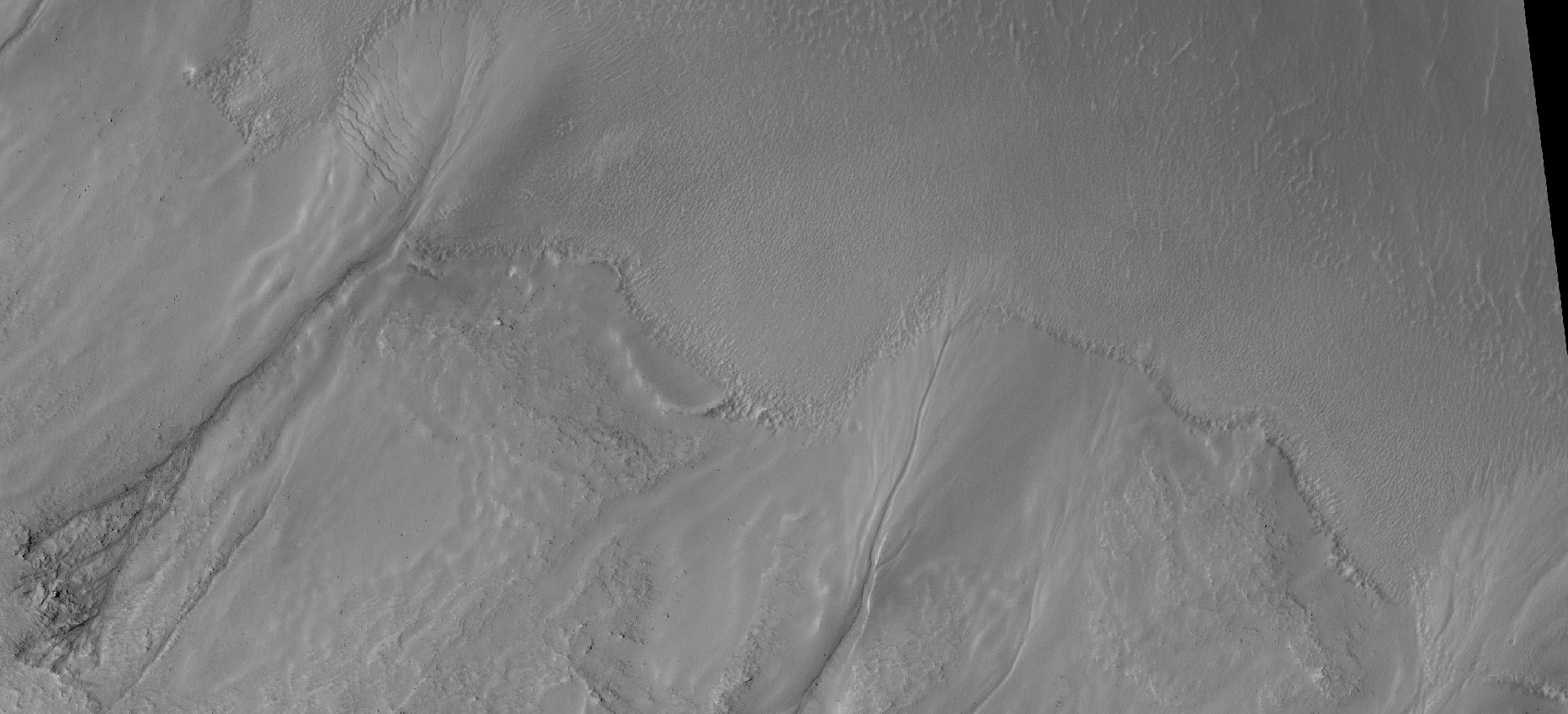
Close-up of gully aprons showing they are free of craters; hence very young. Location is Phaethontis quadrangle. Picture was taken by HiRISE under HiWish program.

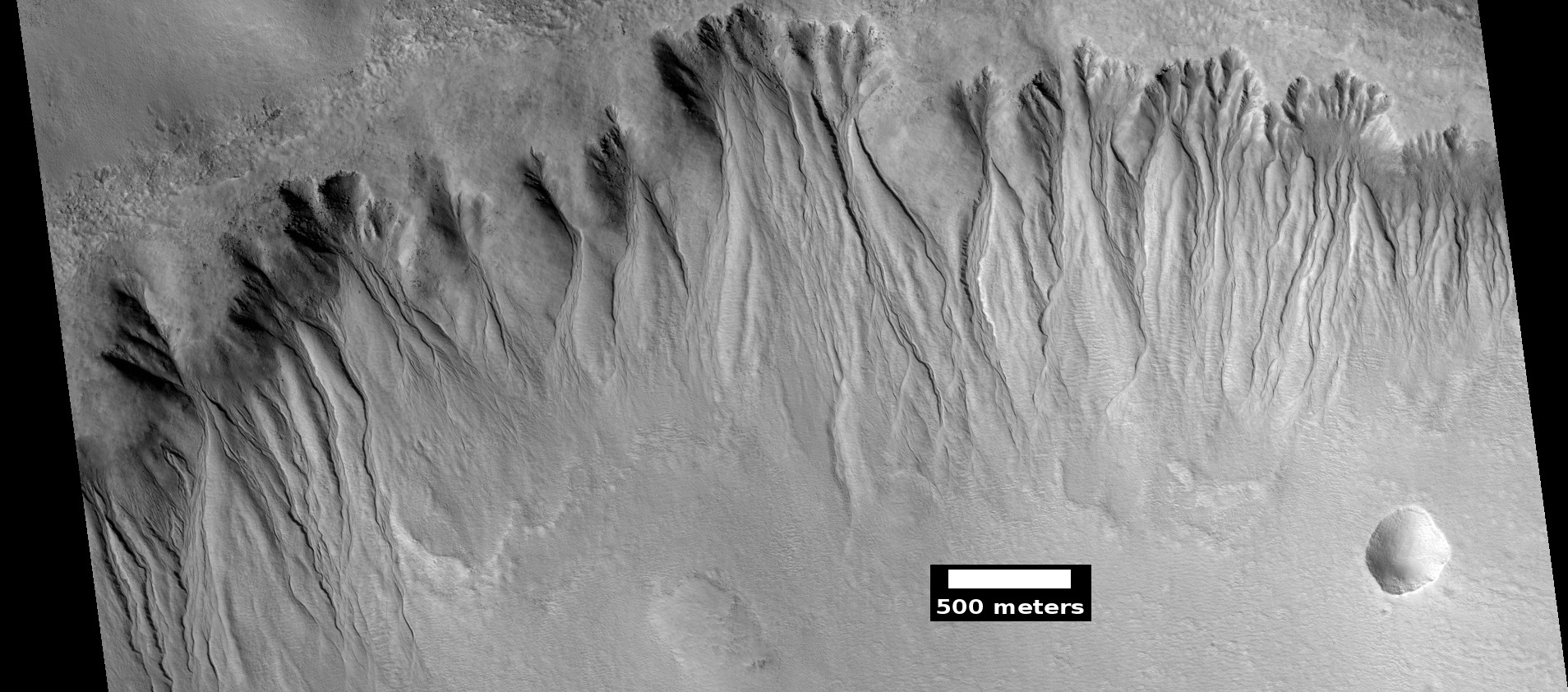
Gullies on wall of crater, as seen by HiRISE under HiWish program Location is the Mare Acidalium quadrangle.

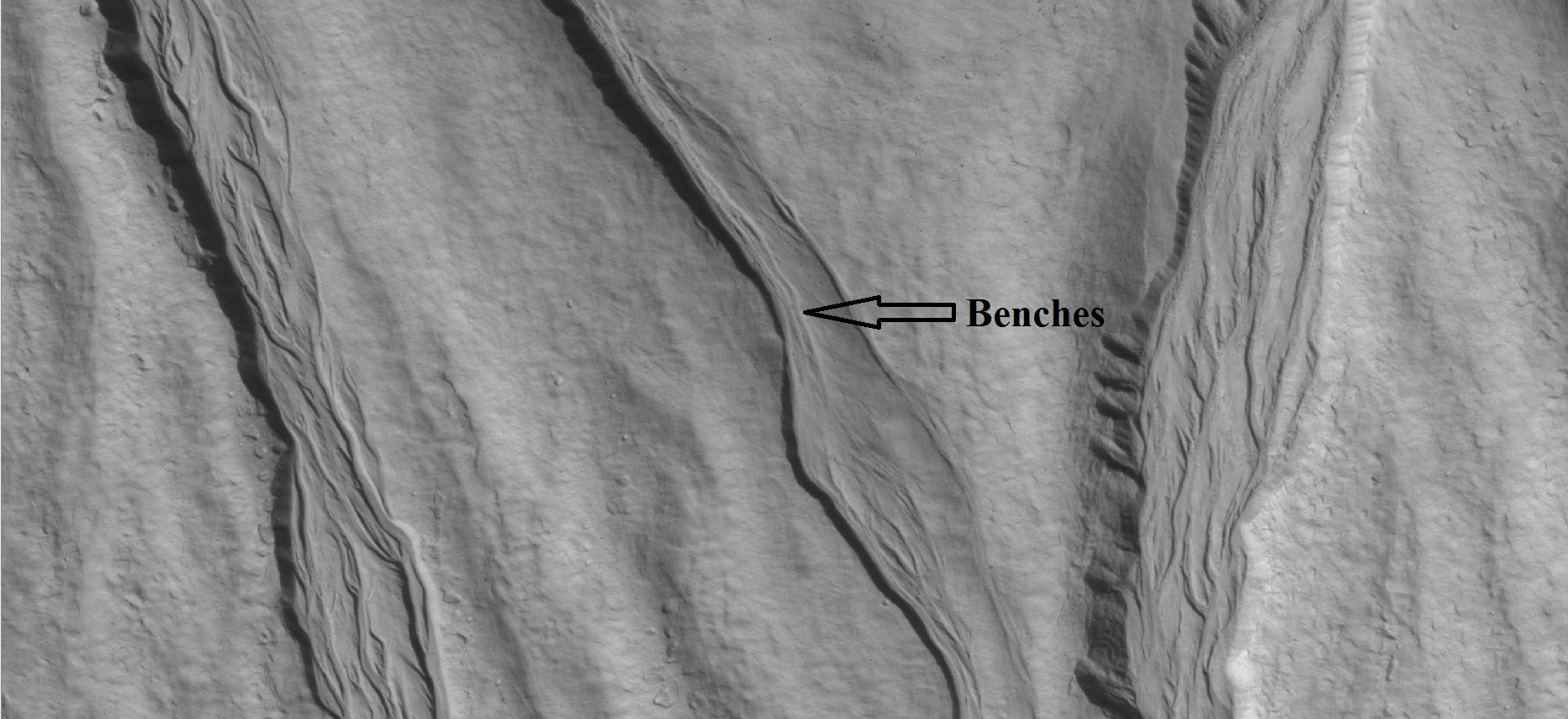
Close-up of gully channels, as seen by HiRISE under HiWish program. This image shows many streamlined forms and some benches along a channel. These features suggest formation by running water. Benches are usually formed when the water level goes down a bit and stays at that level for a time. Picture was taken with HiRISE under HiWish program. Location is the Mare Acidalium quadrangle. Note this is an enlargement of a previous image.
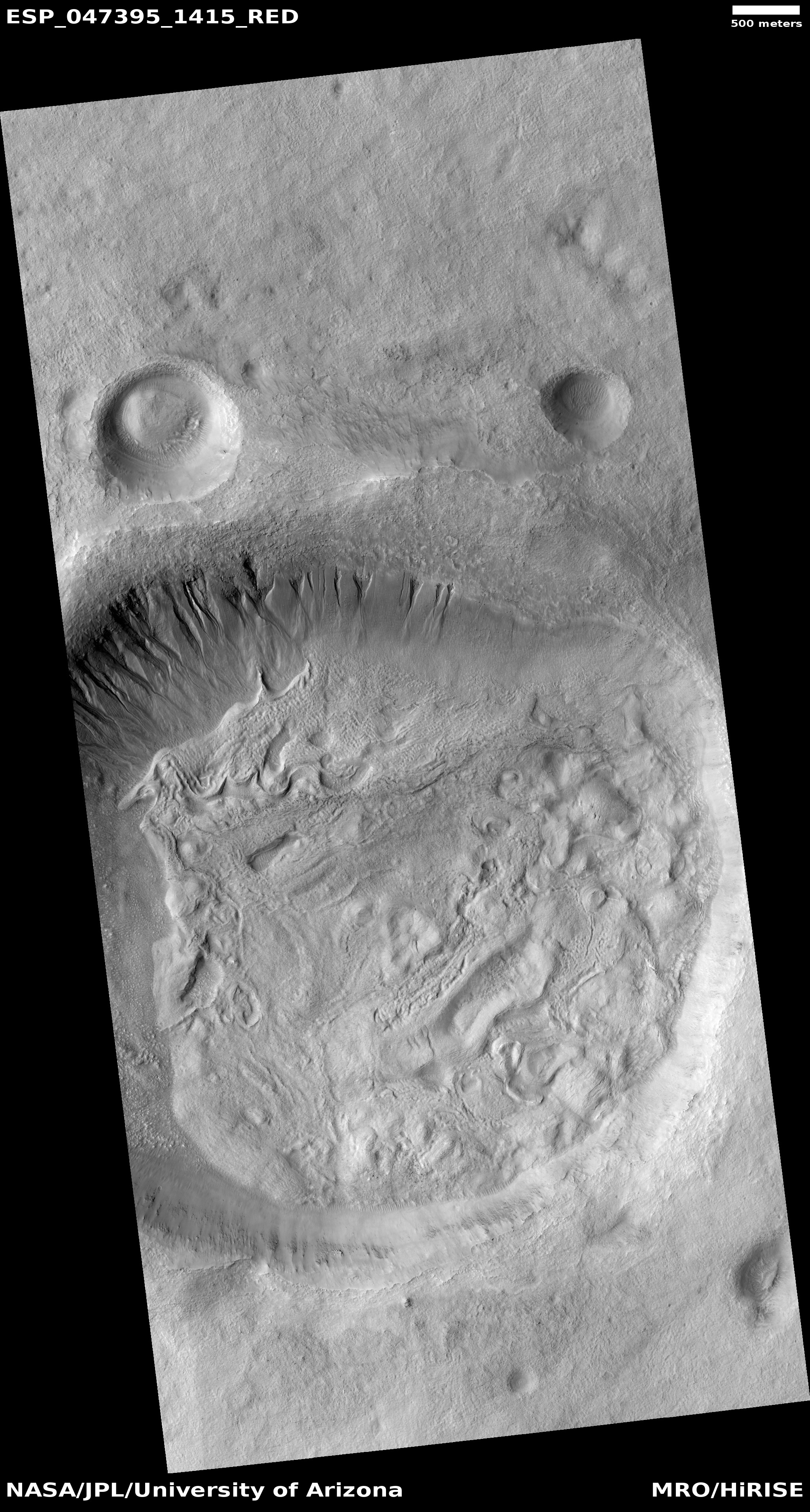
Gullies in crater, as seen by HiRISE under HiWish program

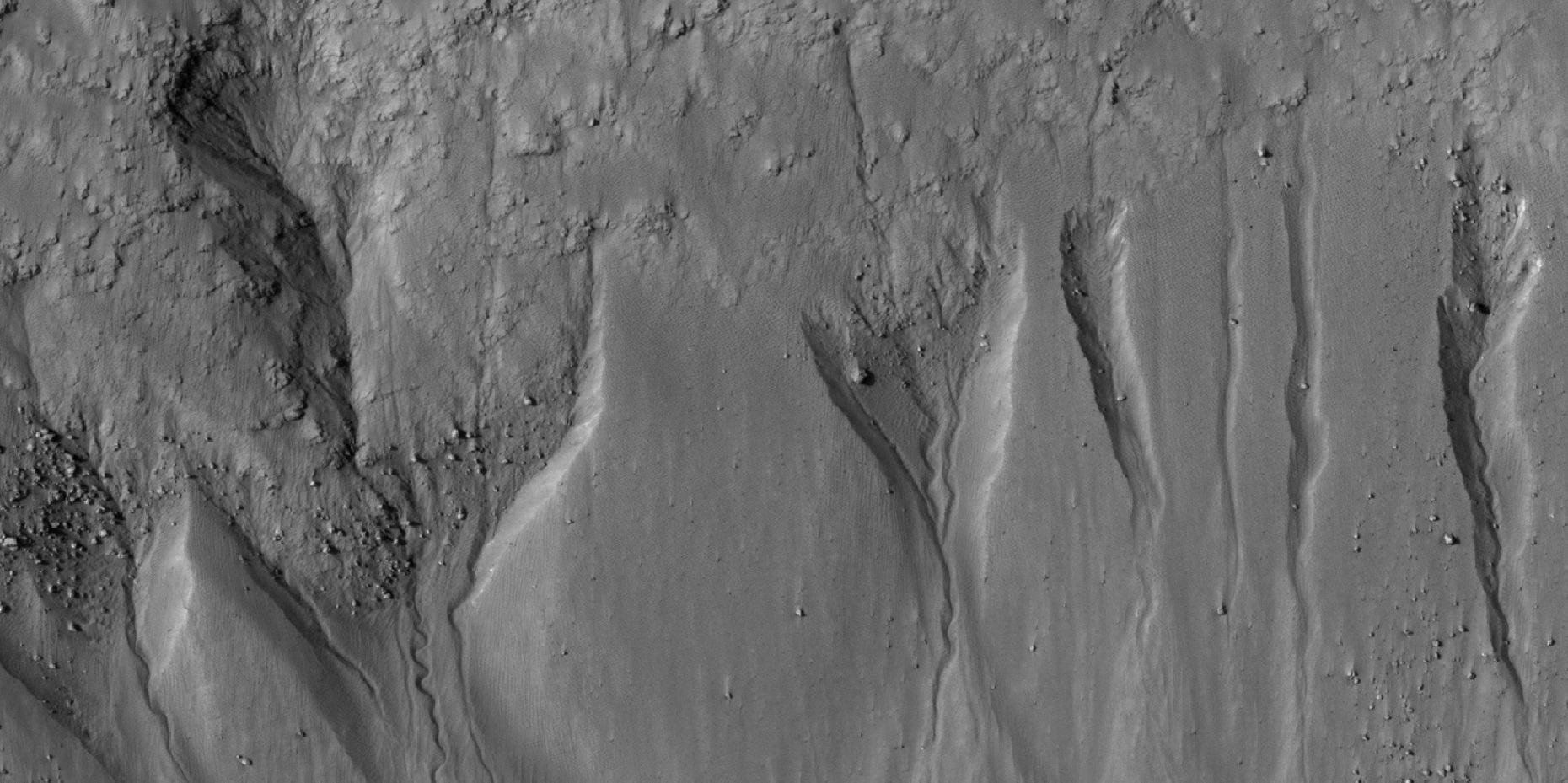
Close view of gullies from previous image The channels are quite curved. Because channels of gullies often form curves, it was thought that they were made by flowing water. Today, it is thought that they could be produced with chunks of dry ice. The image is from HiRISE under HiWish program.

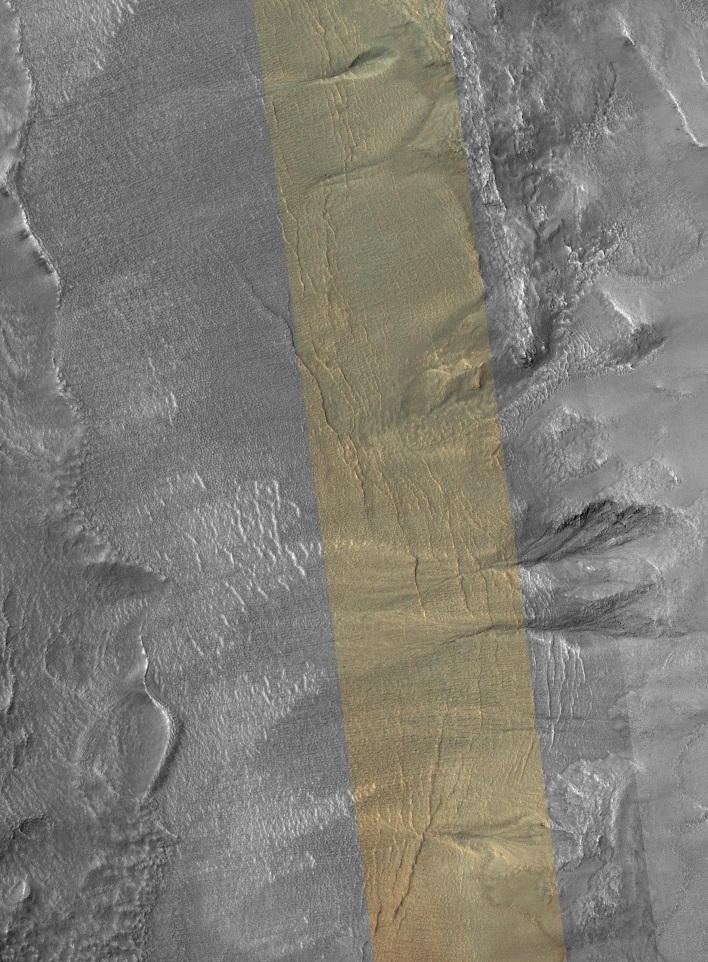
Gullies, as seen by HiRISE. The gullies range from very samll to large, as such they may represent different stages in the formation of gullies. The colored strip is about 1 km wide.

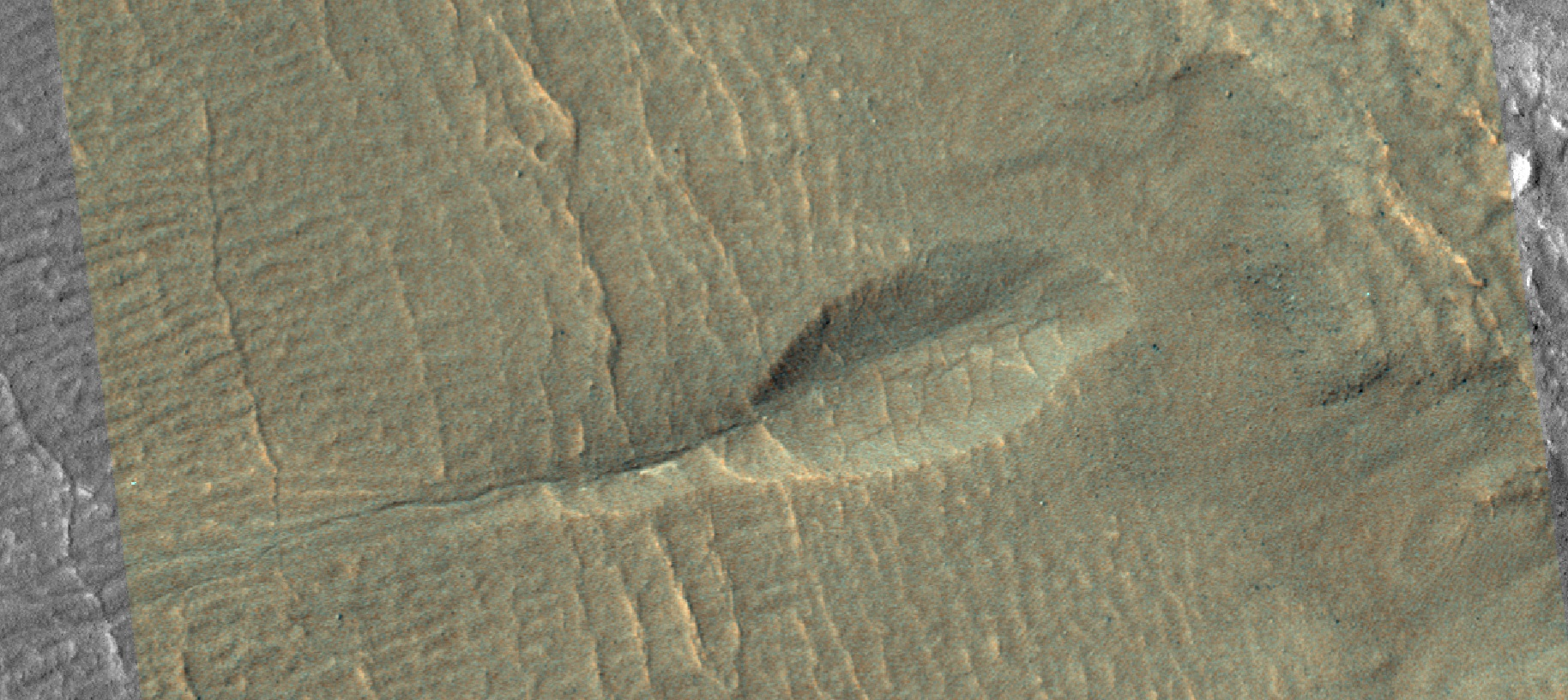
Small gully This gully may be in its initial state of formation.

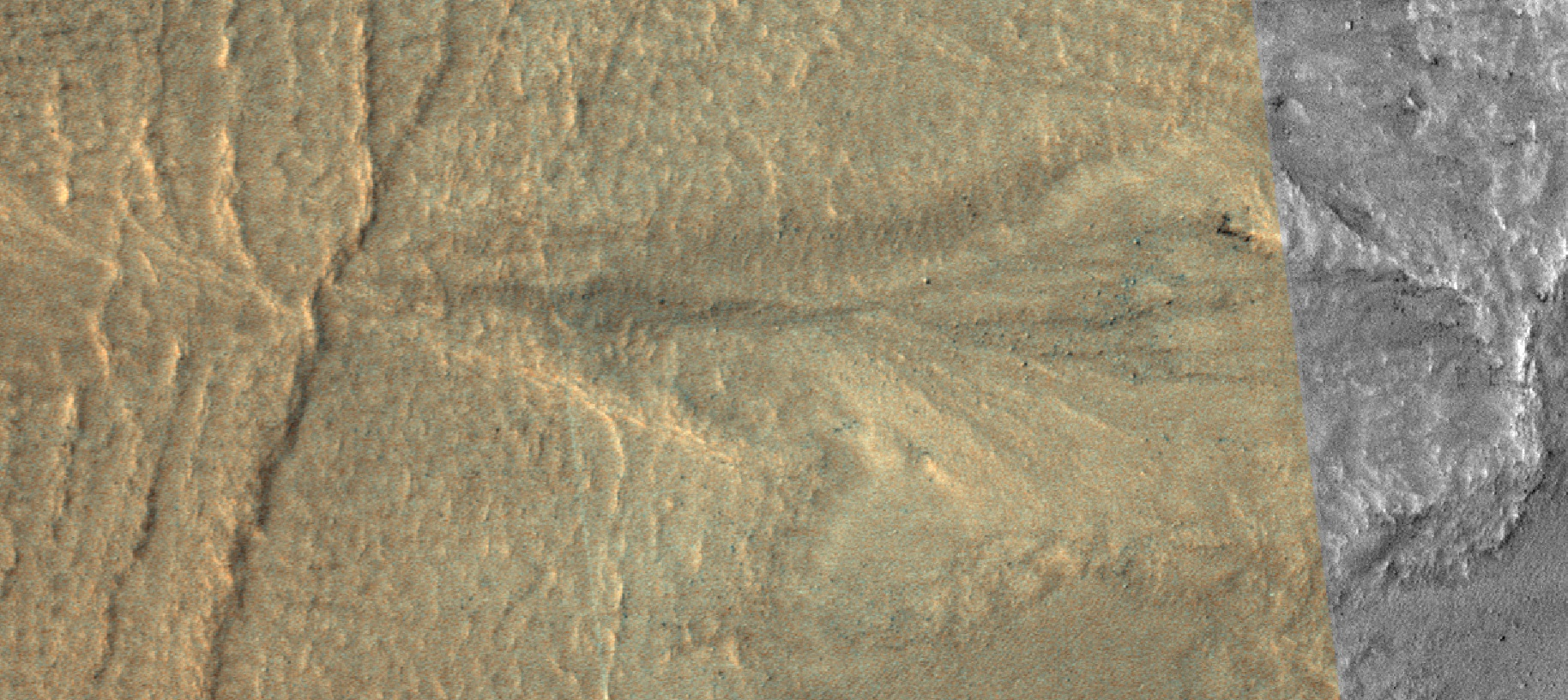
Gully, as seen by HiRISE

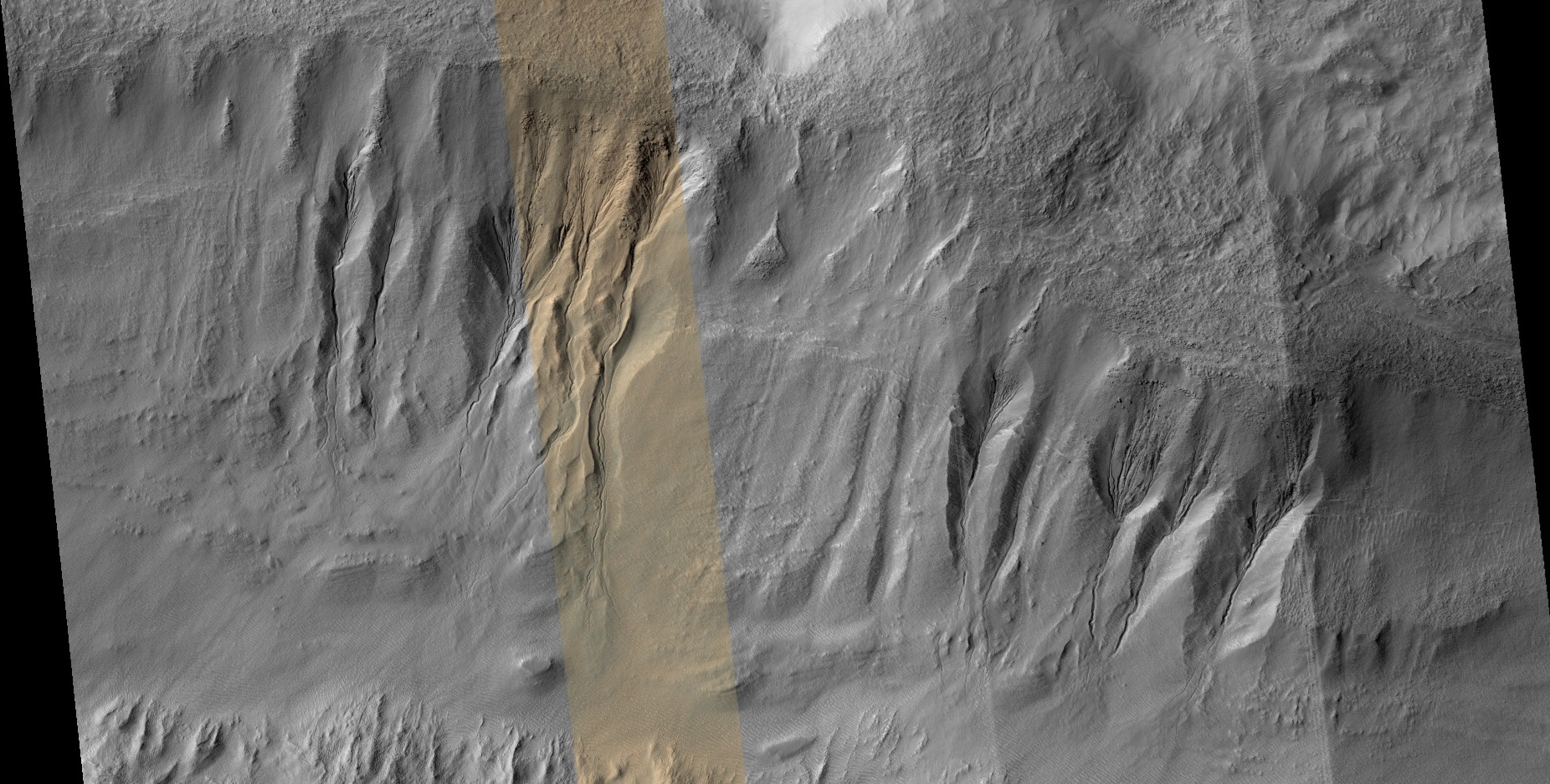
Wide view of gullies

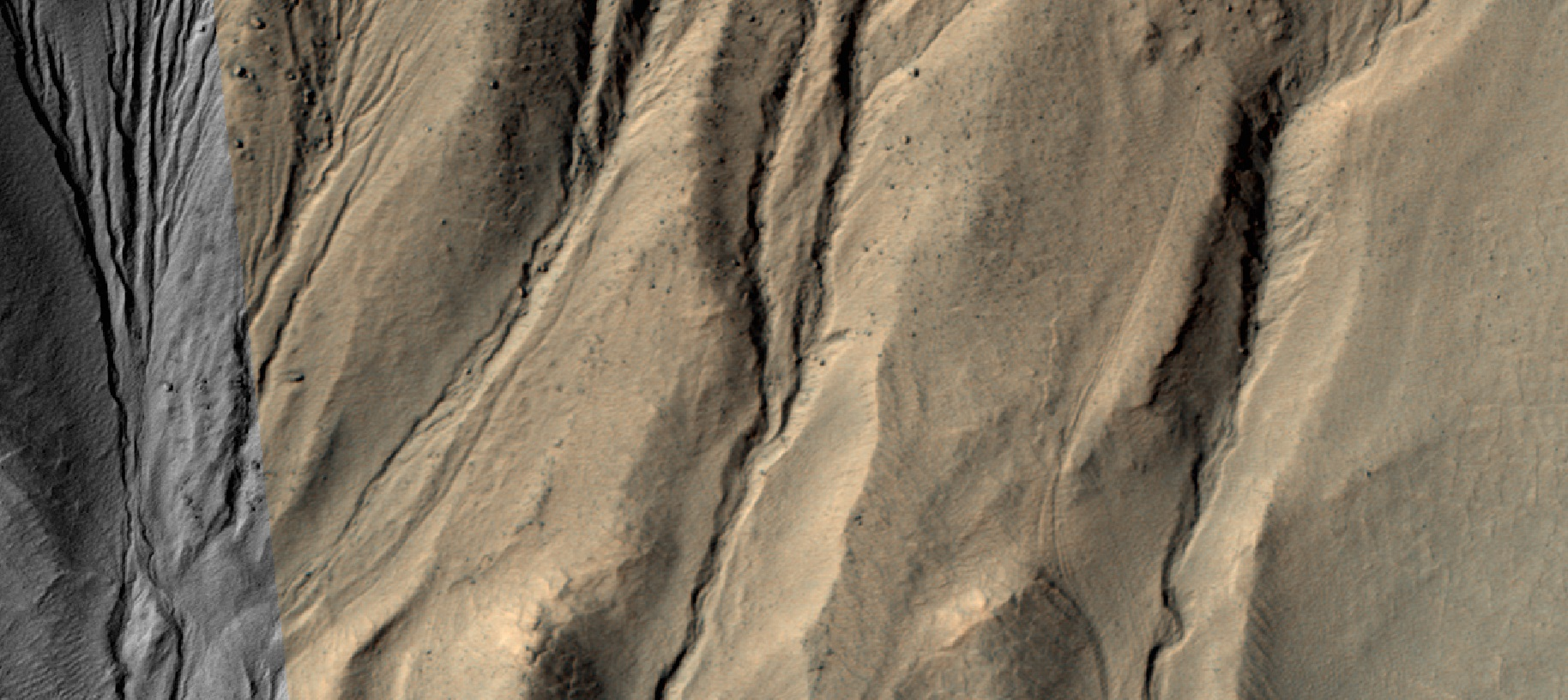
Close view of gully alcoves Picture is about 1 km across.

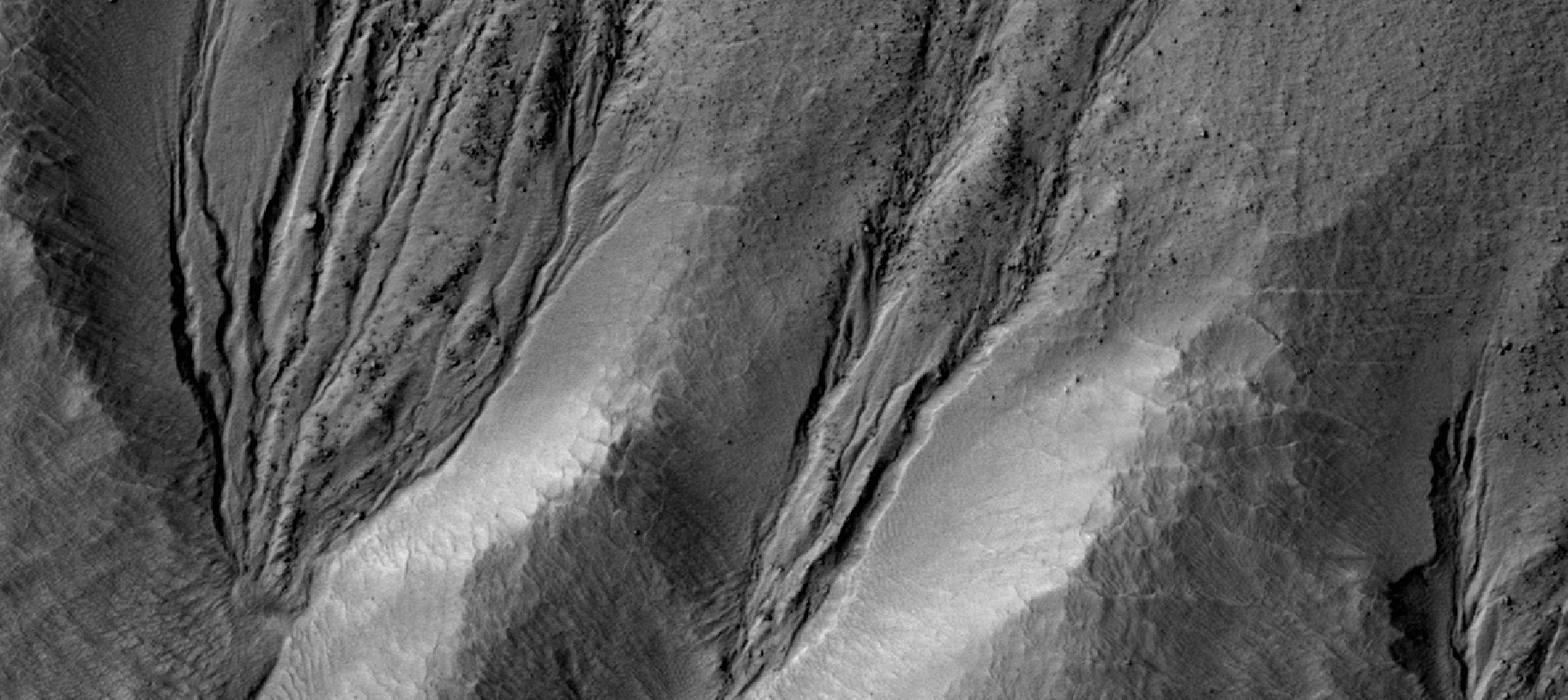
Close view of gully alcoves Picture is about 1 km across.

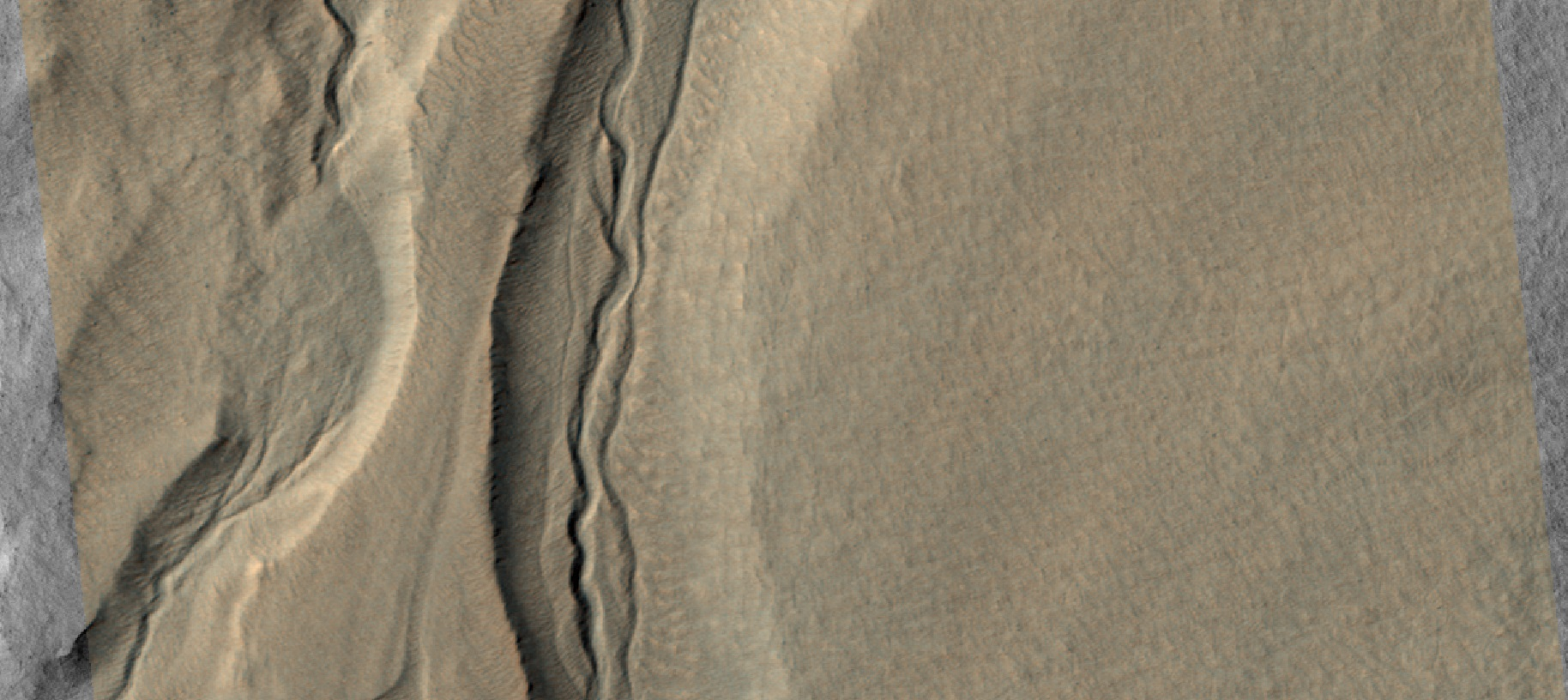
Close view of gully channels Picture is about 1 km across.

== Gullies on Dunes ==
Gullies are found on some dunes. These are somewhat different from gullies in other places, like the walls of craters. Gullies on dunes seem to keep the same width for a long distance and often just end with a pit, instead of an apron. They are often just a few meters across with raised banks along the sides. Many of these gullies are found on dunes in Russell (Martian crater). In the winter dry ice accumulates on the dunes and then in the spring dark spots appear and dark-toned streaks grow downhill. After the dry ice is gone, new channels are visible. These gullies may be caused by blocks of dry ice moving down the steep slope or perhaps from dry ice starts the sand moving. In the thin atmosphere of mars, dry ice will expel carbon dioxide with vigor.

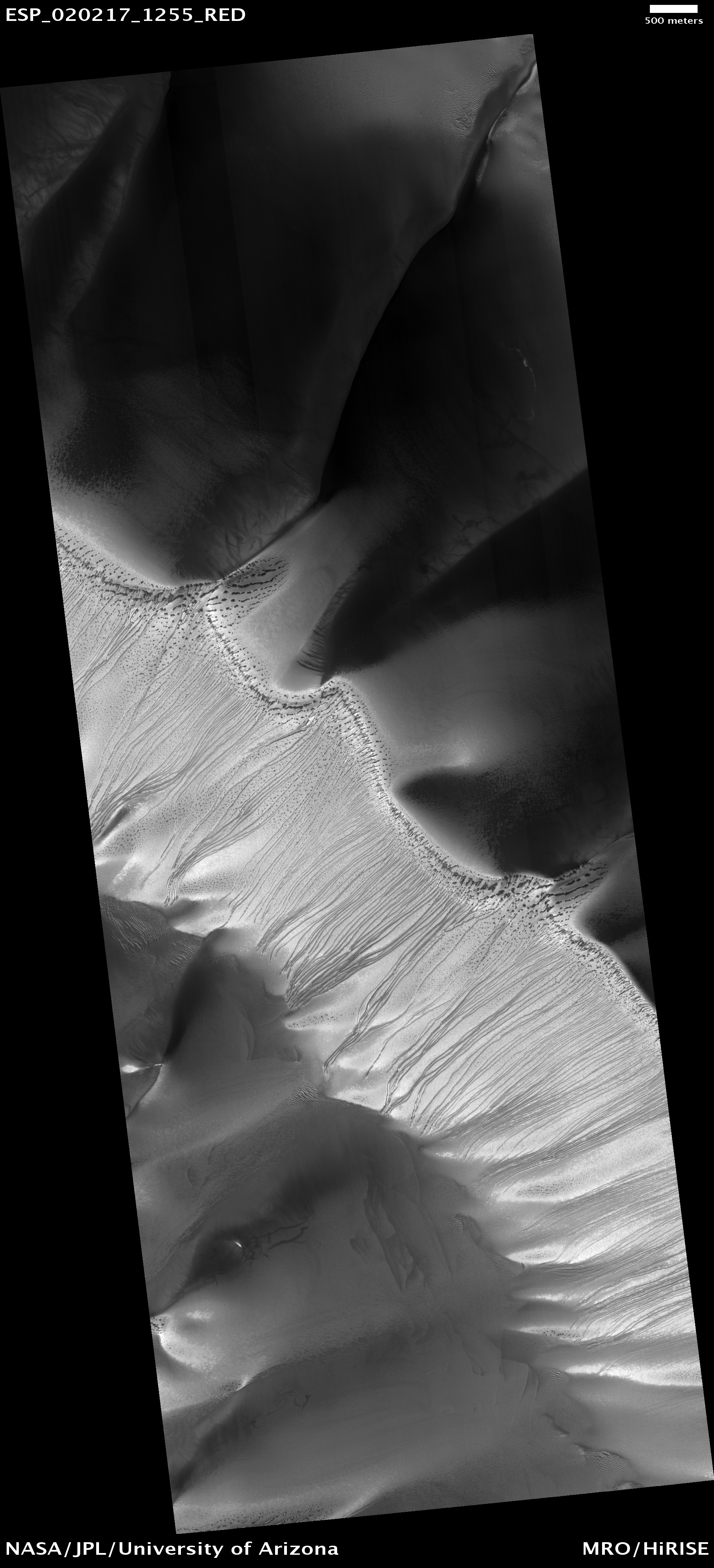
Wide view of dunes in Russell Crater, as seen by HiRISE Many narrow gullies are visible.

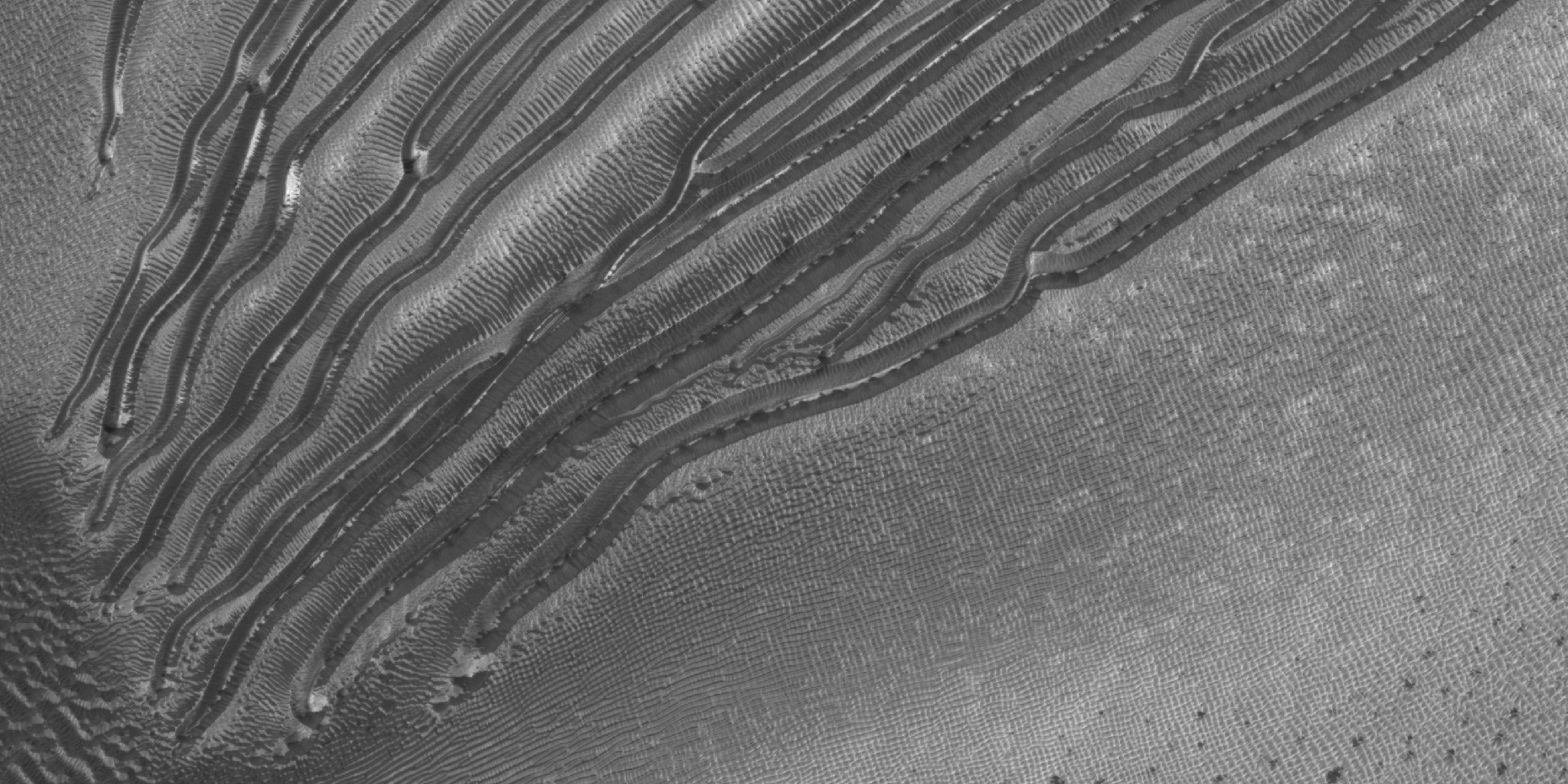
Close view of the end of gullies in Russell Crater, as seen by HiRISE Note: These types of gullies do not usually end with an apron. The location is Noachis quadrangle.

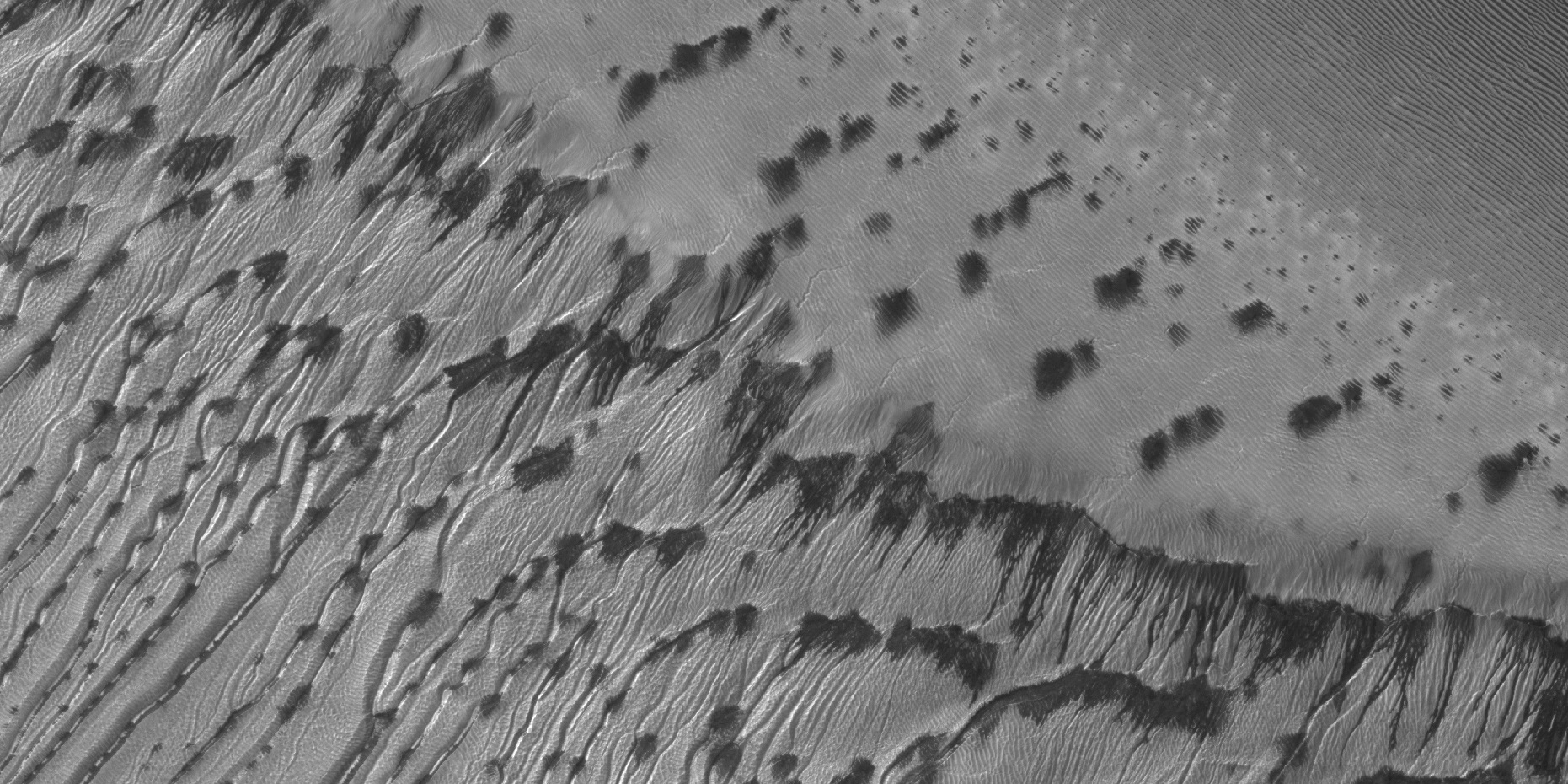
Close view of the end of gullies in Russell Crater, as seen by HiRISE

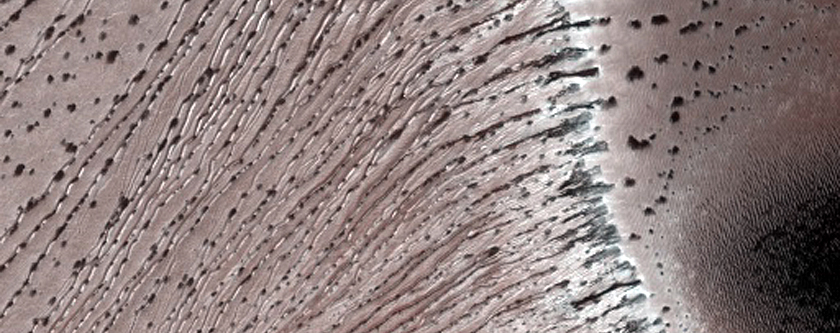
Close, color view of the end of gullies in Russell Crater, as seen by HiRISE

== Medusae Fossae Formation ==
The Medusae Fossae Formation is a soft, easily eroded deposit that extends for nearly 1,000 km along the equator of Mars. Sometimes the formation appears as a smooth and gently undulating surface; however, in places it is wind-sculpted into ridges and grooves. Radar imaging has suggested that the region may contain either extremely porous rock (for example volcanic ash) or deep layers of glacier-like ice deposits amounting to about the same quantity as is stored in Mars' south polar cap.

The lower portion (member) of Medusae Fossae Formation contains many patterns and shapes that are thought to be the remains of streams. It is believed that streams formed valleys that were filled and became resistant to erosion by cementation of minerals or by the gathering of a coarse covering layer. These inverted stream beds are sometimes called sinuous ridges or raised curvilinear features. They may be a kilometer or so in length. Their height ranges from a meter to greater than 10 meters, while the width of the narrow ones is less than 10 meters.

The wind has eroded the surface of the formation into a series of linear ridges called yardangs. These ridges generally point in the direction of the prevailing winds that carved them and demonstrate the erosive power of Martian winds. The easily eroded nature of the Medusae Fossae Formation suggests that it is composed of weakly cemented particles, and was most likely formed by the deposition of wind-blown dust or volcanic ash. Layers are seen in parts of the formation. A resistant caprock on the top of yardangs has been observed in Viking, Mars Global Surveyor, and HiRISE photos. Very few impact craters are visible throughout the area so the surface is relatively young.

Medusae Fossae Formation as seen with Mars Odyssey's THEMIS. Notice elongated formations called yardangs.

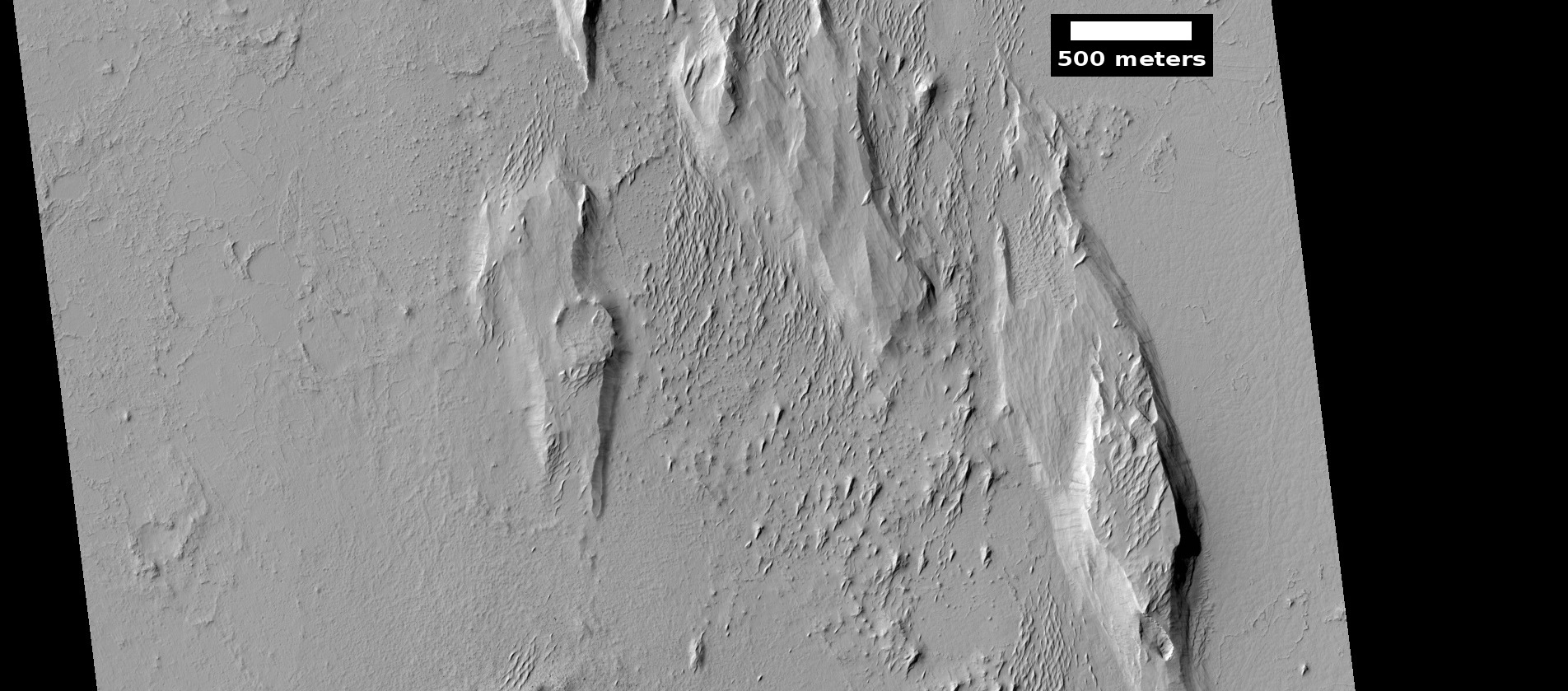
Yardangs of various sizes, as seen by HiRISE under HiWish program.

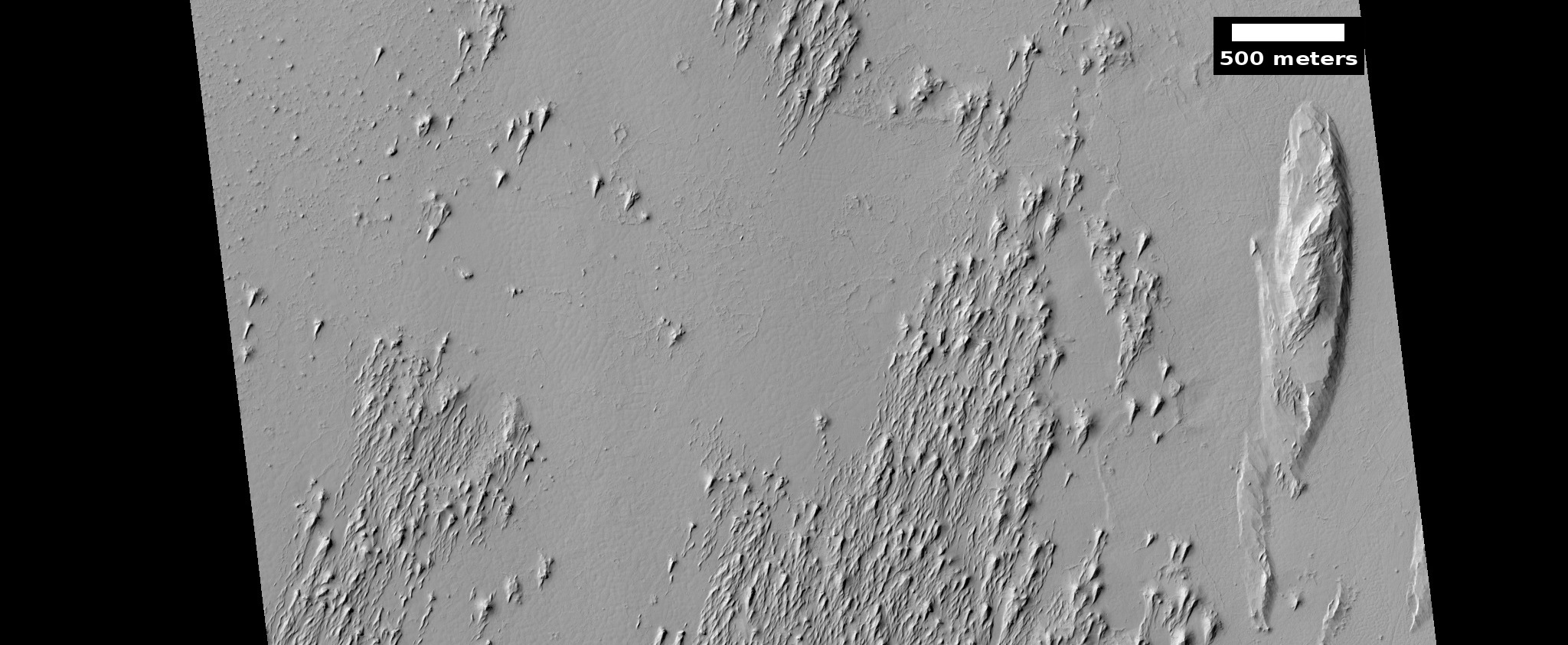
Yardangs of various sizes, as seen by HiRISE under HiWish program.

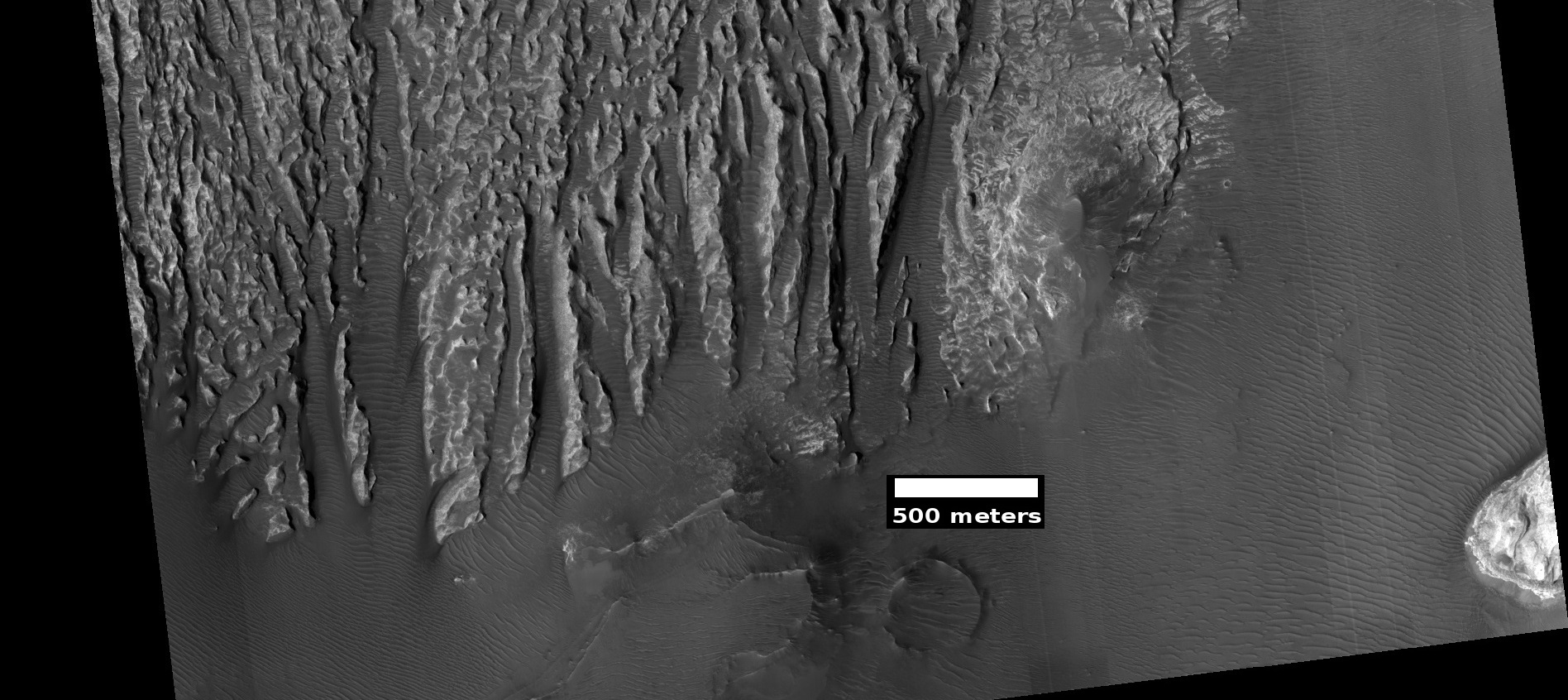
Yardangs formed in light-toned material and surrounded by dark, volcanic basalt sand, as seen by HiRISE under HiWish program.

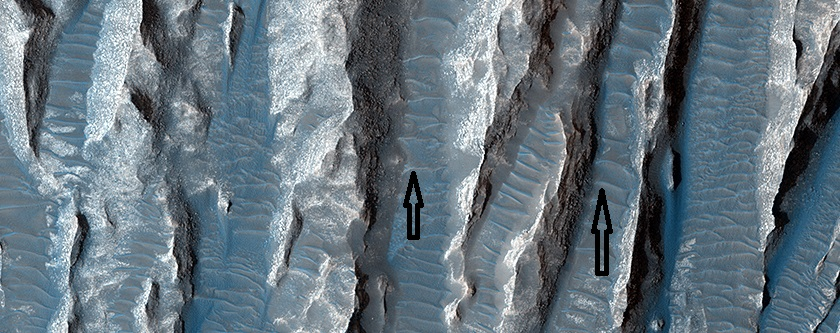
Close-up image of yardangs, as seen by HiRISE under HiWish program. Arrows point to transverse aeolian ridges, TAR's, a type of dune. Note this is an enlargement of the previous image from HiRISE.

== Yardangs ==
Yardangs are common in some regions on Mars, especially in the Medusae Fossae Formation of the Amazonis quadrangle and near the equator. They are formed by the action of wind on sand sized particles; hence they often point in the direction that the winds were blowing when they were formed. Because they exhibit very few impact craters they are believed to be relatively young.

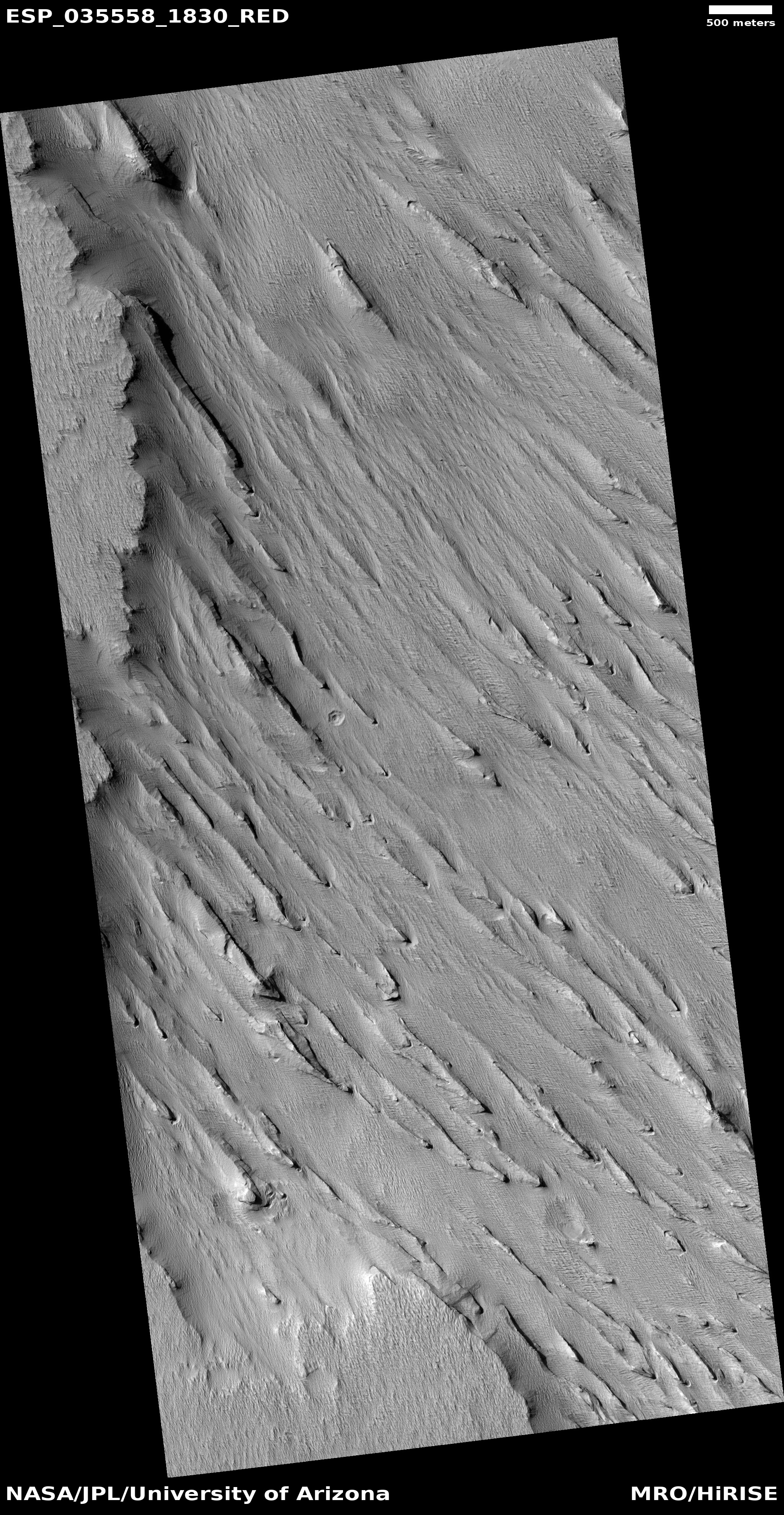
Yardangs, as seen by HiRISE under HiWish program Location is near Gordii Dorsum in the Amazonis quadrangle. These yardangs are in the upper member of the Medusae Fossae Formation.

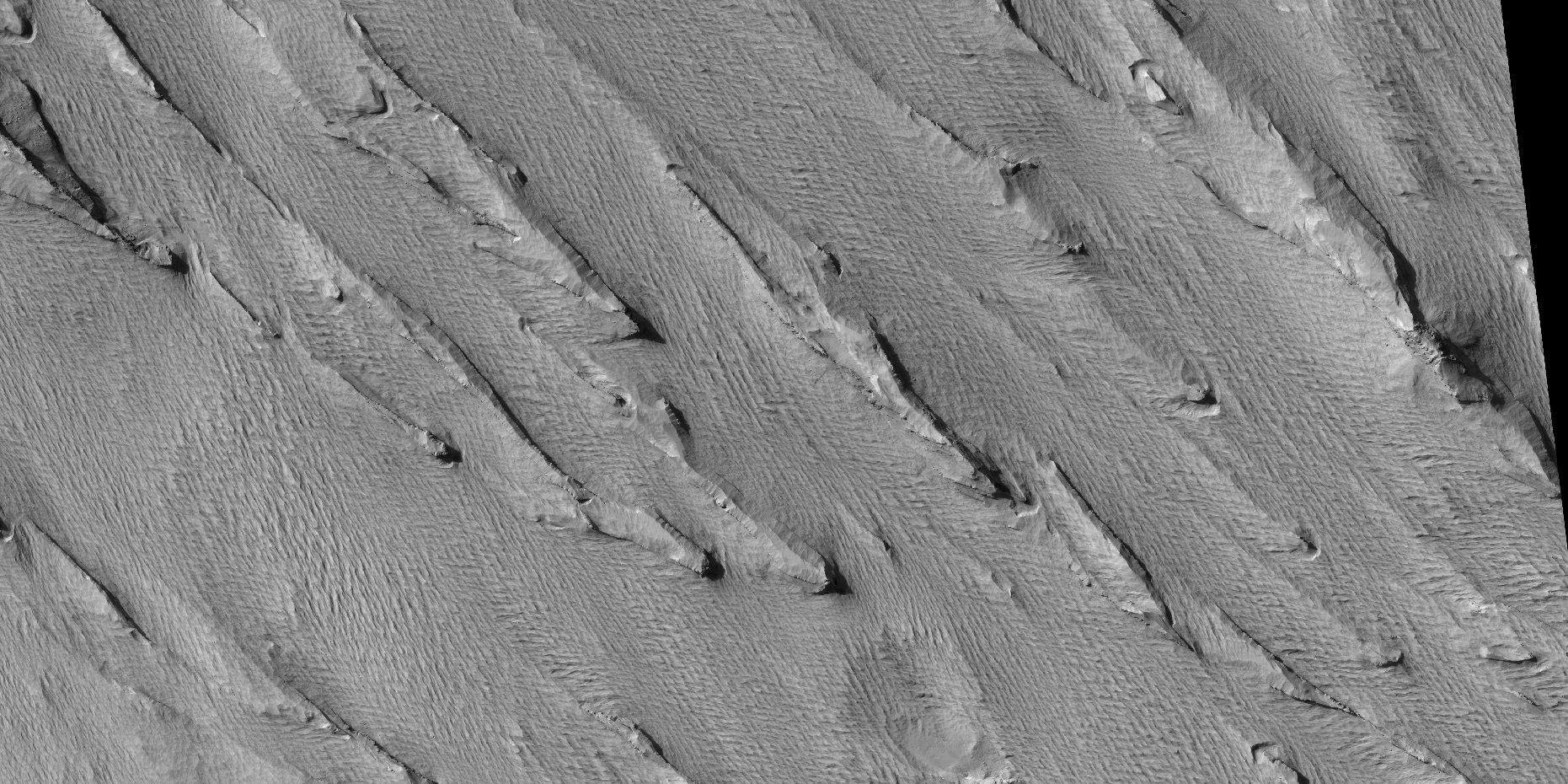
Yardangs, as seen by HiRISE under HiWish program Location is near Gordii Dorsum in the Amazonis quadrangle. Note: this is an enlargement of previous image.

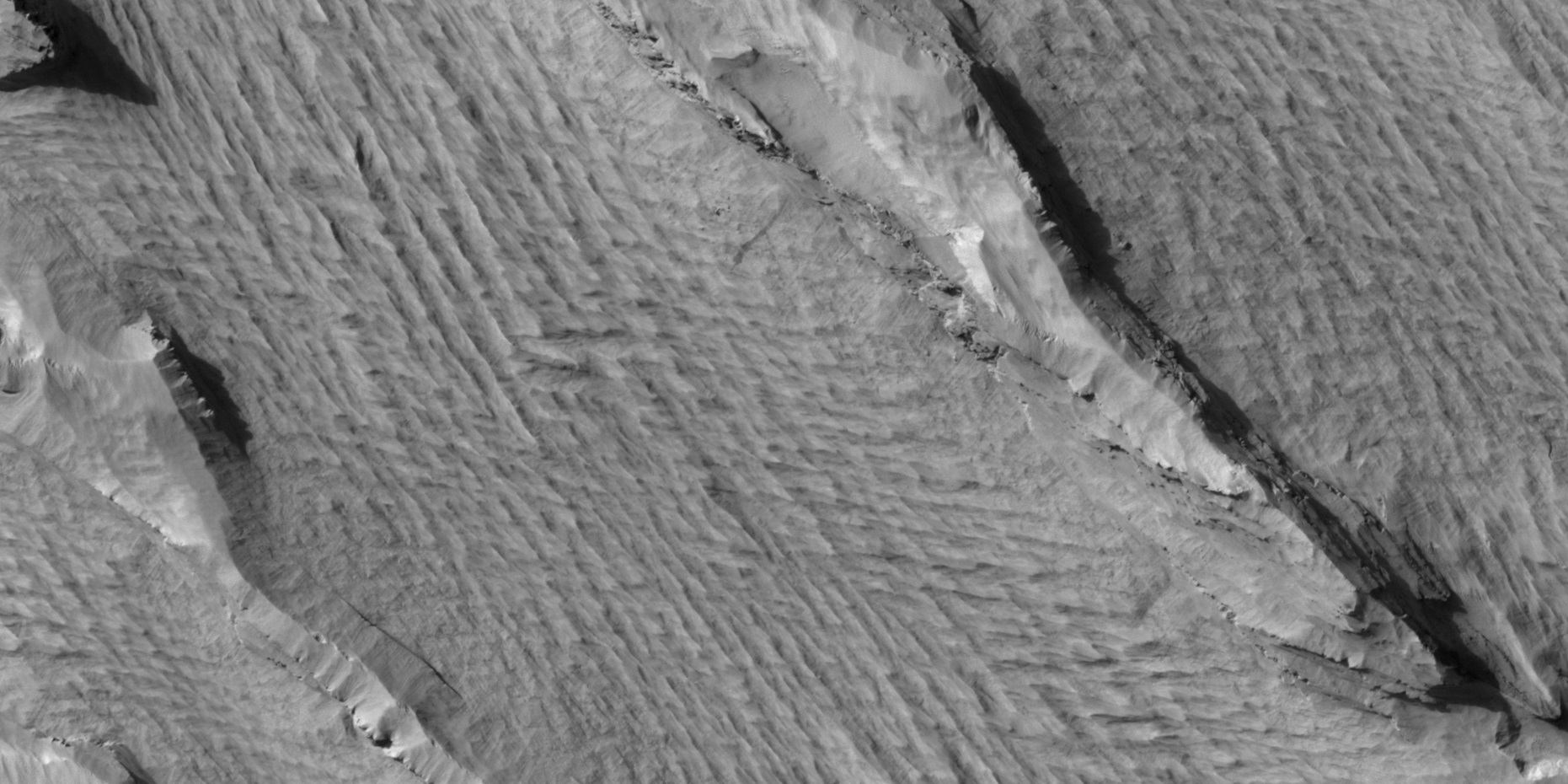
Yardangs, as seen by HiRISE under HiWish program Location is near Gordii Dorsum in the Amazonis quadrangle. Note: this is an enlargement of previous image.

== Fretted terrain ==
Fretted terrain is a type of surface feature common to certain areas of Mars and discovered in Mariner 9 images. It lies between two different surfaces. The surface of Mars can be divided into two parts: low, young, uncratered plains that cover most of the northern hemisphere, and high-standing, old, heavily cratered areas that cover the southern hemisphere and a small part of the northern hemisphere. Between these two zones is the fretted terrain, containing a complicated mix of cliffs, mesas, buttes, and straight-walled and sinuous canyons. Fretted terrain contains smooth, flat lowlands along with steep cliffs. The scarps or cliffs are usually 1 to 2 km high. Channels in the area have wide, flat floors and steep walls. Fretted terrain is most common in northern Arabia, between latitudes 30°N and 50°N and longitudes 270°W and 360°W. Parts of the fretted terrain are called Deuteronilus Mensae and Protonilus Mensae.

In fretted terrain, the land seems to transition from narrow straight valleys to isolated mesas. Most of the mesas are surrounded by forms that have been called a variety of names (circum-mesa aprons, debris aprons, rock glaciers, and lobate debris aprons). At first they appeared to resemble rock glaciers on Earth, but scientists could not be sure. Eventually, proof of their true nature was discovered by radar studies with the Mars Reconnaissance Orbiter and showed that they contain pure water ice covered with a thin layer of rocks that insulated the ice.

In addition to rock covered glaciers around mesas, the region has many steep-walled valleys with lineations—ridges and grooves—on their floors. The material comprising these valley floors is called lineated valley fill. In some of the best images taken by the Viking Orbiters, some of the valley fill appeared to resemble alpine glaciers on Earth. Given this similarity, some scientists assumed that the lineations on these valley floors might have formed by flow of ice in (and perhaps through) these canyons and valleys. Today, it is generally agreed that glacial flow caused the lineations.

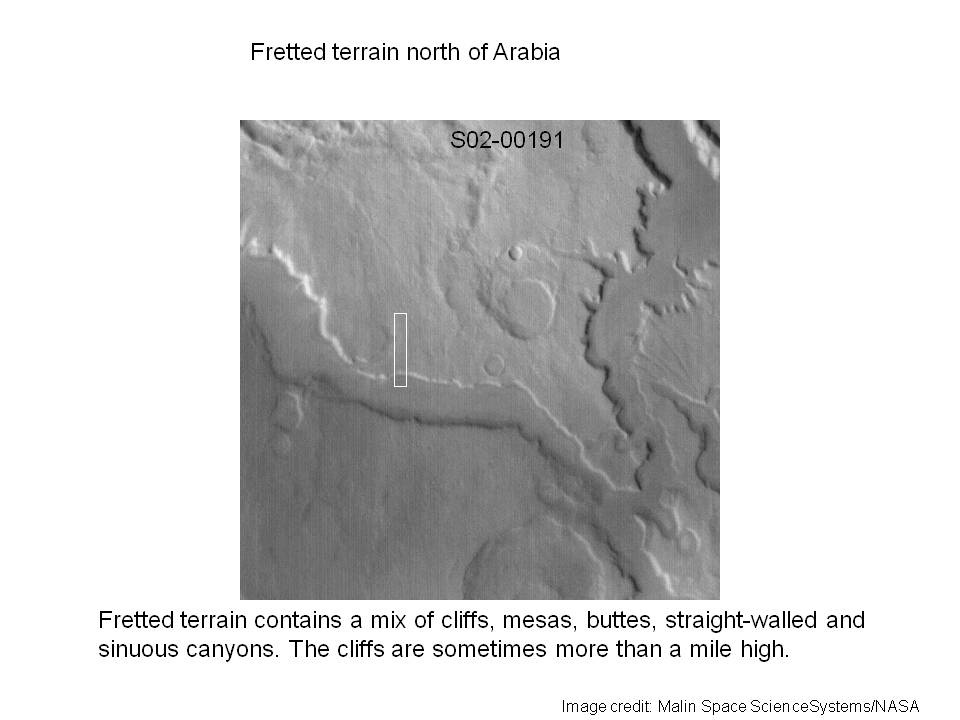
Fretted terrain of Ismenius Lacus showing flat floored valleys and cliffs. Photo taken with Mars Orbiter Camera (MOC)on the Mars Global Surveyor.

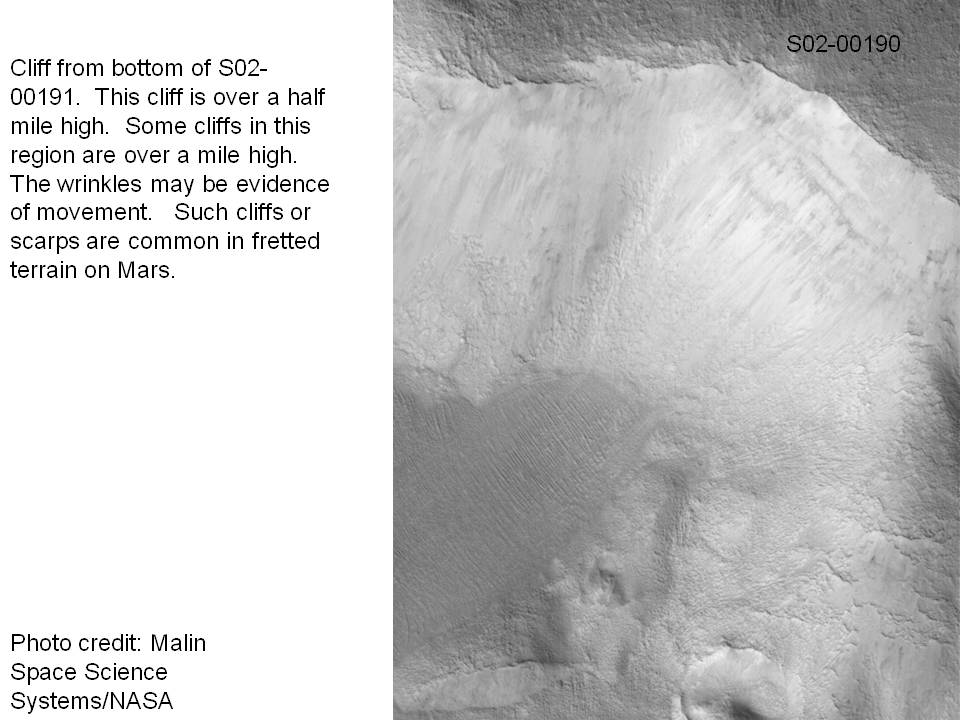
Enlargement of the photo on the left showing cliff. Photo taken with high resolution camera of Mars Global Surveyor (MGS).

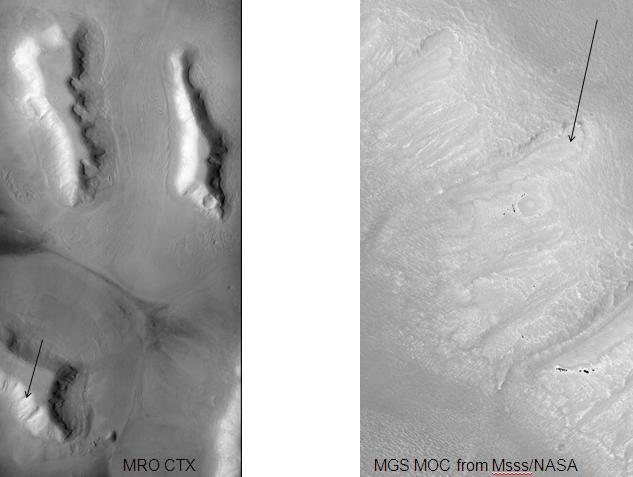
The arrow in the left picture points to a possibly valley carved by a glacier. The image on the right shows the valley greatly enlarged in a Mars Global Surveyor image.

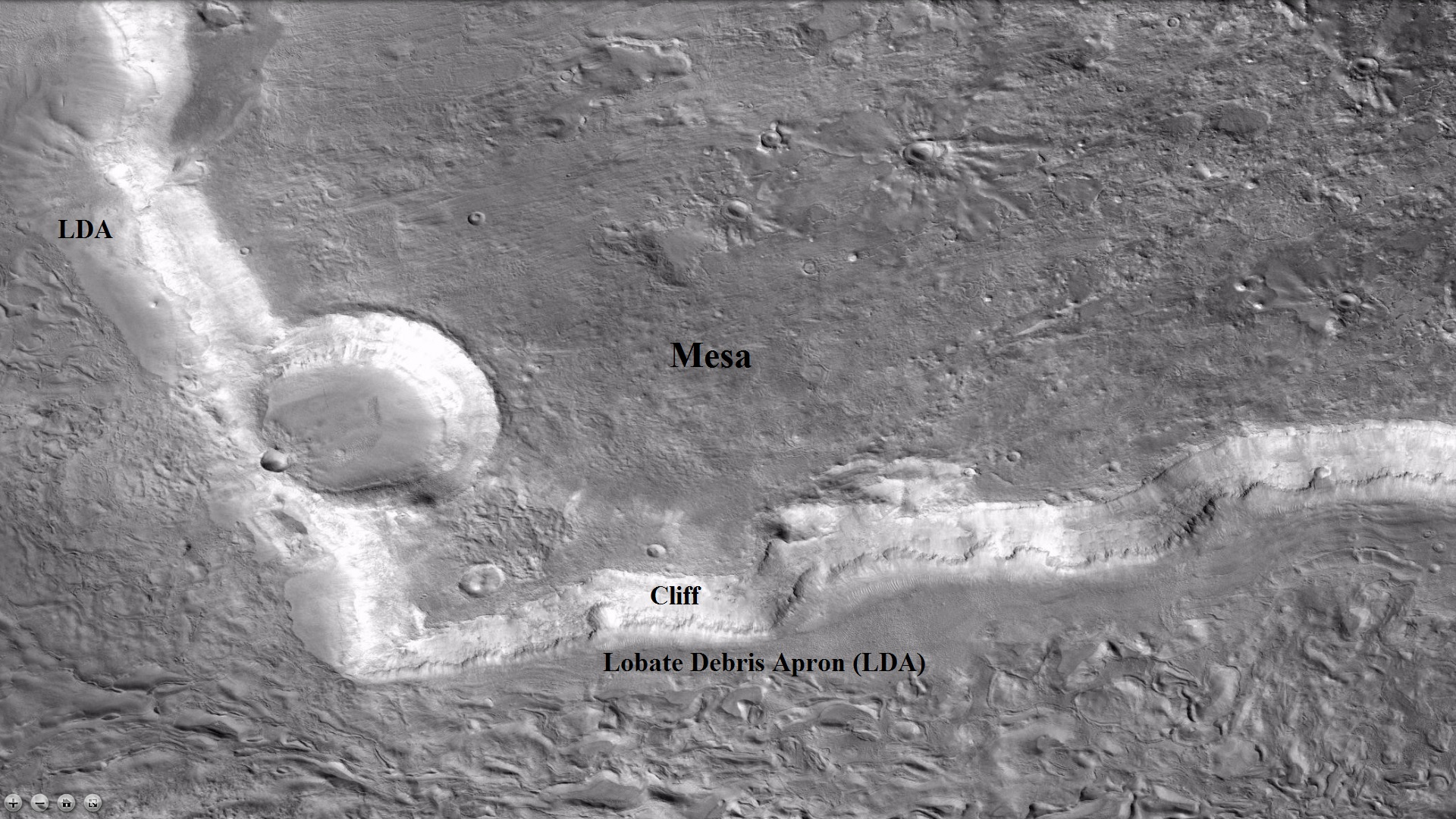
Wide view of mesa with CTX showing Cliff face and location of lobate debris apron (LDA). Location is Ismenius Lacus quadrangle.

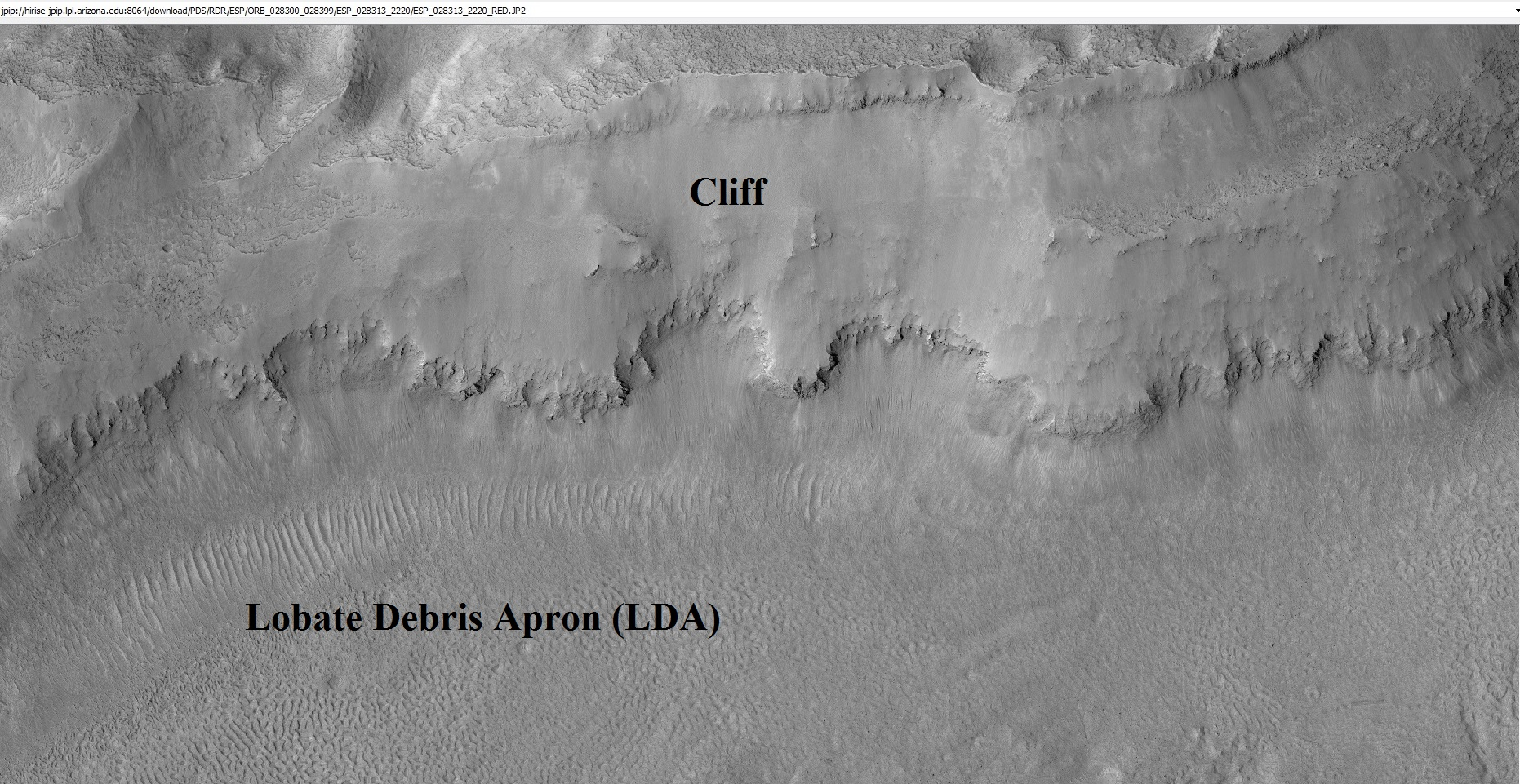
Enlargement of previous CTX image of mesa This image shows the cliff face and detail in the LDA. Image taken with HiRISE under HiWish program. Location is Ismenius Lacus quadrangle.

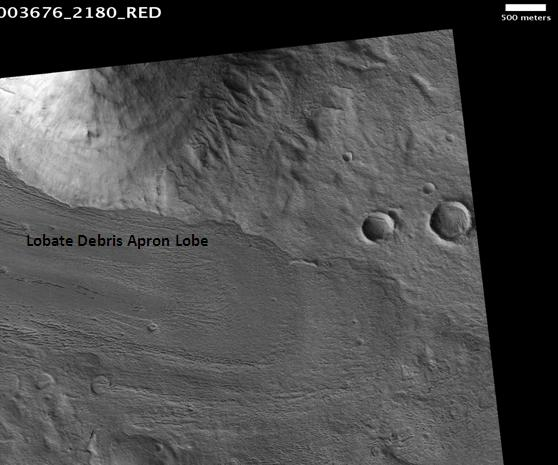
Lobate debris apron in Phlegra Montes, as seen by HiRISE. The debris apron is probably mostly ice with a thin covering of rock debris, so it could be a source of water for future Martian colonists. Image from the Cebrenia quadrangle. Scale bar is 500 meters long.

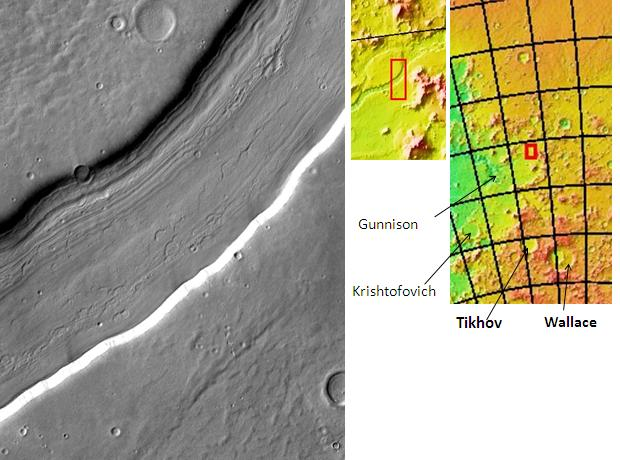
Reull Vallis with lineated floor deposits, as seen by THEMIS. Image located in Hellas quadrangle. Click on image to see relationship to other features.
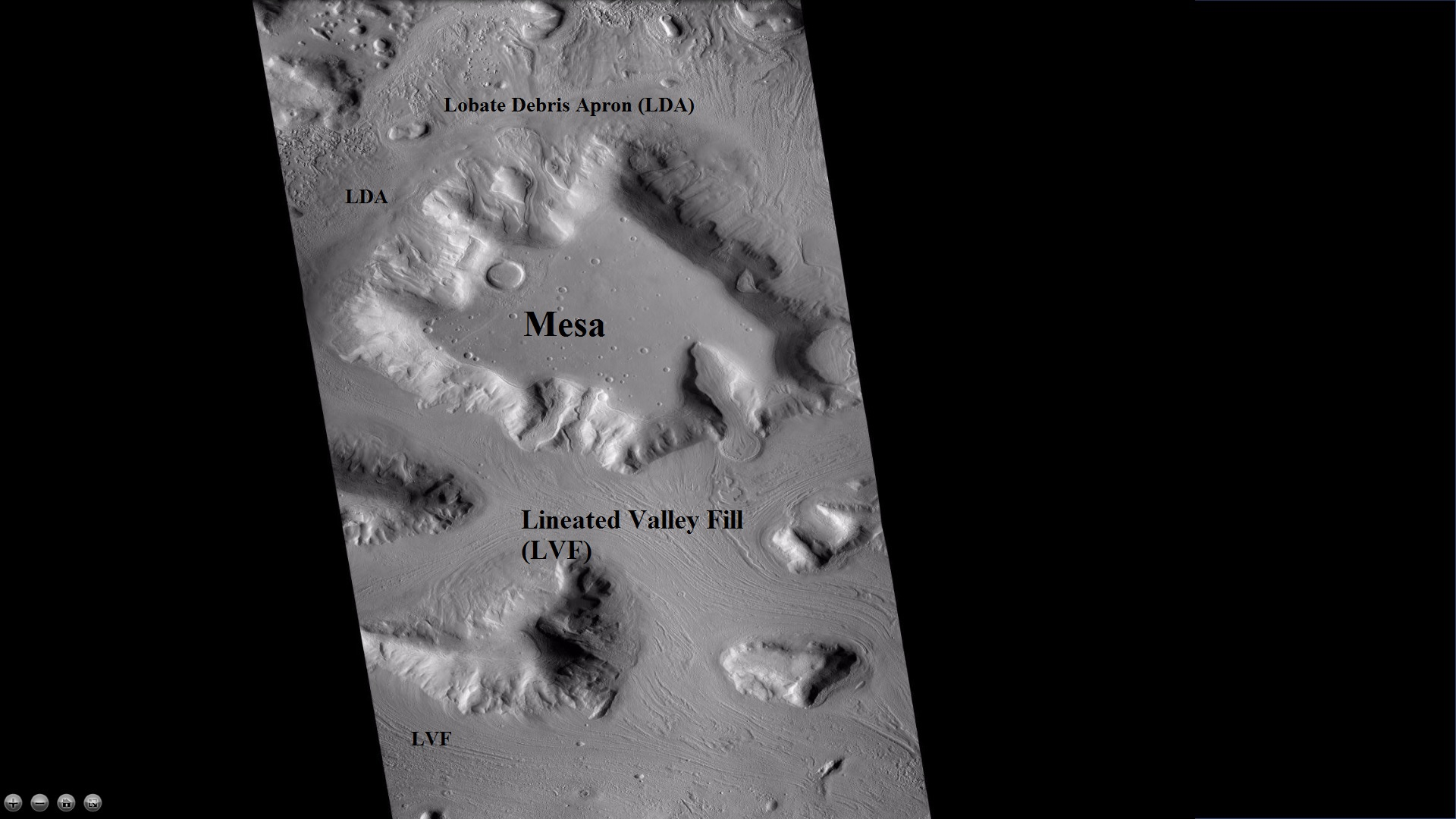
Wide CTX view showing mesa and buttes with lobate debris aprons and lineated valley fill around them. Location is Ismenius Lacus quadrangle.

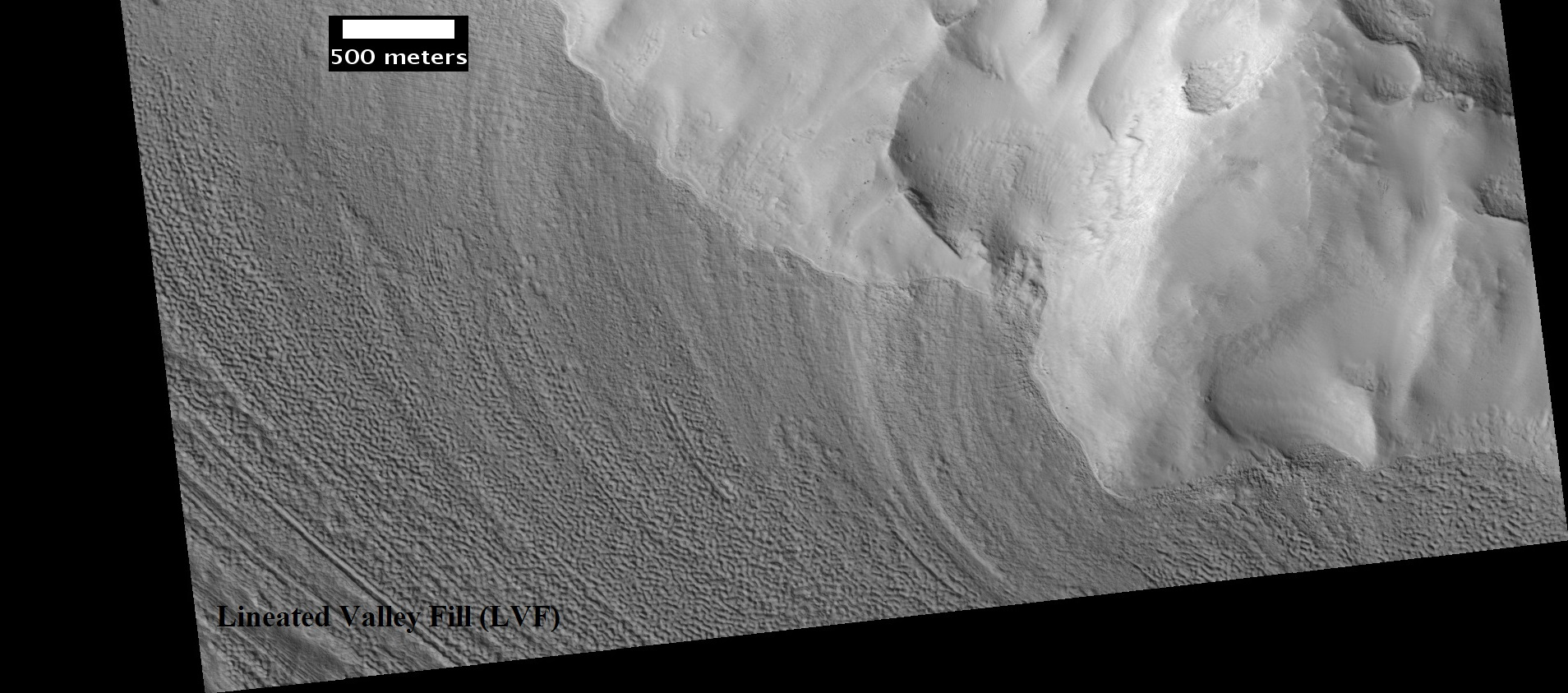
Close-up of lineated valley fill (LVF), as seen by HiRISE under HiWish program Note: this is an enlargement of the previous CTX image.

== Glaciers ==
Glaciers, loosely defined as patches of currently or recently flowing ice, are thought to be present across large but restricted areas of the modern Martian surface, and are inferred to have been more widely distributed at times in the past.

Analysis of SHARAD radar data led researchers to conclude that Martian glaciers are 80% pure ice.

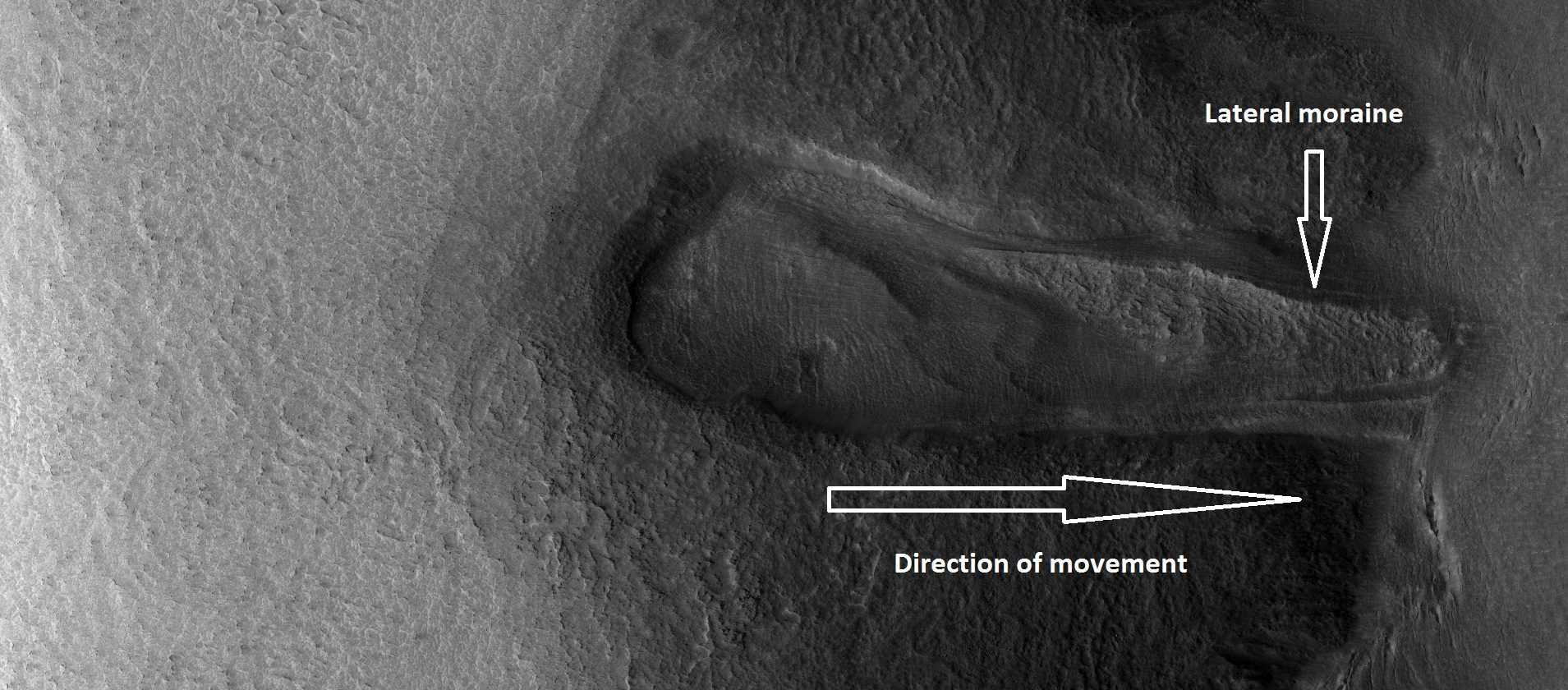
Martian glacier moving down a valley, as seen by HiRISE under HiWish program.

|

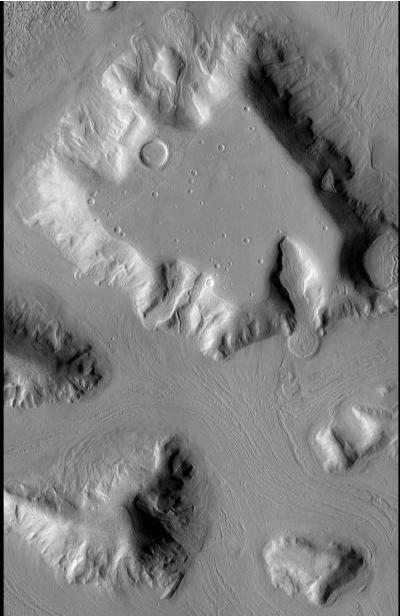
Mesa in Ismenius Lacus quadrangle, as seen by CTX. Mesa has several glaciers eroding it. One of the glaciers is seen in greater detail in the next two images from HiRISE. Image from Ismenius Lacus quadrangle.

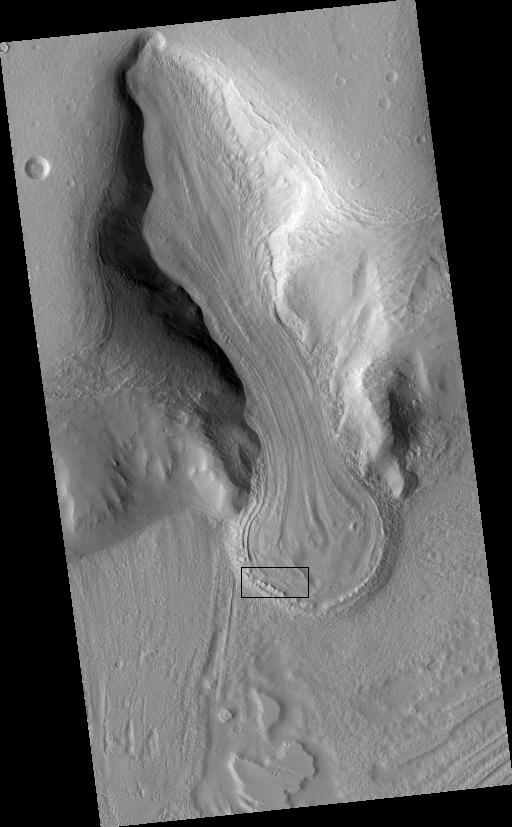
Glacier as seen by HiRISE under the HiWish program. Area in rectangle is enlarged in the next photo. Zone of accumulation of snow at the top. Glacier is moving down valley, then spreading out on plain. Evidence for flow comes from the many lines on surface. Location is in Protonilus Mensae in Ismenius Lacus quadrangle.

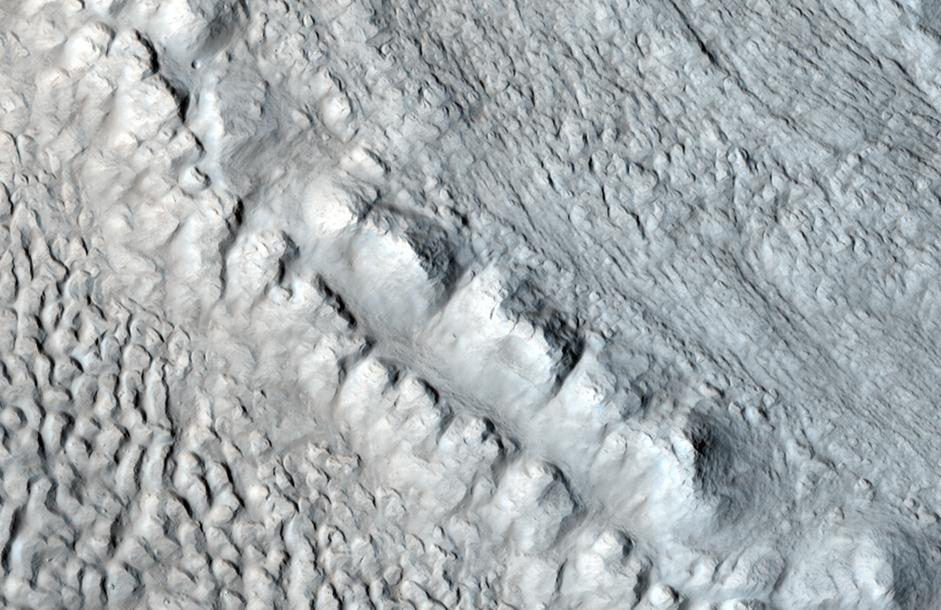
Enlargement of area in rectangle of the previous image. On Earth the ridge would be called the terminal moraine of an alpine glacier. Picture taken with HiRISE under the HiWish program. Image from Ismenius Lacus quadrangle.

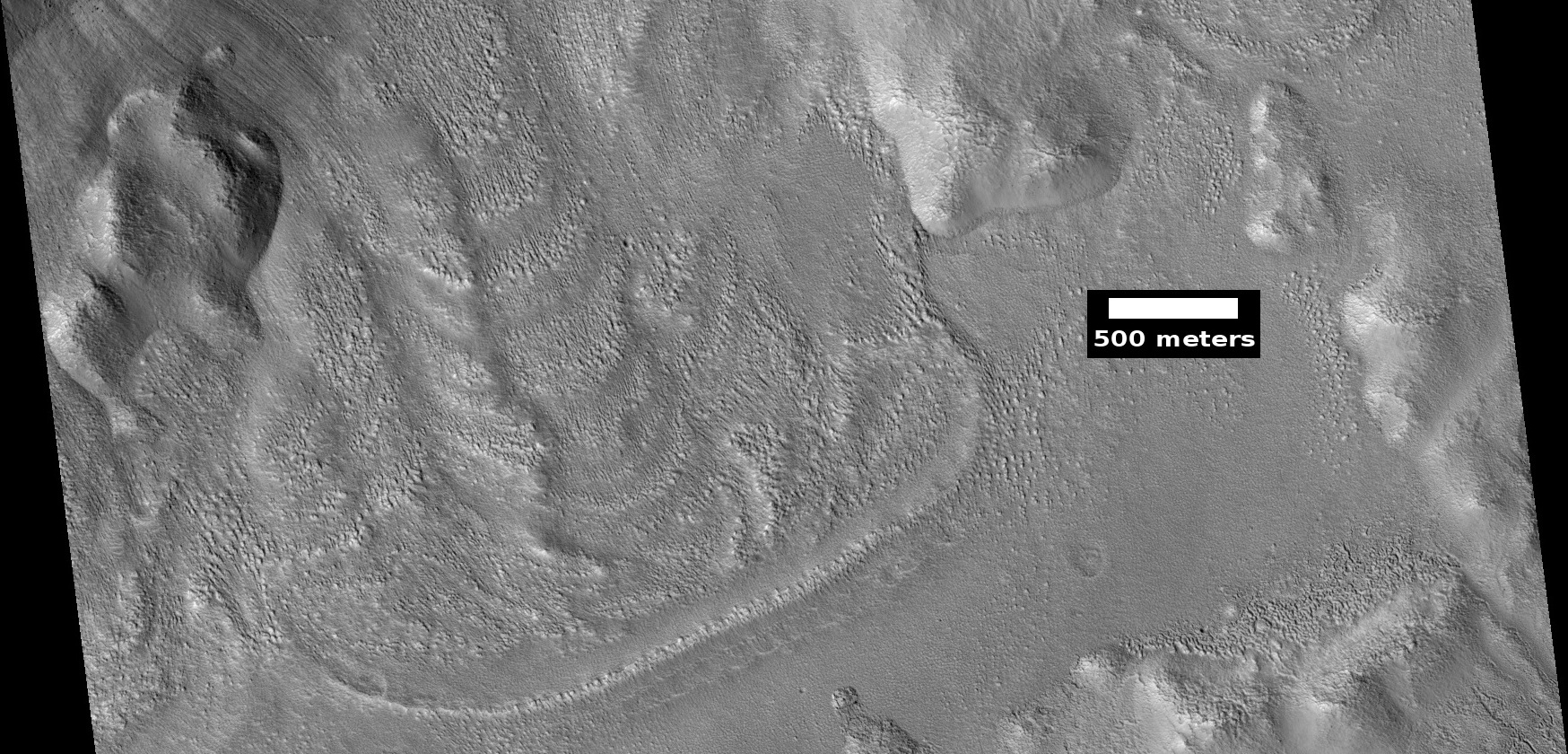
Glacier coming out of valley, as seen by HiRISE under HiWish program Location is rim of Moreux Crater. Location is Ismenius Lacus quadrangle.

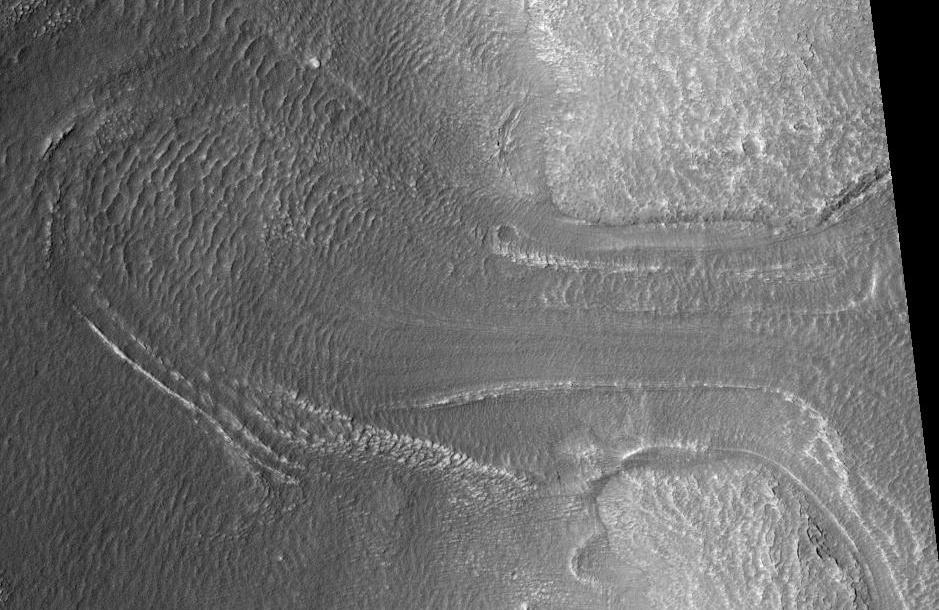
Probable glacier as seen by HiRISE under HiWish program. Radar studies have found that it is made up of almost totally of pure ice. It appears to be moving from the high ground (a mesa) on the right. Location is Ismenius Lacus quadrangle.
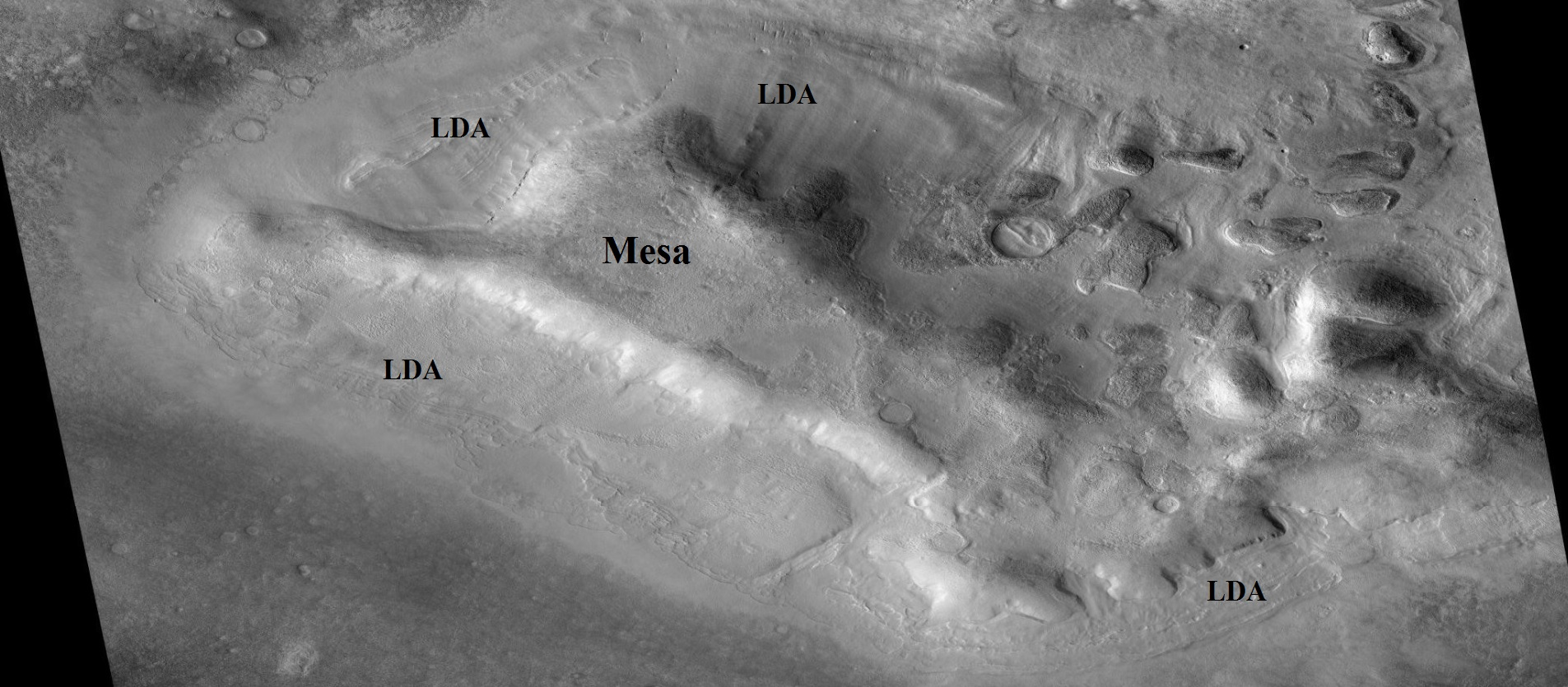
Lobate debris aprons (LDAs) around a mesa, as seen by CTX. Mesa and LDAs are labeled so one can see their relationship. Radar studies have determined that LDAs contain ice; therefore, these can be important for future colonists of Mars. Location is Ismenius Lacus quadrangle.
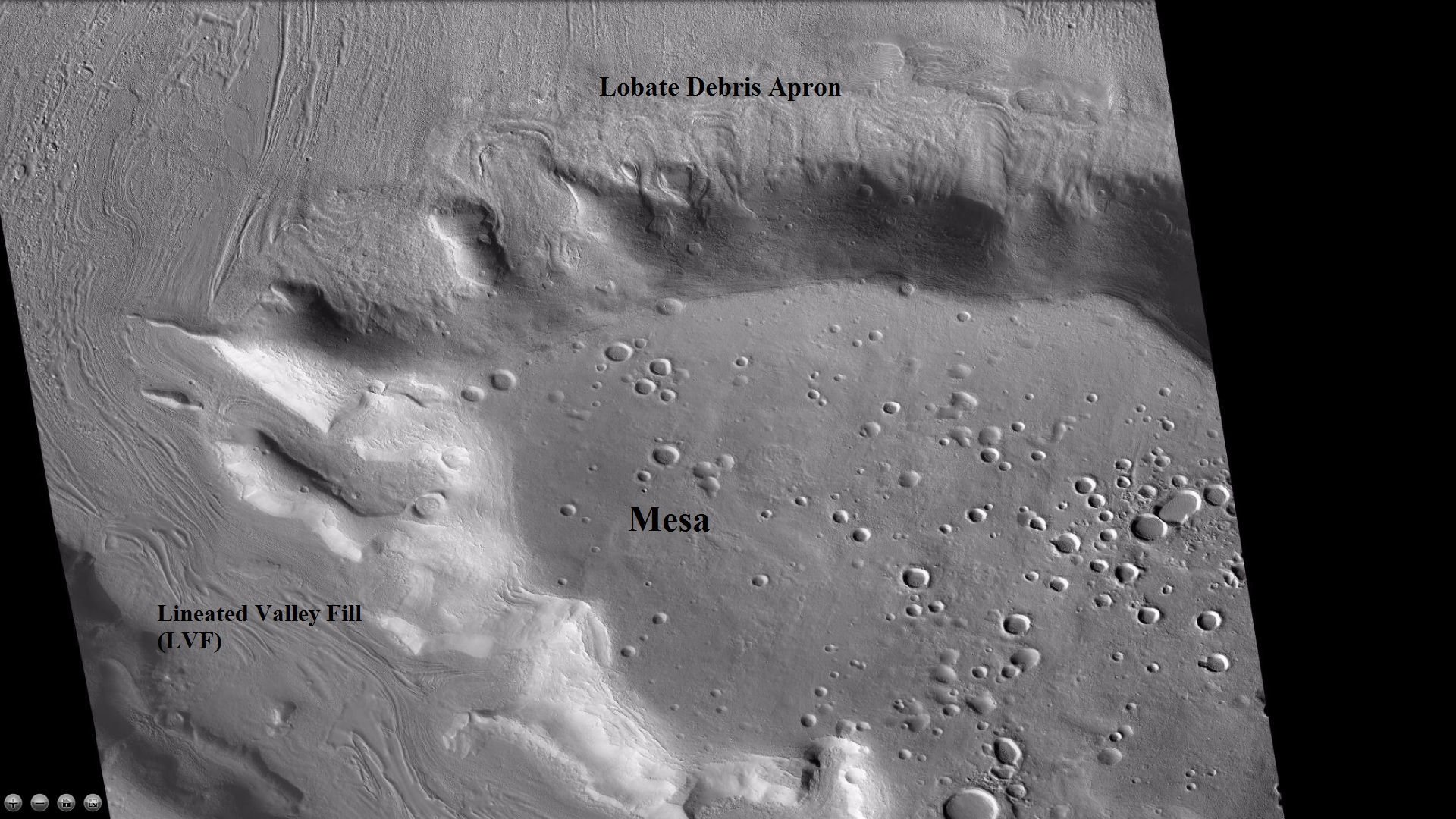
Wide CTX view of mesa showing lobate debris apron (LDA) and lineated valley fill. Both are believed to be debris covered glaciers. Location is Ismenius Lacus quadrangle.

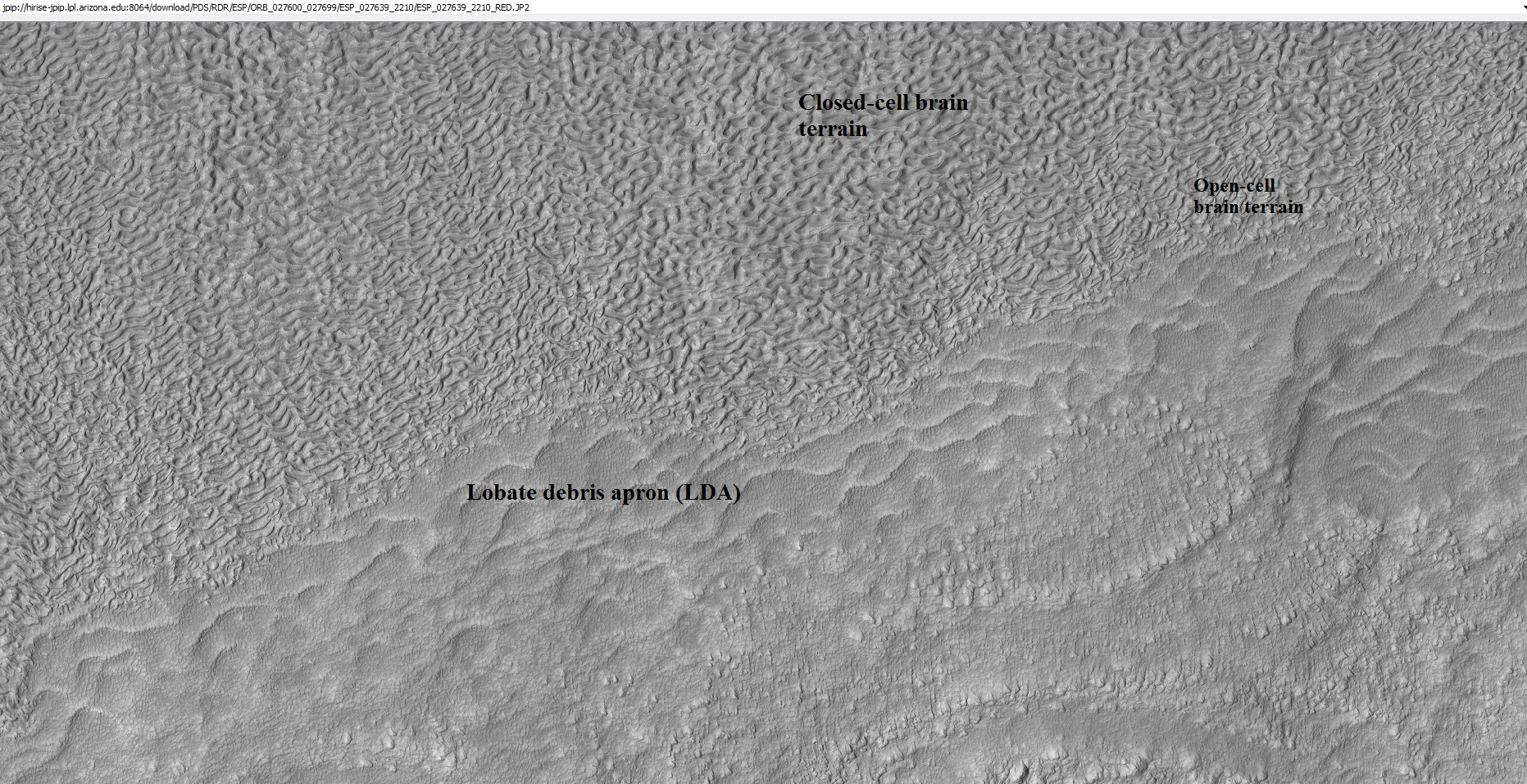
Close-up of lobate debris apron from the previous CTX image of a mesa. Image shows open-cell brain terrain and closed-cell brain terrain, which is more common. Open-cell brain terrain is thought to hold a core of ice. Image is from HiRISE under HiWish program.

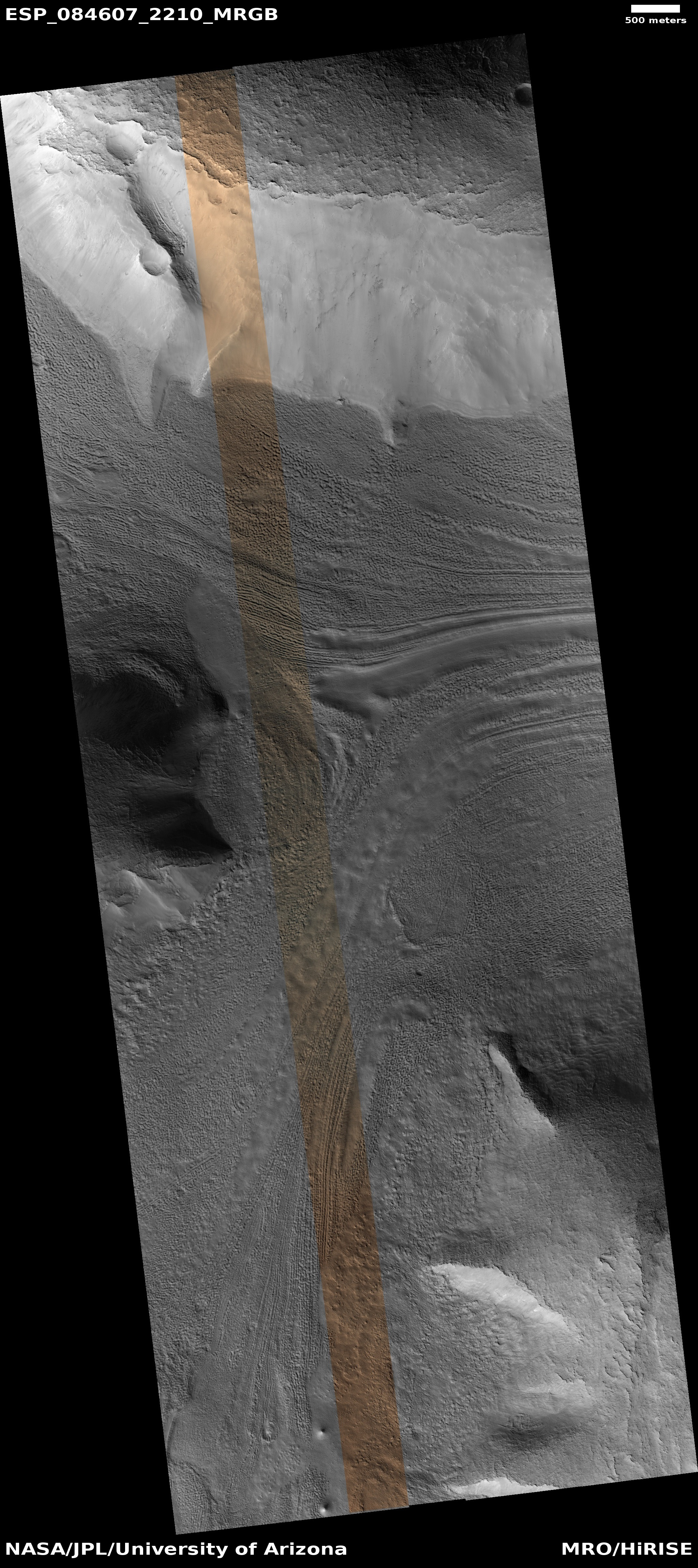
Lineated valley fill in valley, as seen by HiRISE under HiWish program. Linear valley flow is ice covered by debris. Lineated valley fill is generally considered to be an example of a glacier, as it involves the movement of ice.

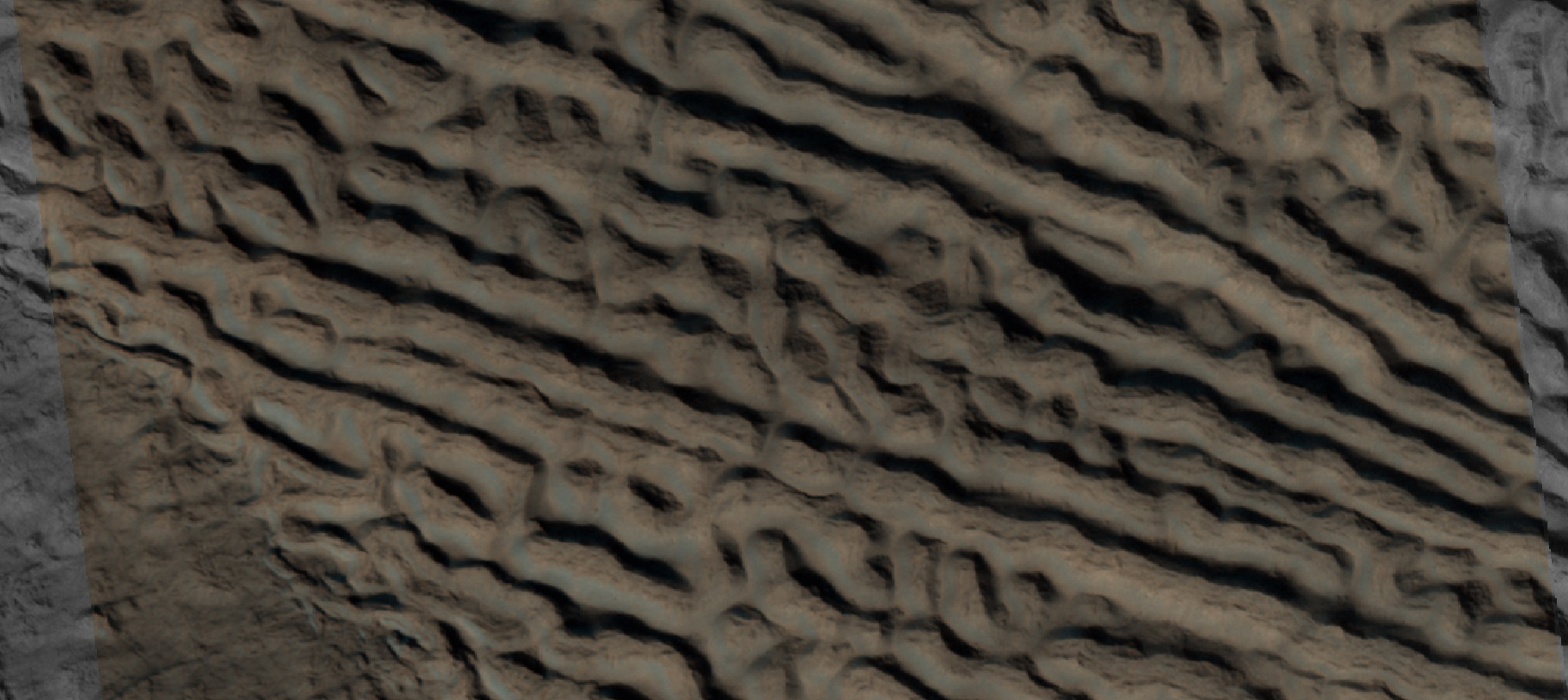
Close view of lineated valley fill (LVF) in valley, as seen by HiRISE under HiWish program. Linear valley flow is ice covered by debris. Picture is about 1 km wide. Lineated valley fill is generally considered to be an example of a glacier, as it involves the movement of ice.

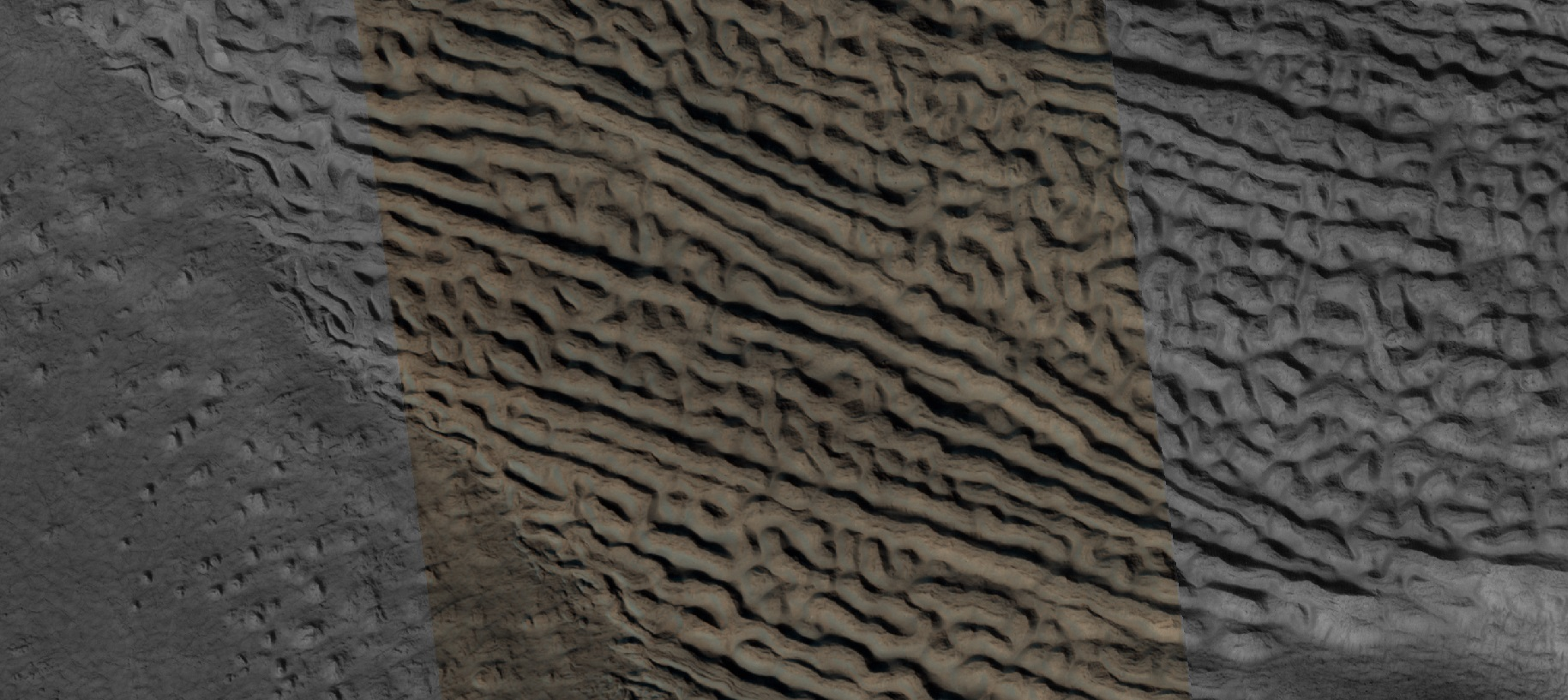
Close view of lineated valley fill (LVF) in valley, as seen by HiRISE under HiWish program. Linear valley flow is ice covered by debris. Lineated valley fill is generally considered to be an example of a glacier, as it involves the movement of ice.

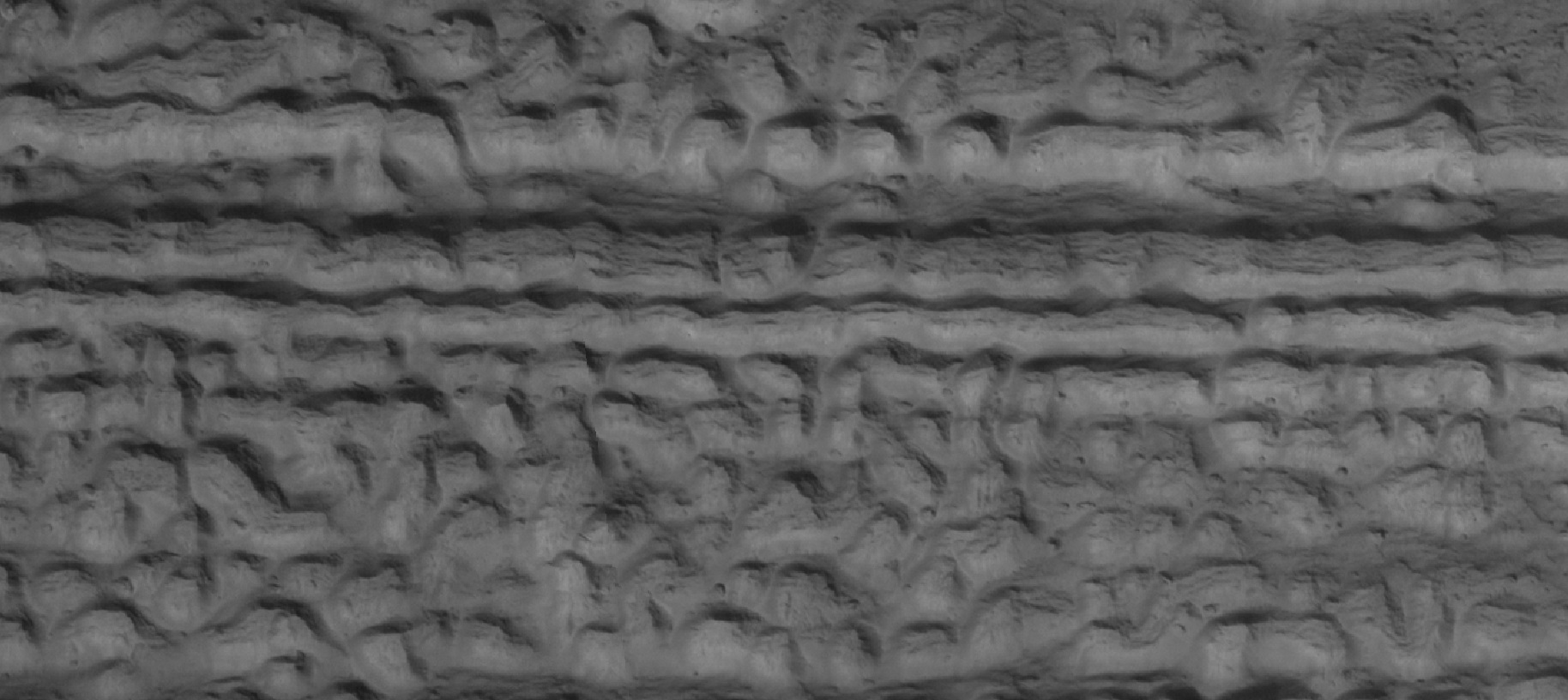
Close view of lineated valley fill (LVF) in valley, as seen by HiRISE under HiWish program. Linear valley flow is ice covered by debris. Lineated valley fill is generally considered to be an example of a glacier, as it involves the movement of ice.

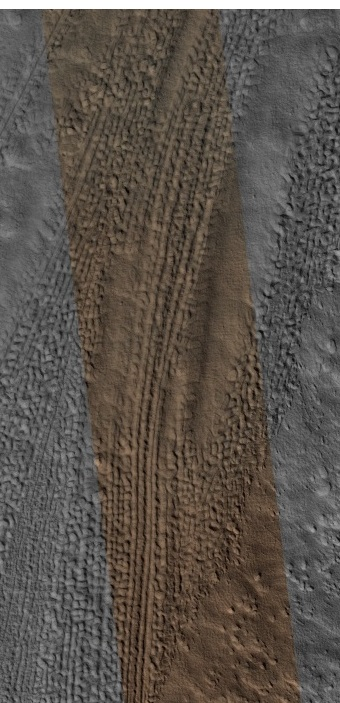
Lineated valley fill in valley, as seen by HiRISE under HiWish program. Linear valley flow is ice covered by debris. Lineated valley fill is generally considered to be an example of a glacier, as it involves the movement of ice.

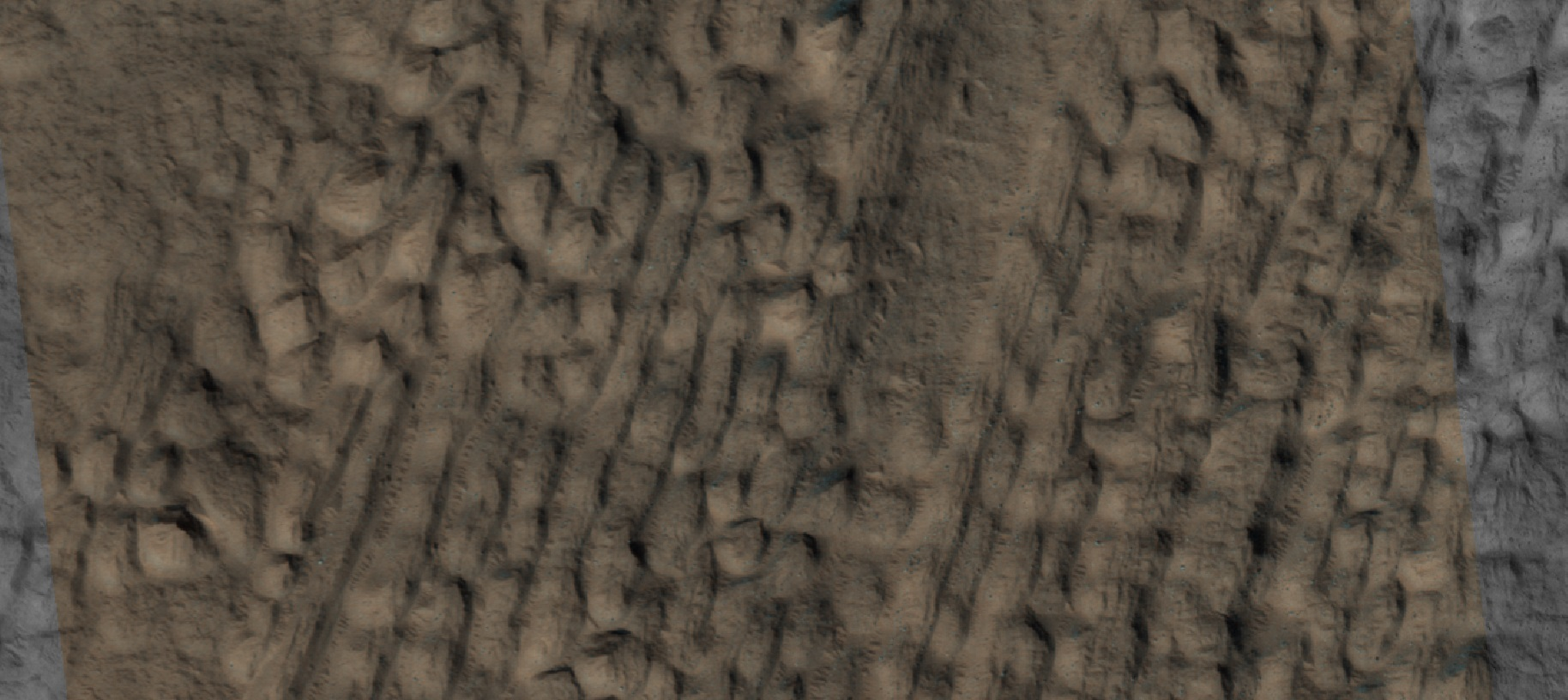
Close view of lineated valley fill (LVF) in valley, as seen by HiRISE under HiWish program. Linear valley flow is ice covered by debris. Picture is about 1 km wide. Lineated valley fill is generally considered to be an example of a glacier, as it involves the movement of ice.

== Concentric crater fill ==
Concentric crater fill, like lobate debris aprons and lineated valley fill, is believed to be ice-rich. Based on accurate topography measures of height at different points in these craters and calculations of how deep the craters should be based on their diameters, it is thought that the craters are 80% filled with mostly ice. That is, they hold hundreds of meters of material that probably consists of ice with a few tens of meters of surface debris. The ice accumulated in the crater from snowfall in previous climates. Recent modeling suggests that concentric crater fill develops over many cycles in which snow is deposited, then moves into the crater. Once inside the crater, shade and dust preserve the snow. The snow changes to ice. The many concentric lines are created by the many cycles of snow accumulation. Generally snow accumulates whenever the axial tilt reaches 35 degrees.

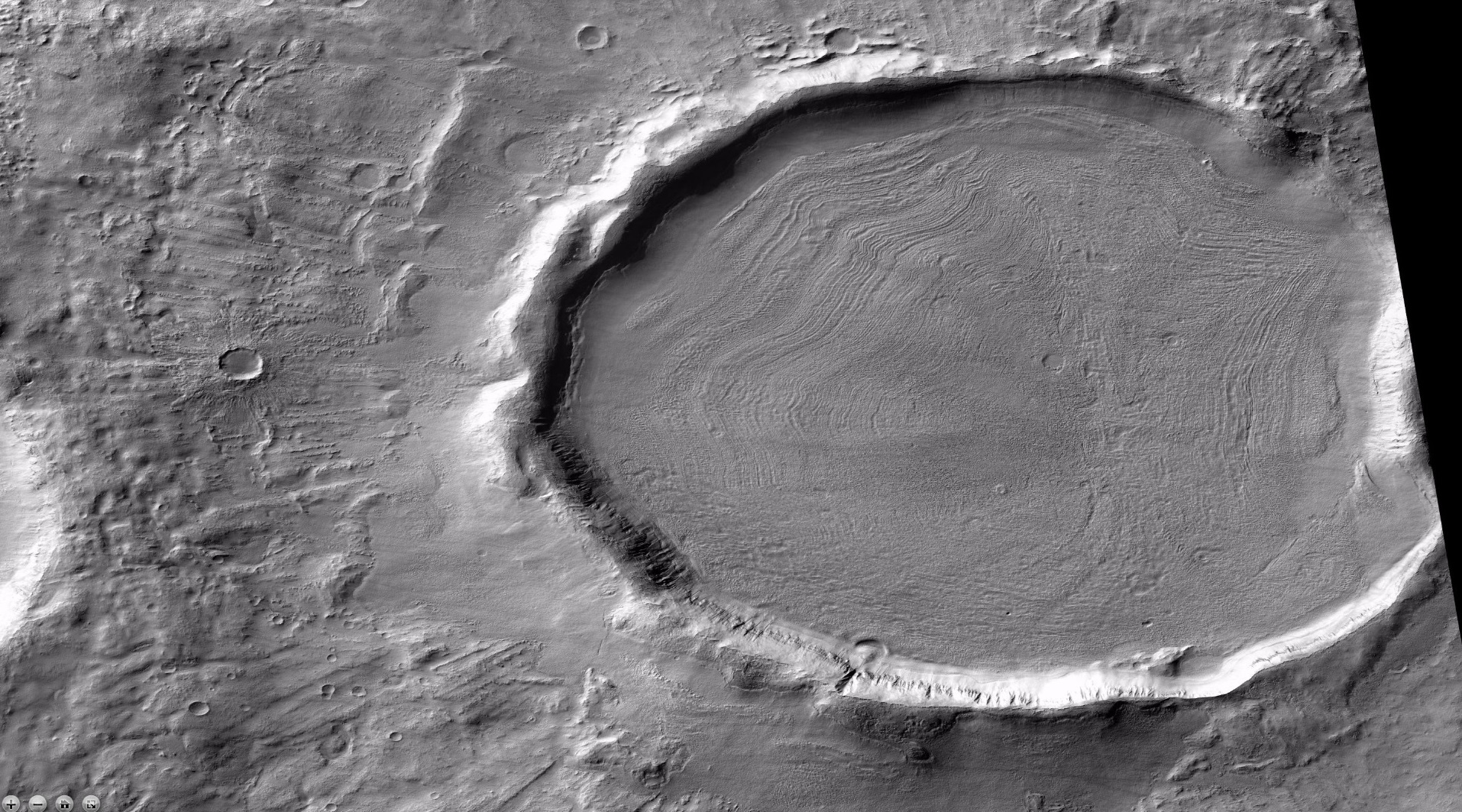
Crater showing concentric crater fill, as seen by CTX (on Mars Reconnaissance Orbiter). Location is Phaethontis quadrangle.

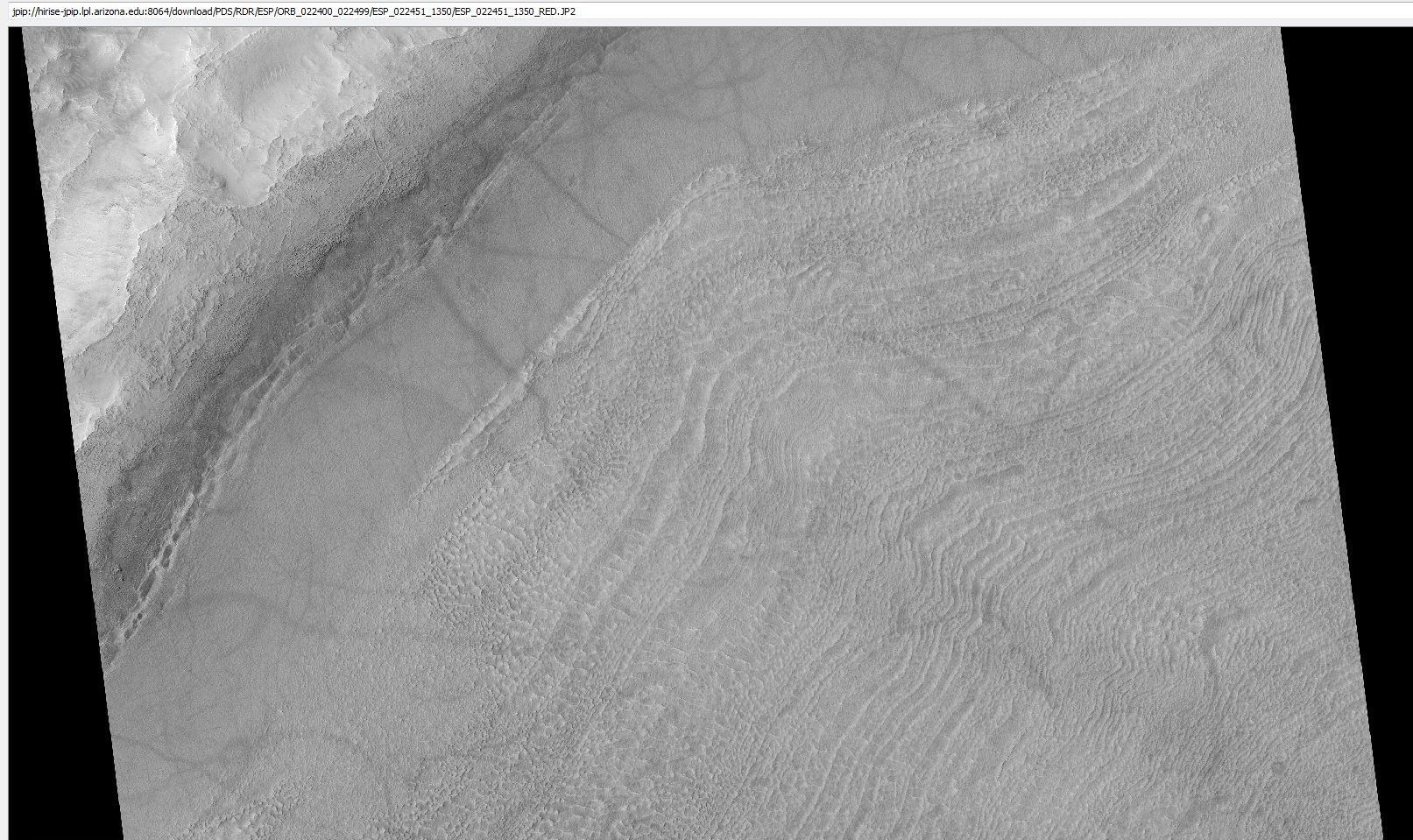
Close-up view of concentric crater fill, as seen by HiRISE under HiWish program Note: this is an enlargement of previous image of a concentric crater. Location is Phaethontis quadrangle.

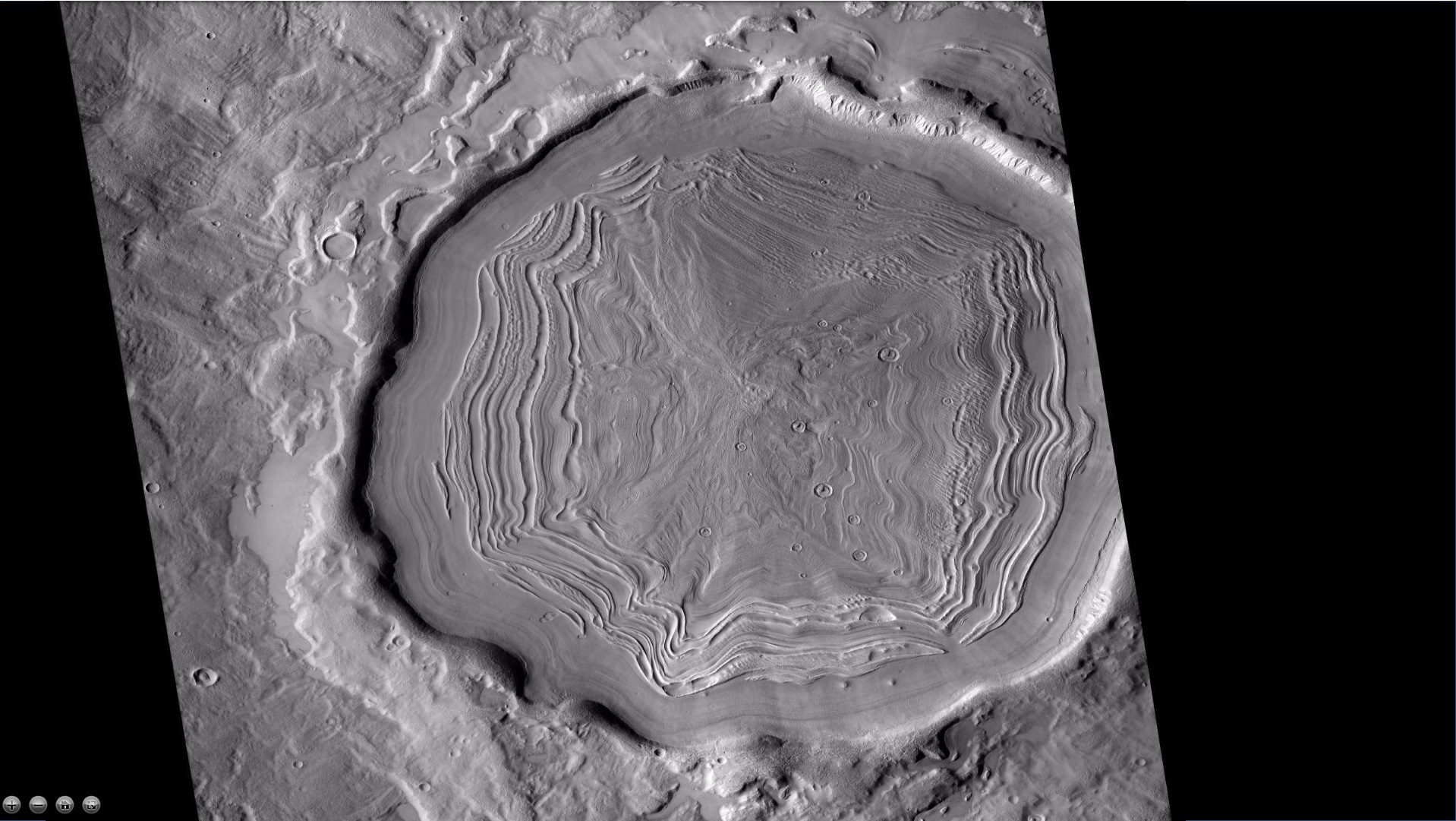
Crater with concentric crater fill, as seen by CTX (on Mars Reconnaissance Orbiter). Location is Casius quadrangle.

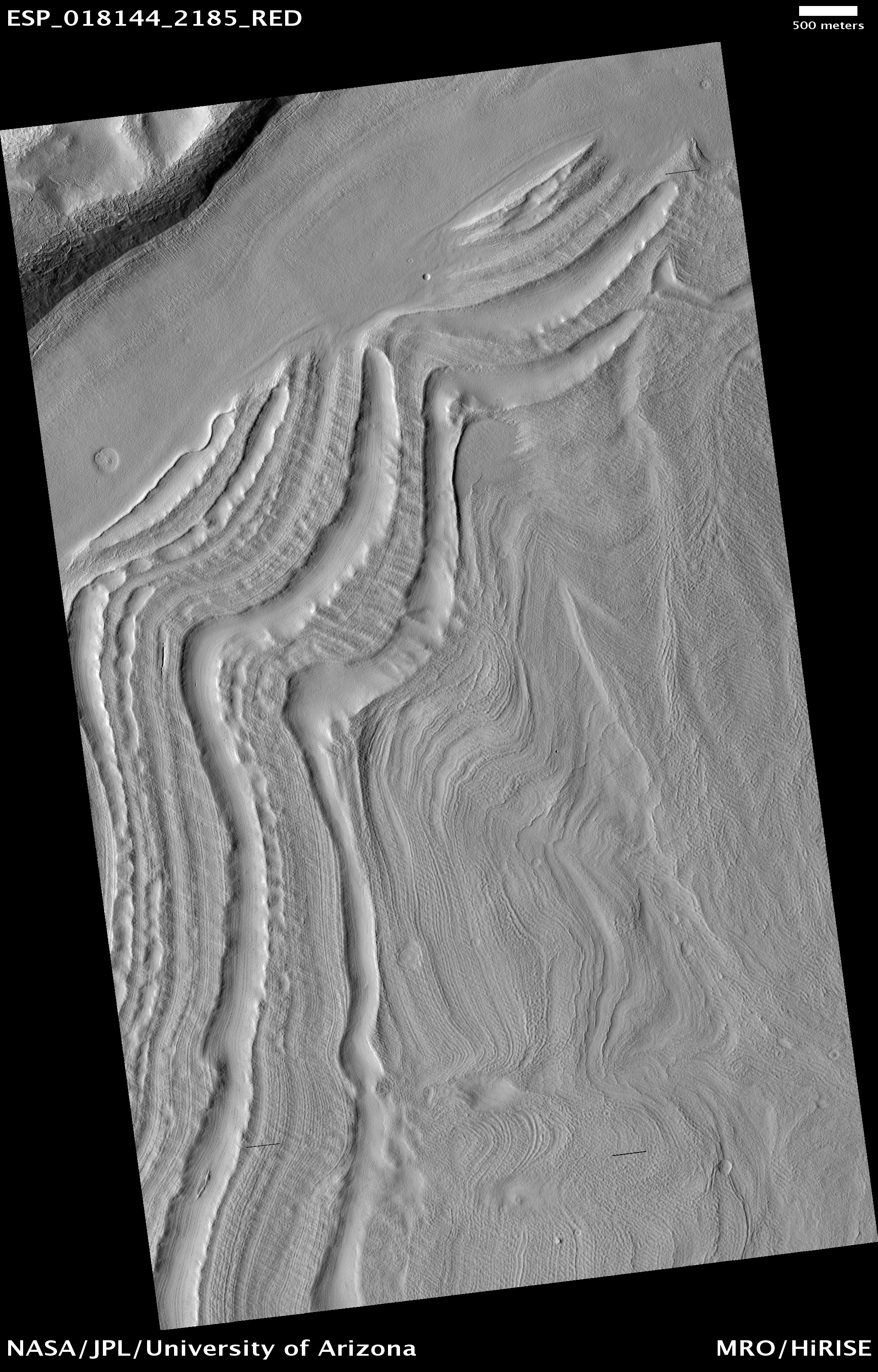
Well-developed hollows, as seen by HiRISE under the HiWish program. Location is the Casius quadrangle. Note: this is an enlargement of the previous image that was taken by CTX.

== Mesas ==
Mesas are common on the Earth and on Mars. They represent landscapes that covered a wide area. They are what is left after erosion has taken away most of the material. They have a "cap rock" on the top which keeps erosion from working on underlying layers. Monument Valley is a location on the Earth that people often visit to see these features.

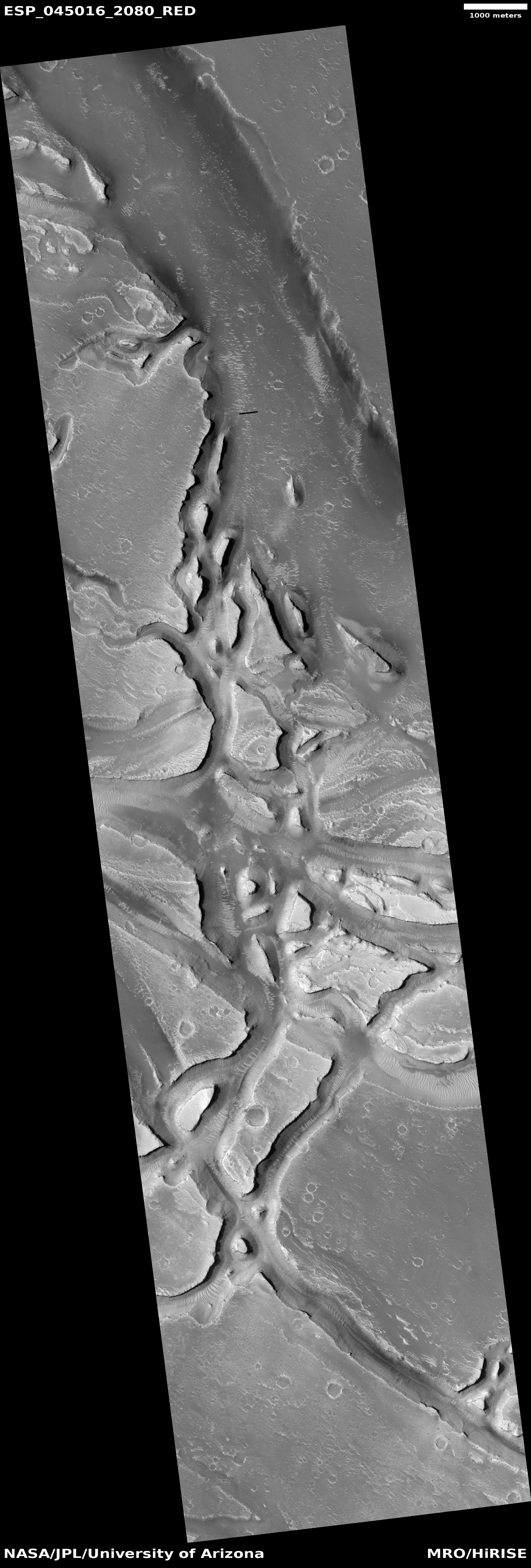
Wide view of Buttes and Mesas, as seen by HiRISE under HiWish program Location is Elysium quadrangle.

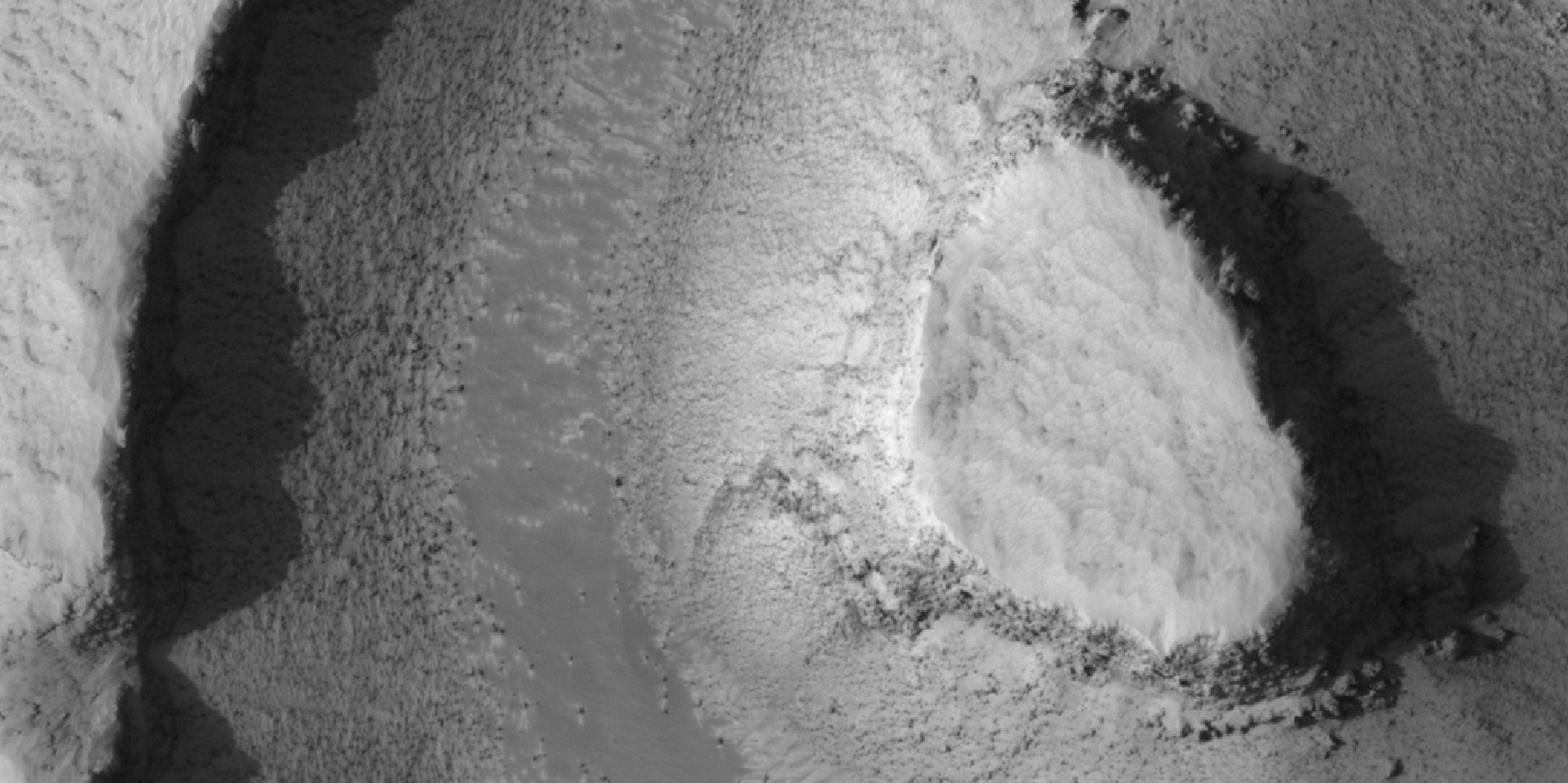
Buttes and mesas, as seen by HiRISE under HiWish program Note: this is an enlargement of the previous image.

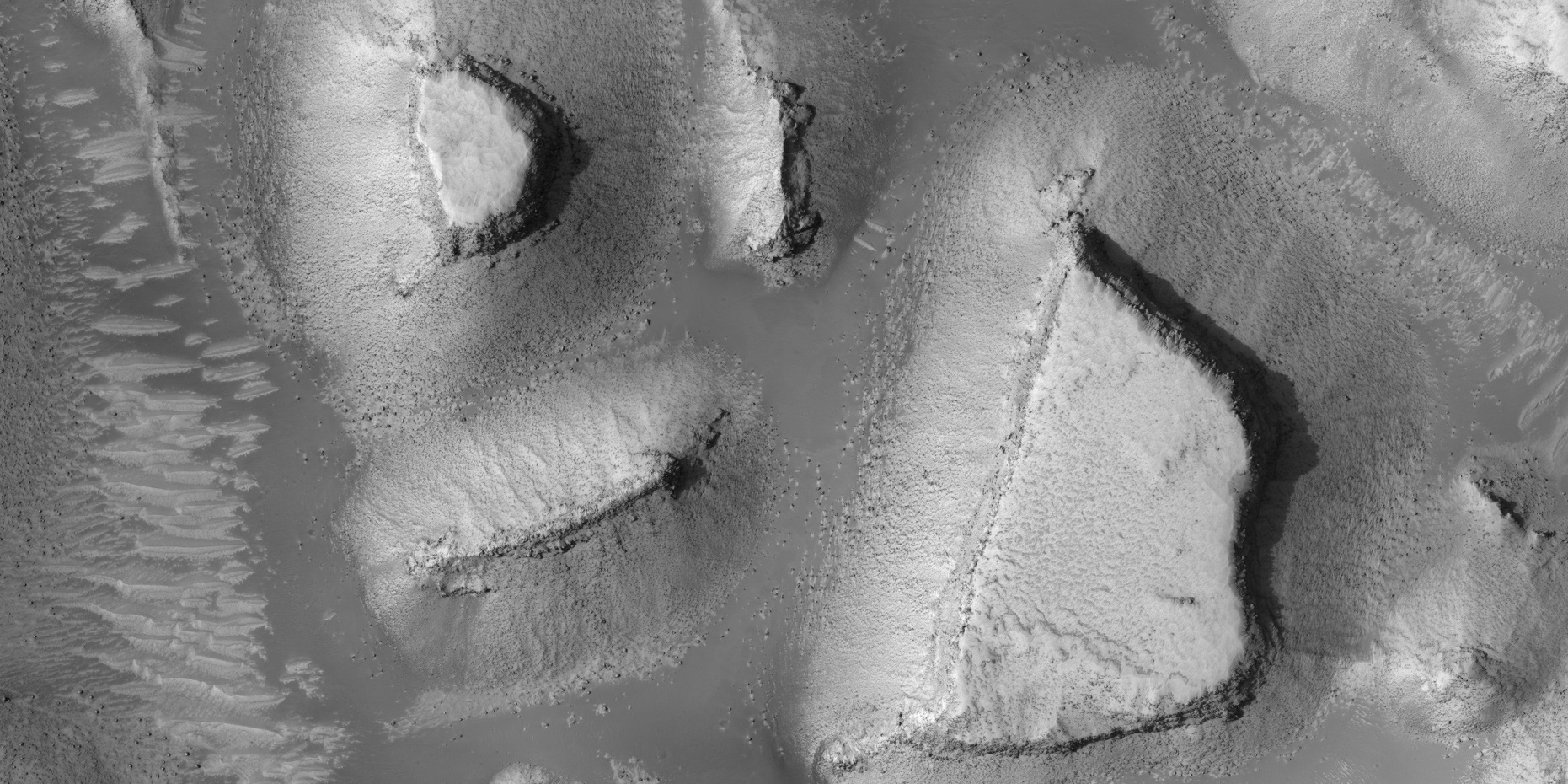
Mesas, as seen by HiRISE under HiWish program Note: this is an enlargement of a previous image.
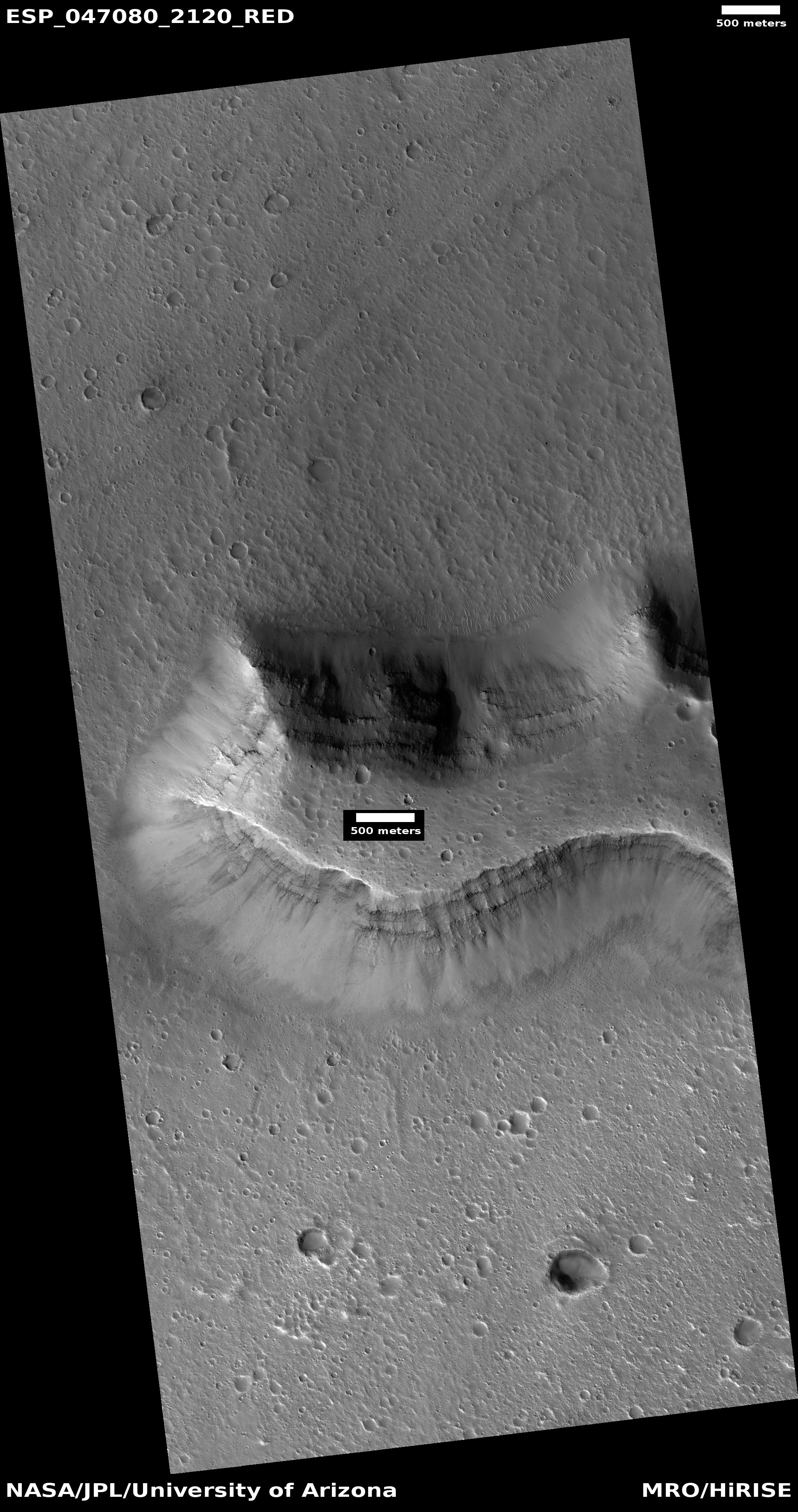
Layers in mesa, as seen by HiRISE under HiWish program Location is Mare Acidalium quadrangle.

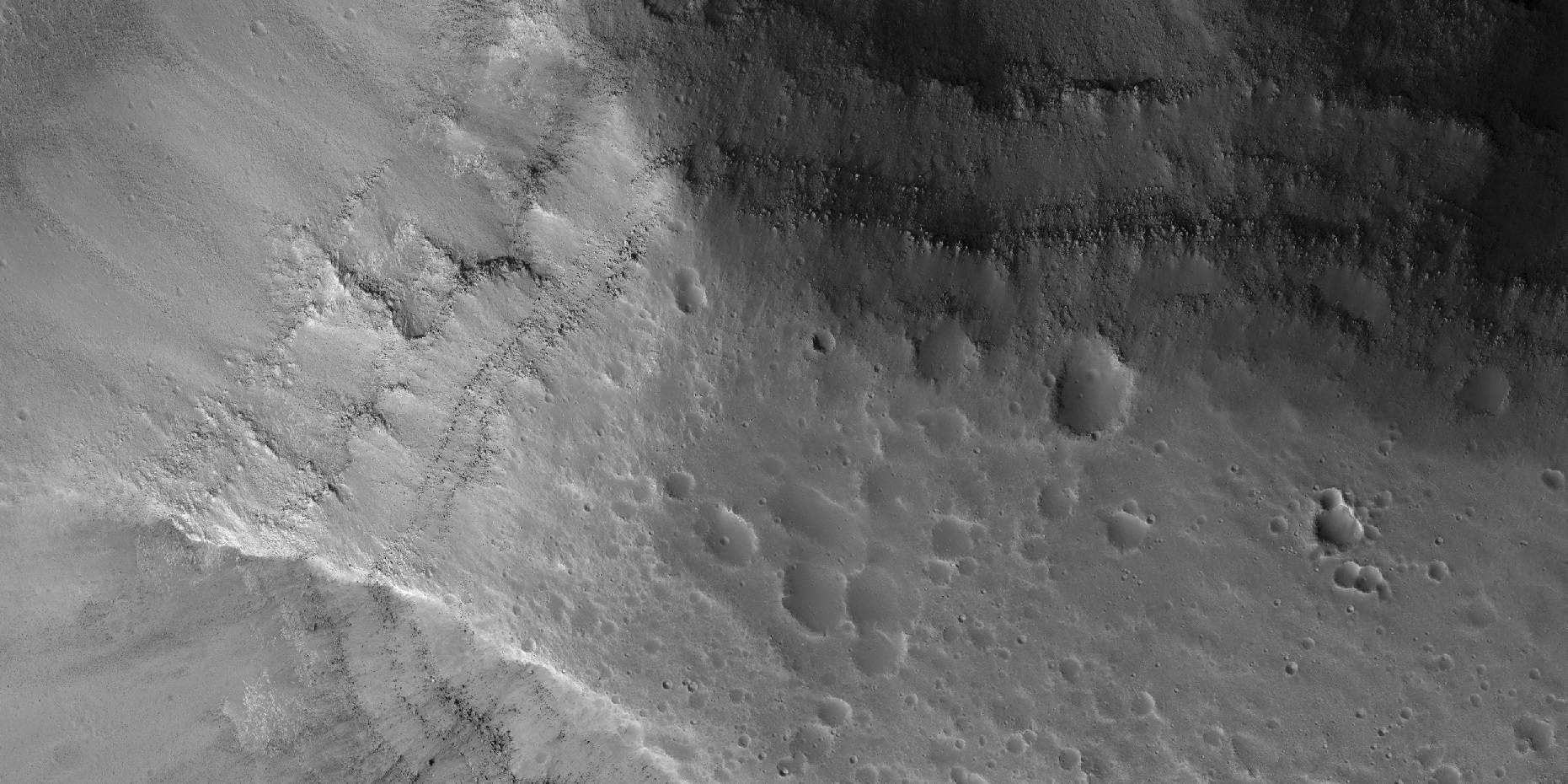
Close view of layers in mesa, as seen by HiRISE under HiWish program
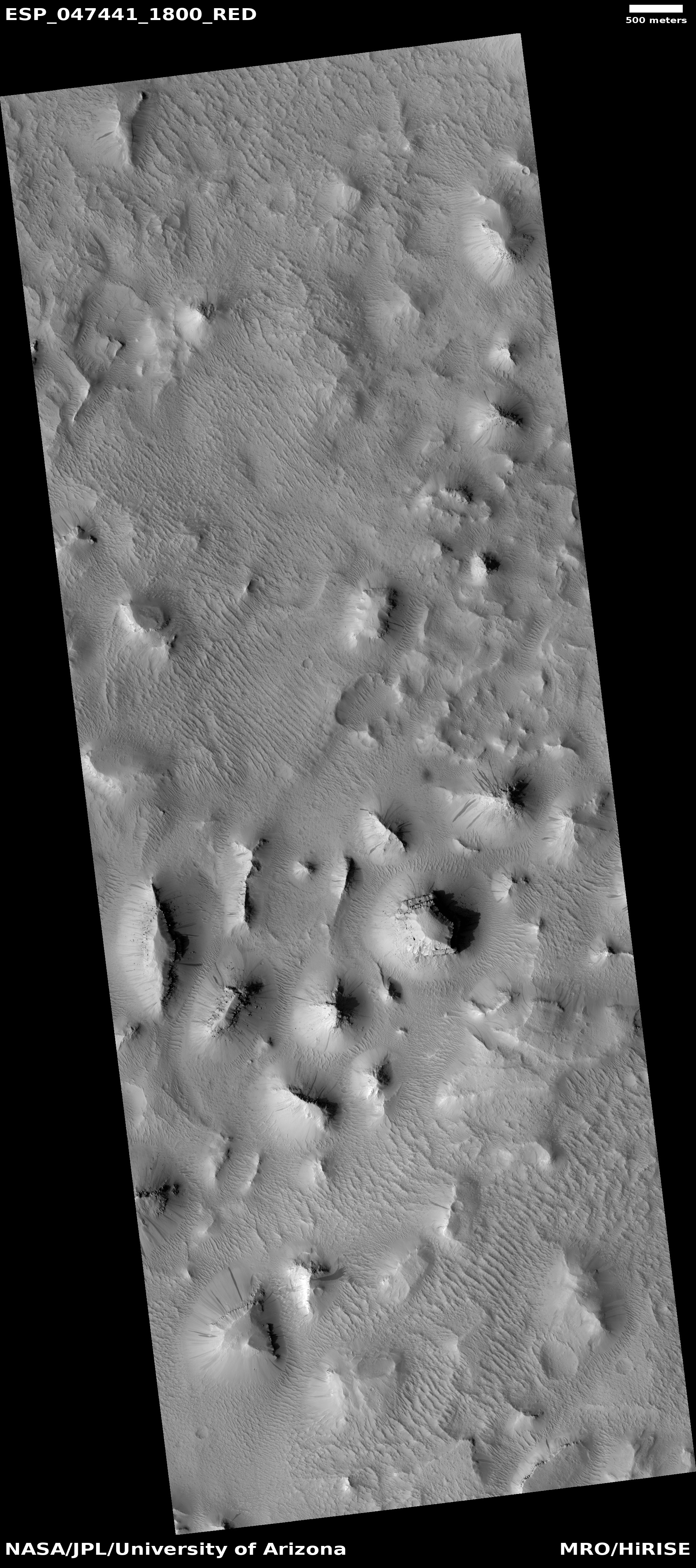
Wide view of layered buttes and small mesas, as seen by HiRISE under HiWish program Some dark slope streaks are visible. Location is Aeolis quadrangle. Note: Parts of this image are enlarged in next three pictures.

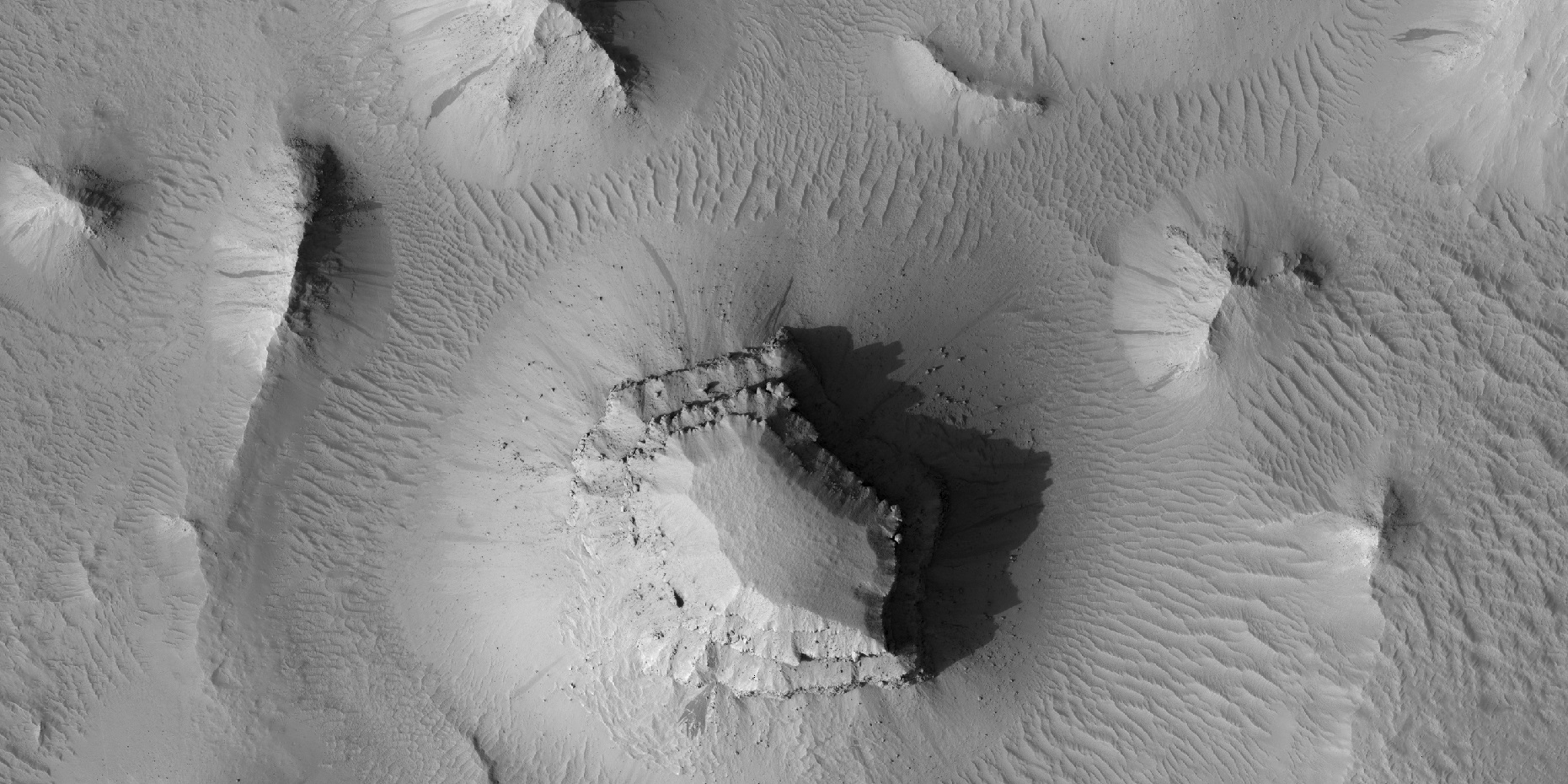
Layered mesa and mounds with dark slope streaks, as seen by HiRISE under HiWish program

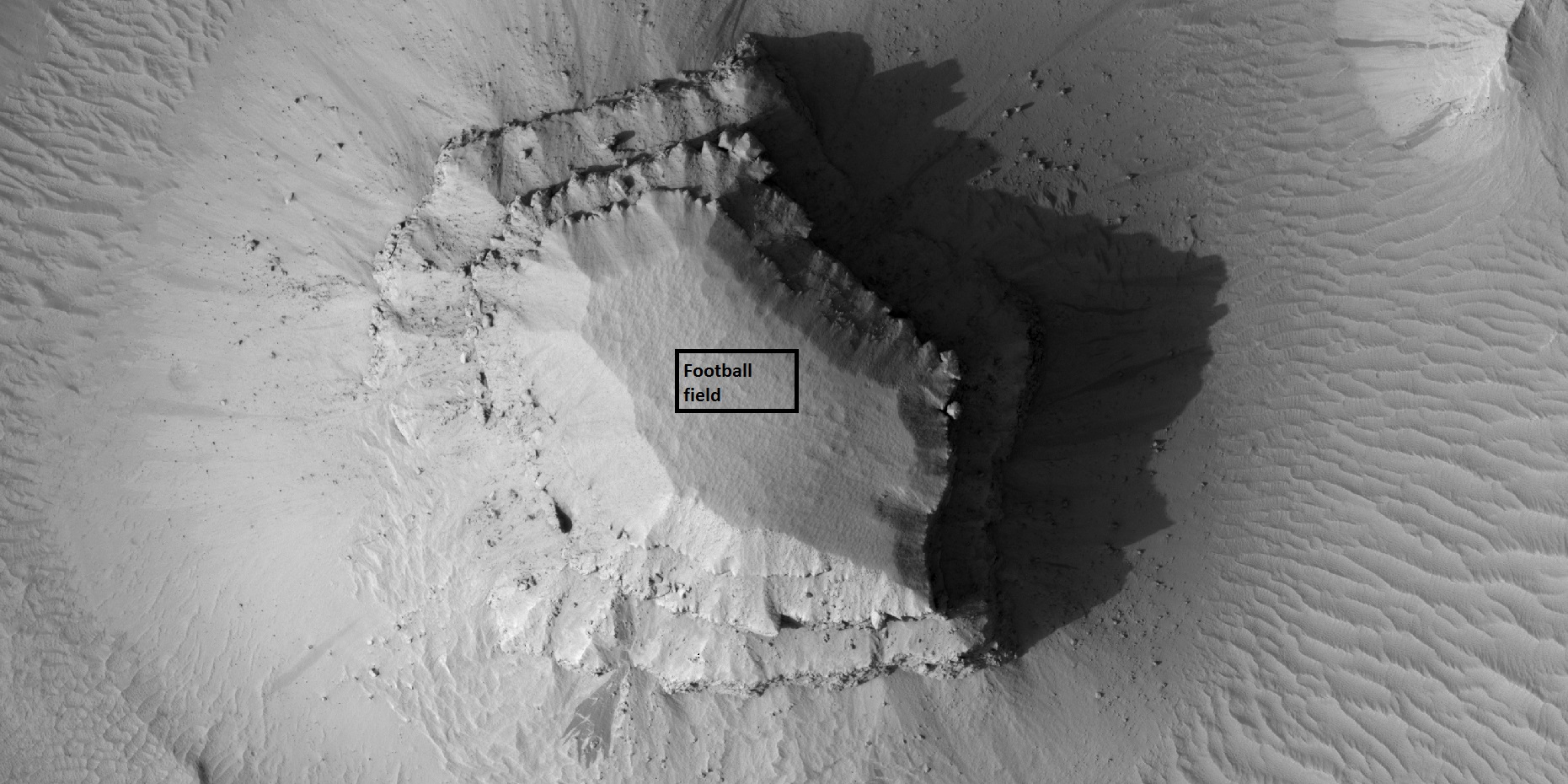
Close view of layered small mesa with dark slope streak, as seen by HiRISE under HiWish program Box shows the size of a football field.

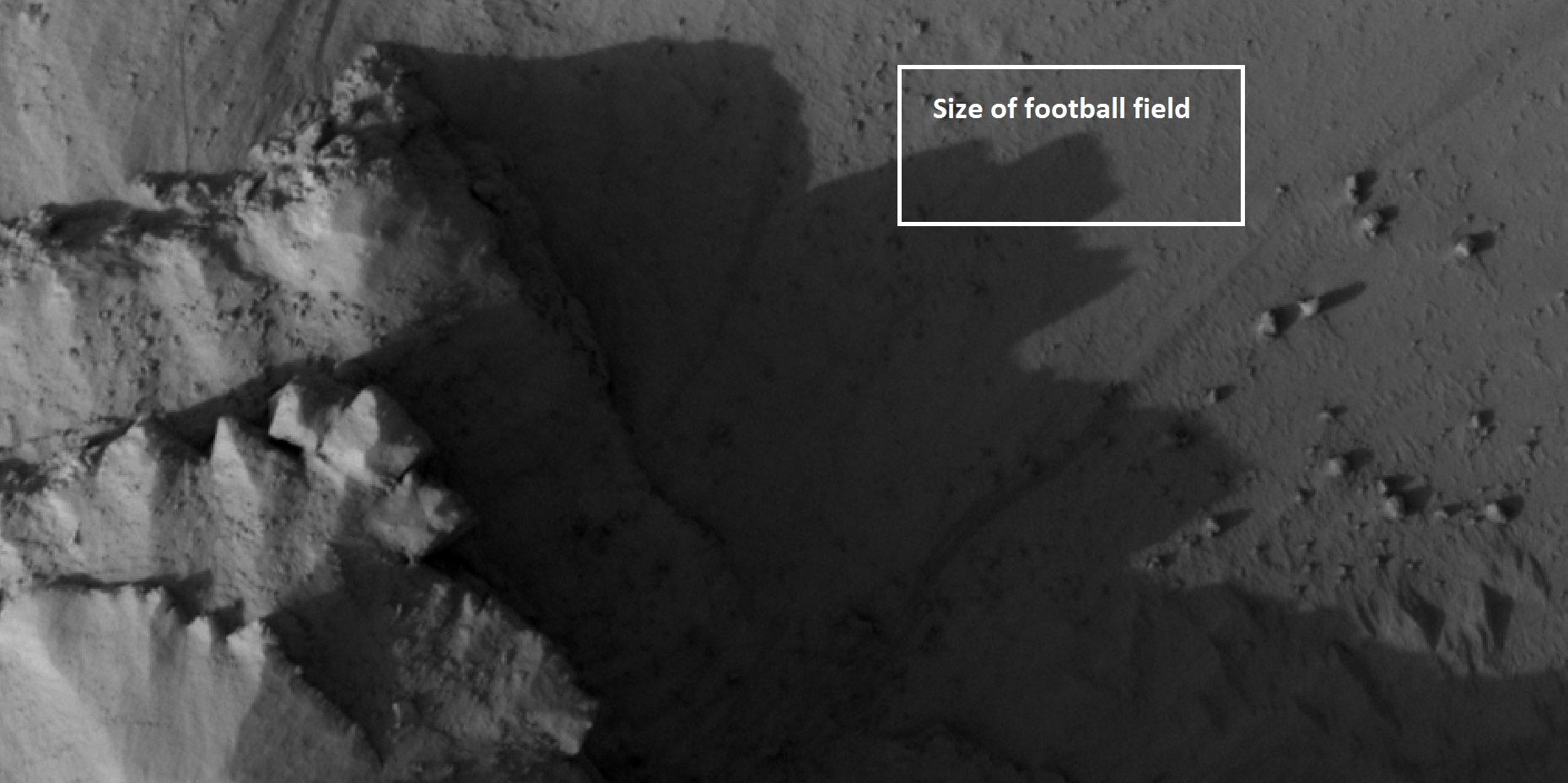
Very close view of individual blocks breaking off layer in a butte, as seen by HiRISE under HiWish program Blocks have angular shapes. Box shows size of football field.

== Chaos terrain ==
Chaos terrain is believed to be associated with the release of huge amounts of water. The chaotic features may have collapsed when water came out of the surface. Martian outflow channels commonly begin with a Chaos region. A chaotic region can be recognized by a tangle of mesas, buttes, and hills, all chopped through with valleys which in places look almost patterned. Some parts of this chaotic area have not collapsed completely—they are still formed into large mesas, so they may still contain water ice. Chaotic terrain occurs in numerous locations on Mars, and always gives the strong impression that something abruptly disturbed the ground. Chaos regions formed long ago. By counting craters (more craters in any given area means an older surface) and by studying the valleys' relations with other geological features, scientists have concluded the channels formed 2.0 to 3.8 billion years ago.

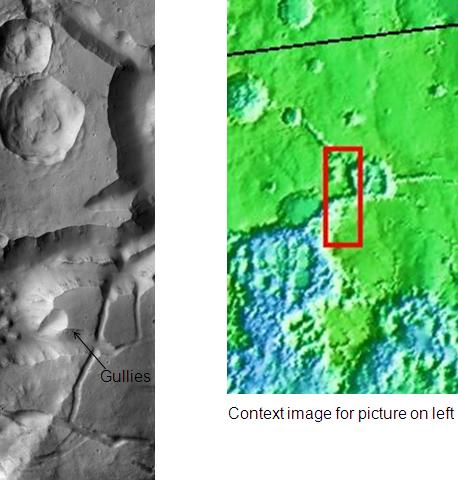
Huge canyons in Aureum Chaos, as seen by THEMIS. Gullies are rare at this latitude. Image from Margaritifer Sinus quadrangle.

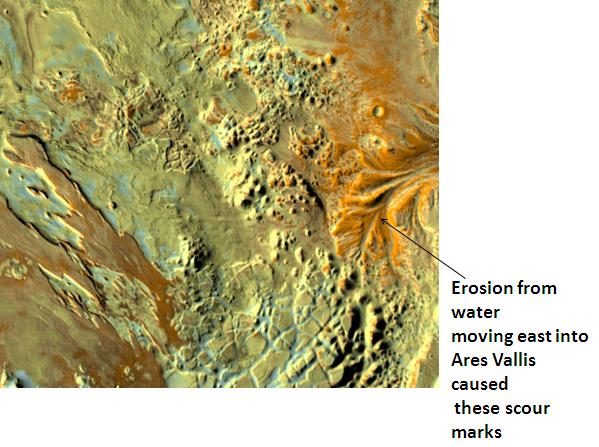
Erosion in Aram Chaos, as seen by THEMIS. Image in Oxia Palus quadrangle.

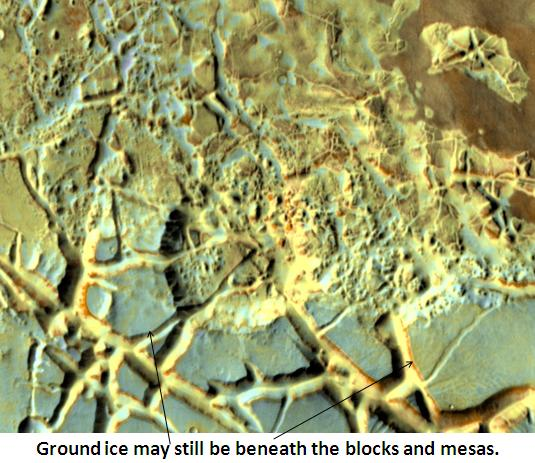
Blocks in Aram showing possible source of water, as seen by THEMIS. Image in Oxia Palus quadrangle.

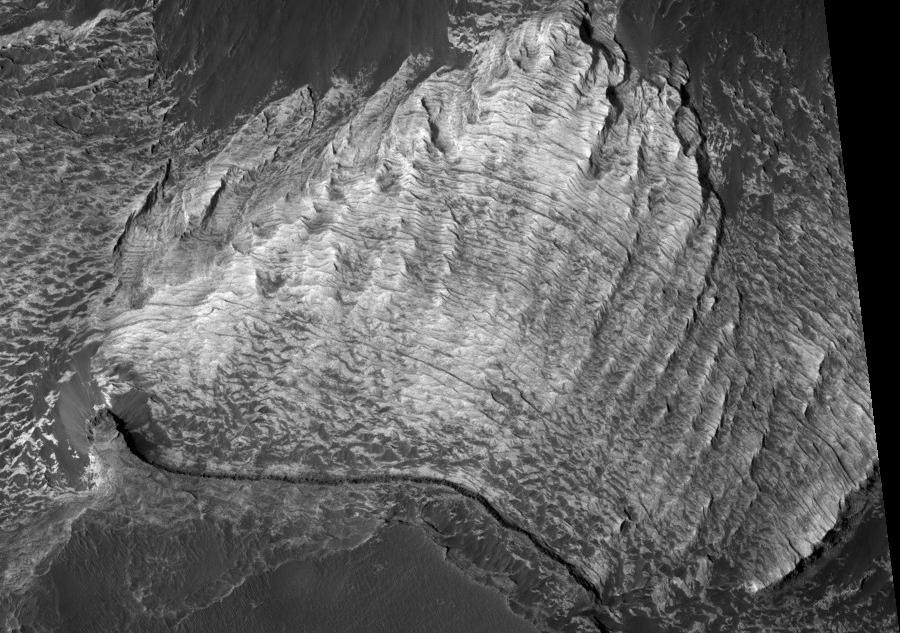
Light colored layers in Eos Chaos, as seen by HiRISE.

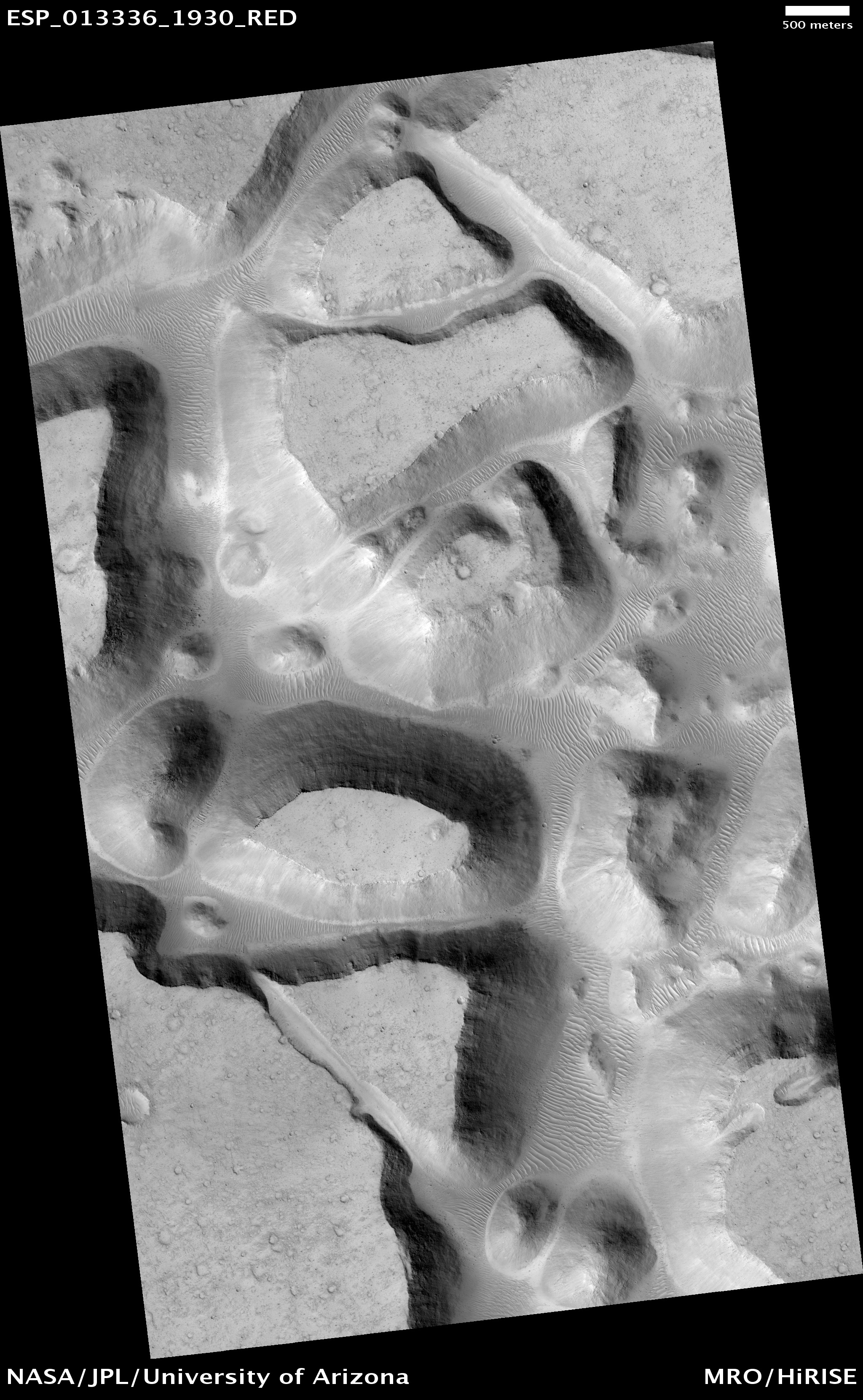
Ister Chaos, as seen by HiRISE.

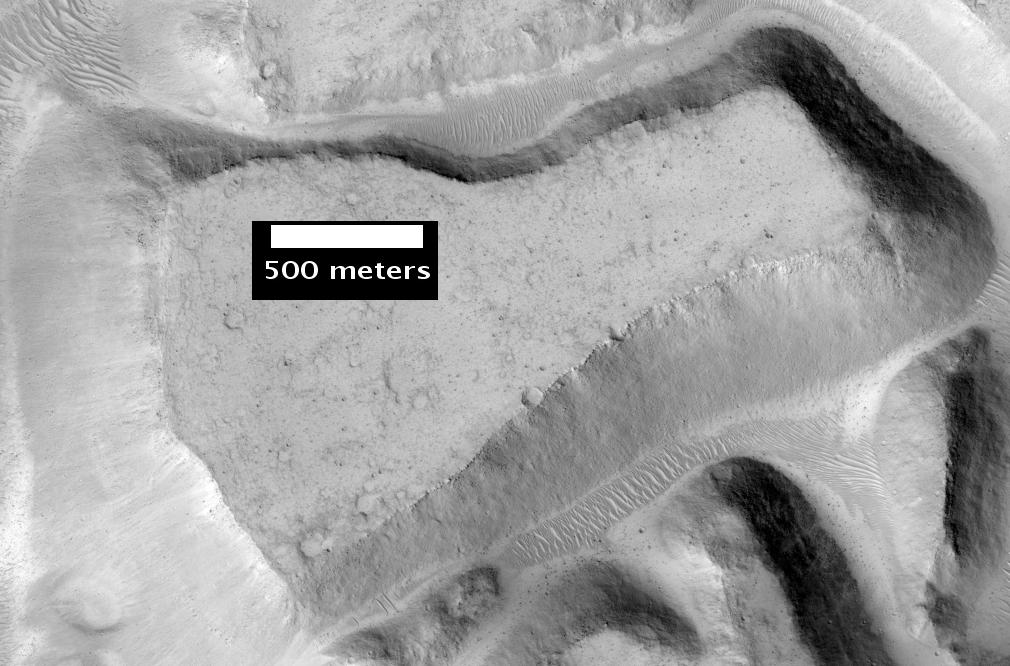
Close-up of Ister Chaos, as seen by HiRISE.
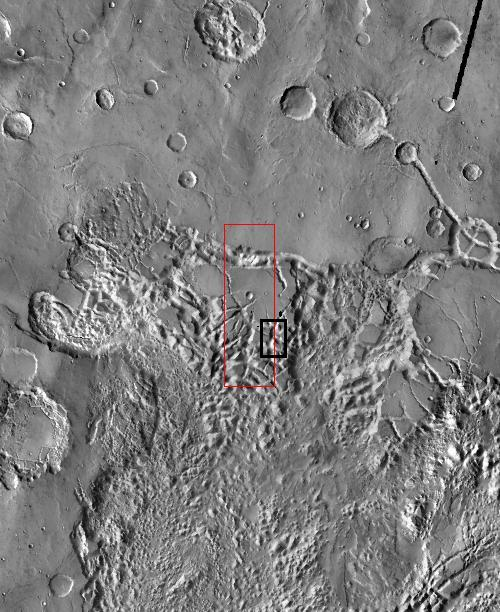
THEMIS image of wide view of following HiRISE images. Black box shows approximate location of HiRISE images. This image is just a part of the vast area known as Aureum Chaos. Click on image to see more details.

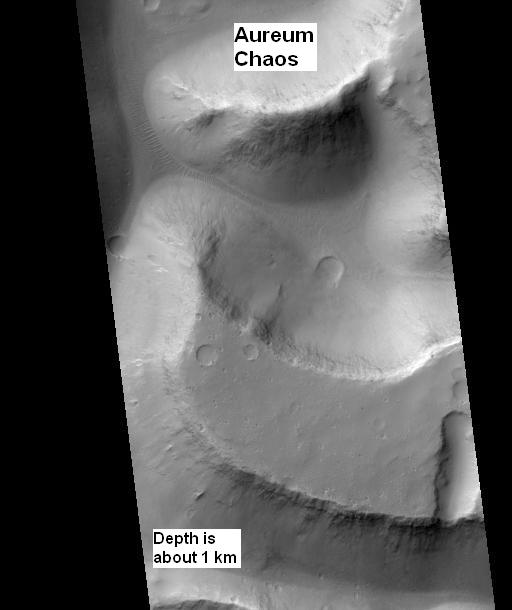
Aureum Chaos, as seen by HiRISE, under the HiWish program.

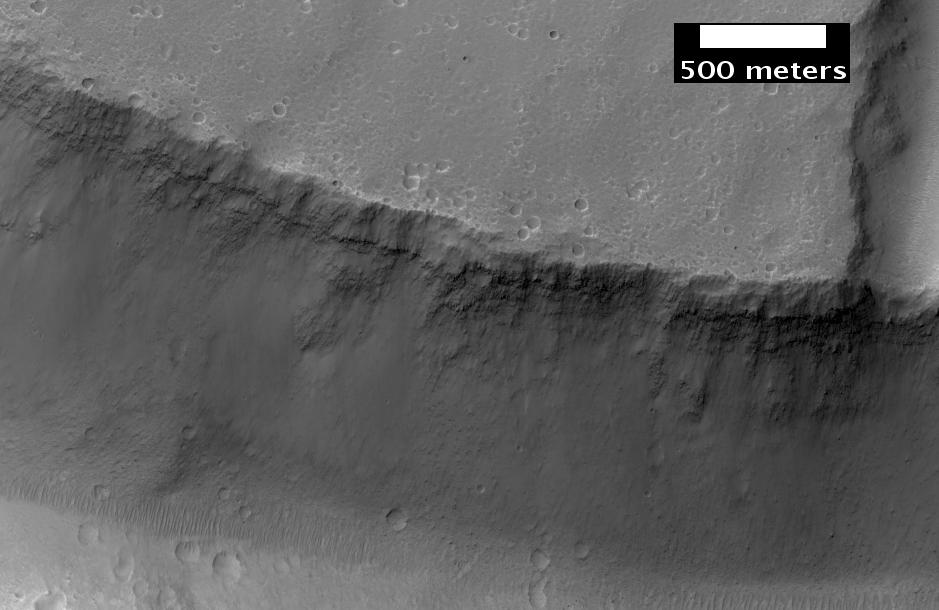
Close up view of previous image, as seen by HiRISE under HiWish program. Small round dots are boulders.
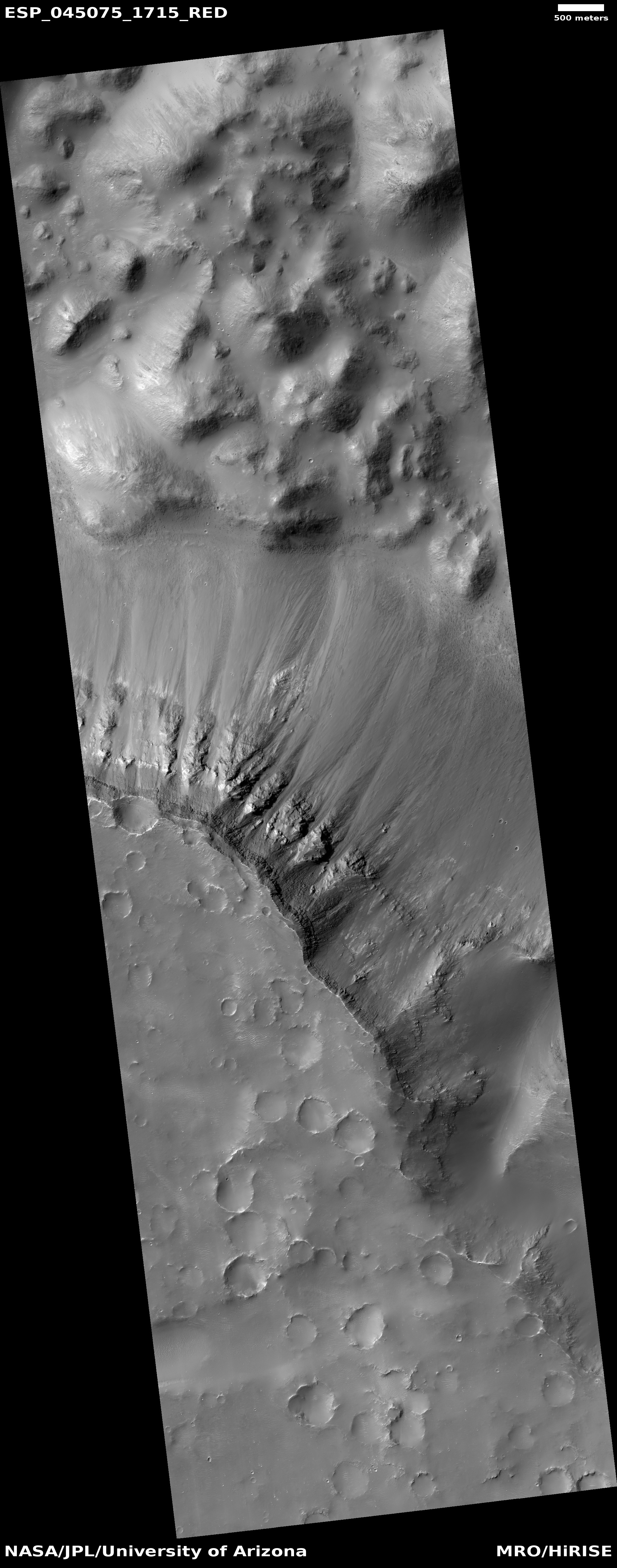
Wide view of layers in wall of Aurorae Chaos, as seen by HiRISE under HiWish program

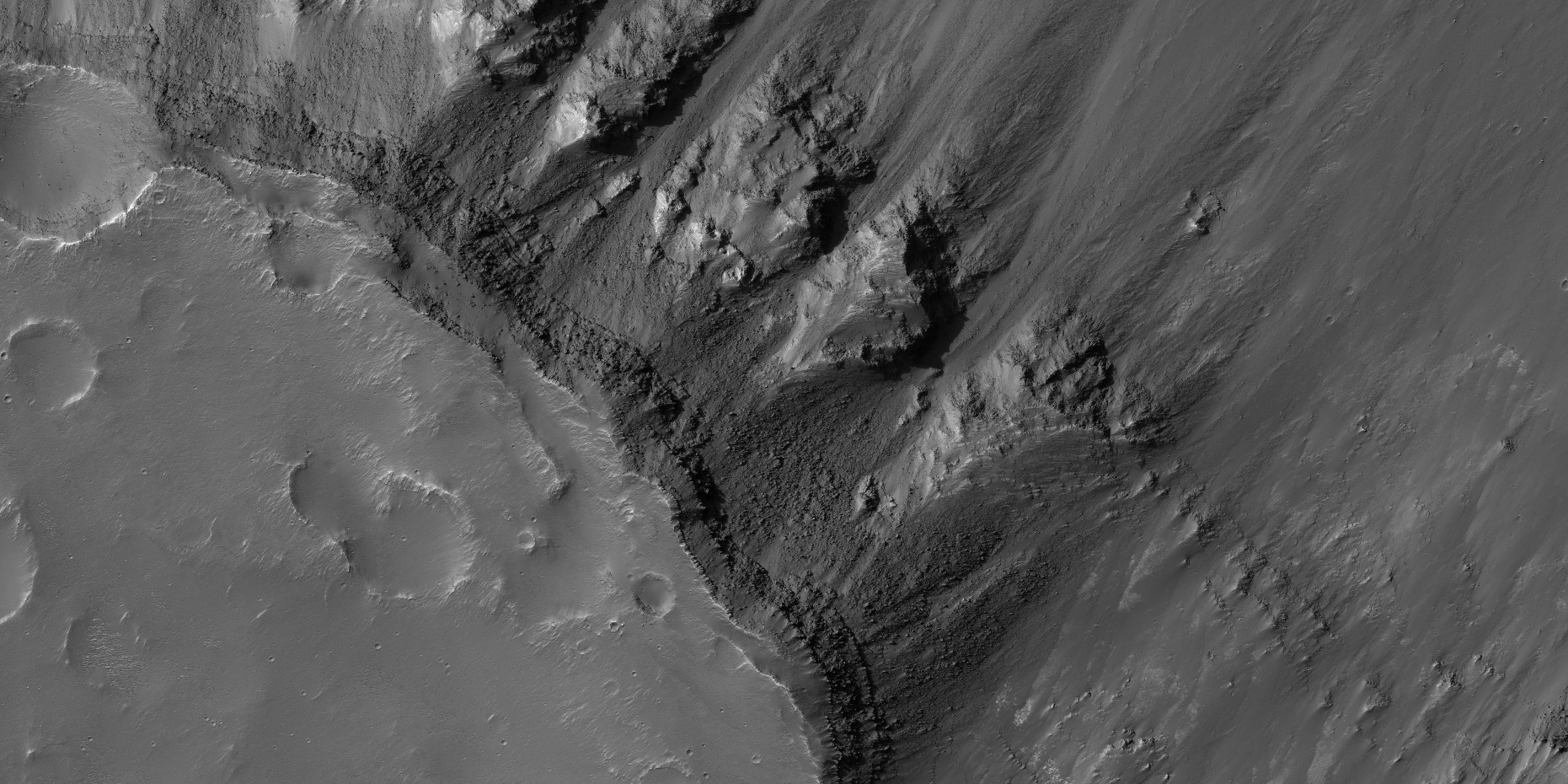
Close view of layers from previous image, as seen by HiRISE under HiWish program

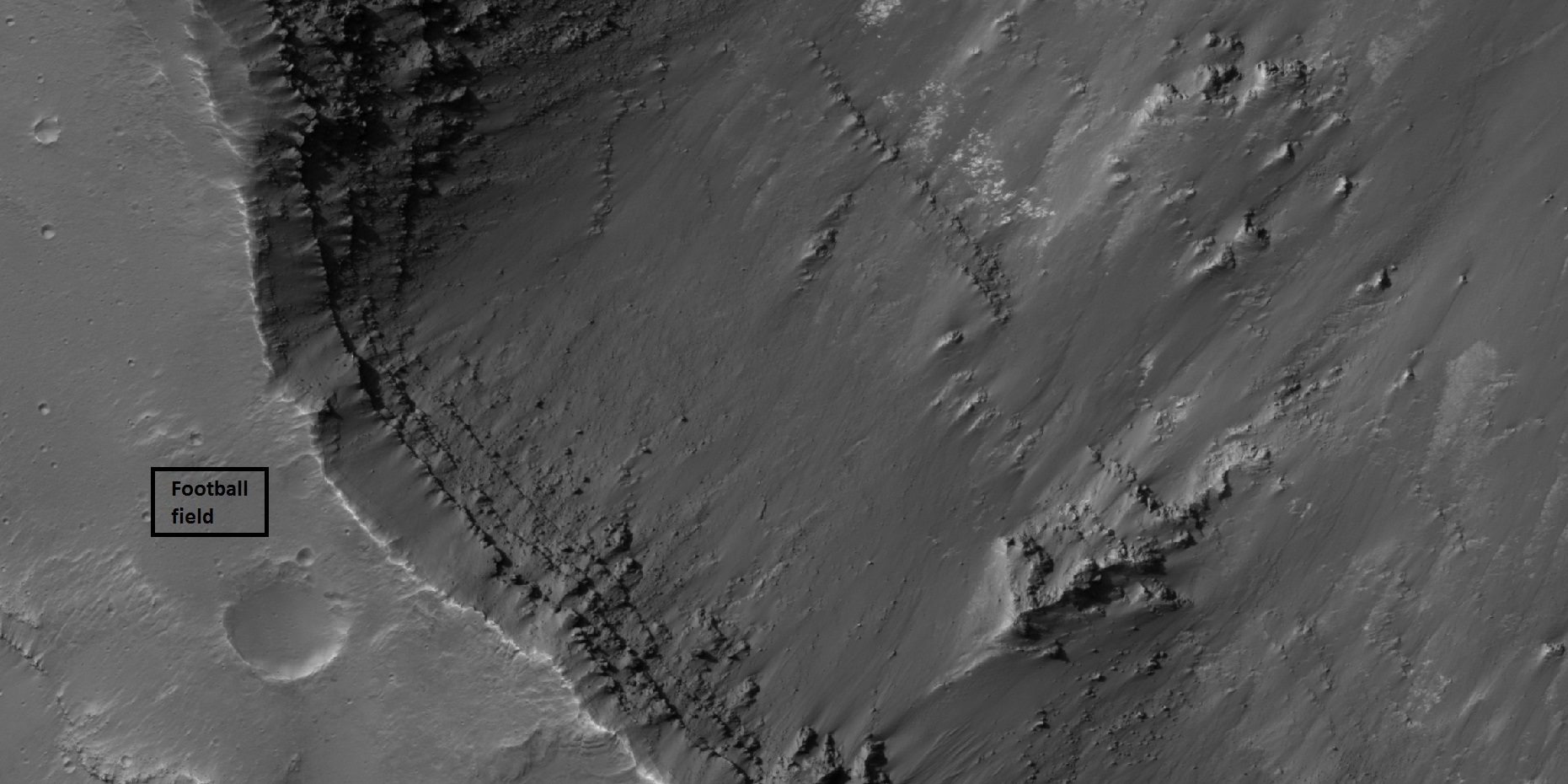
Close view of layers from a previous image, as seen by HiRISE under HiWish program Box shows the size of football field.

== Upper plains unit ==
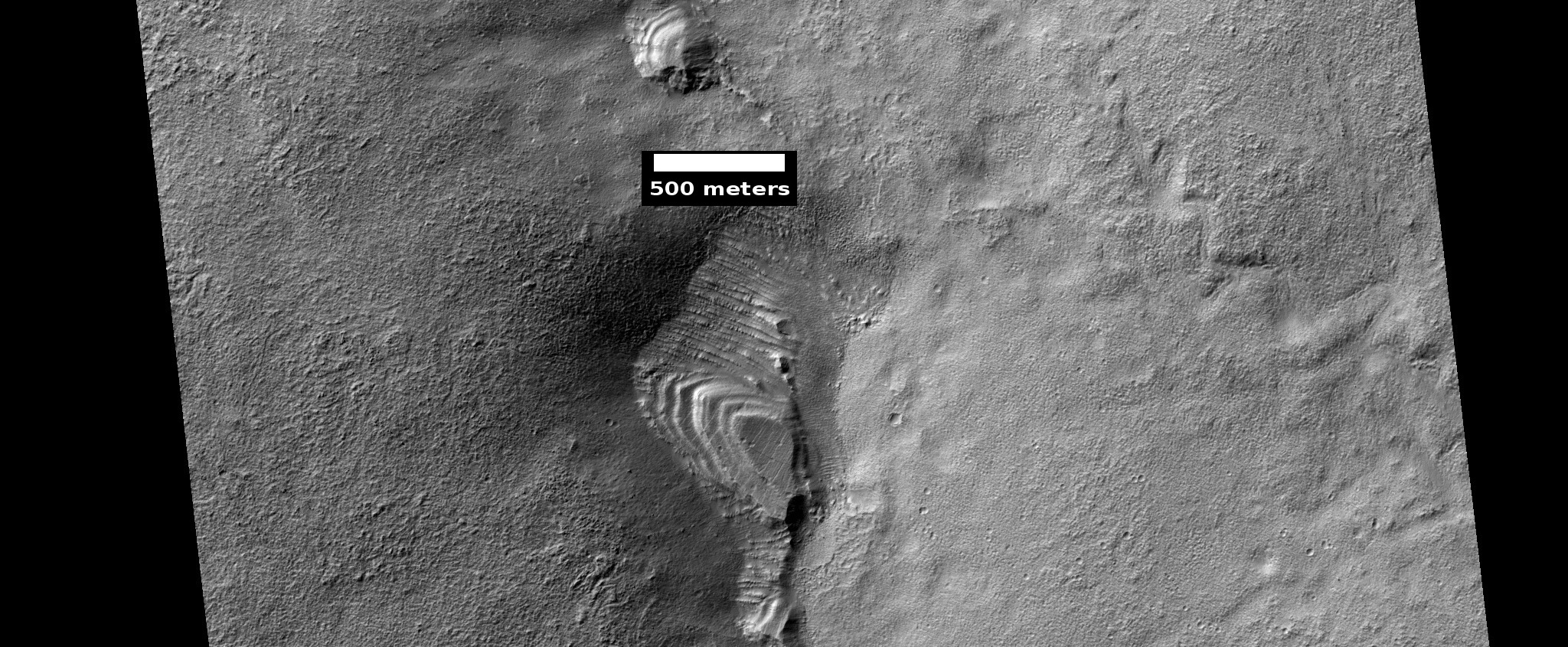
Layered feature probably formed by the erosion of the upper plains unit, as seen by HiRISE under HiWish program.

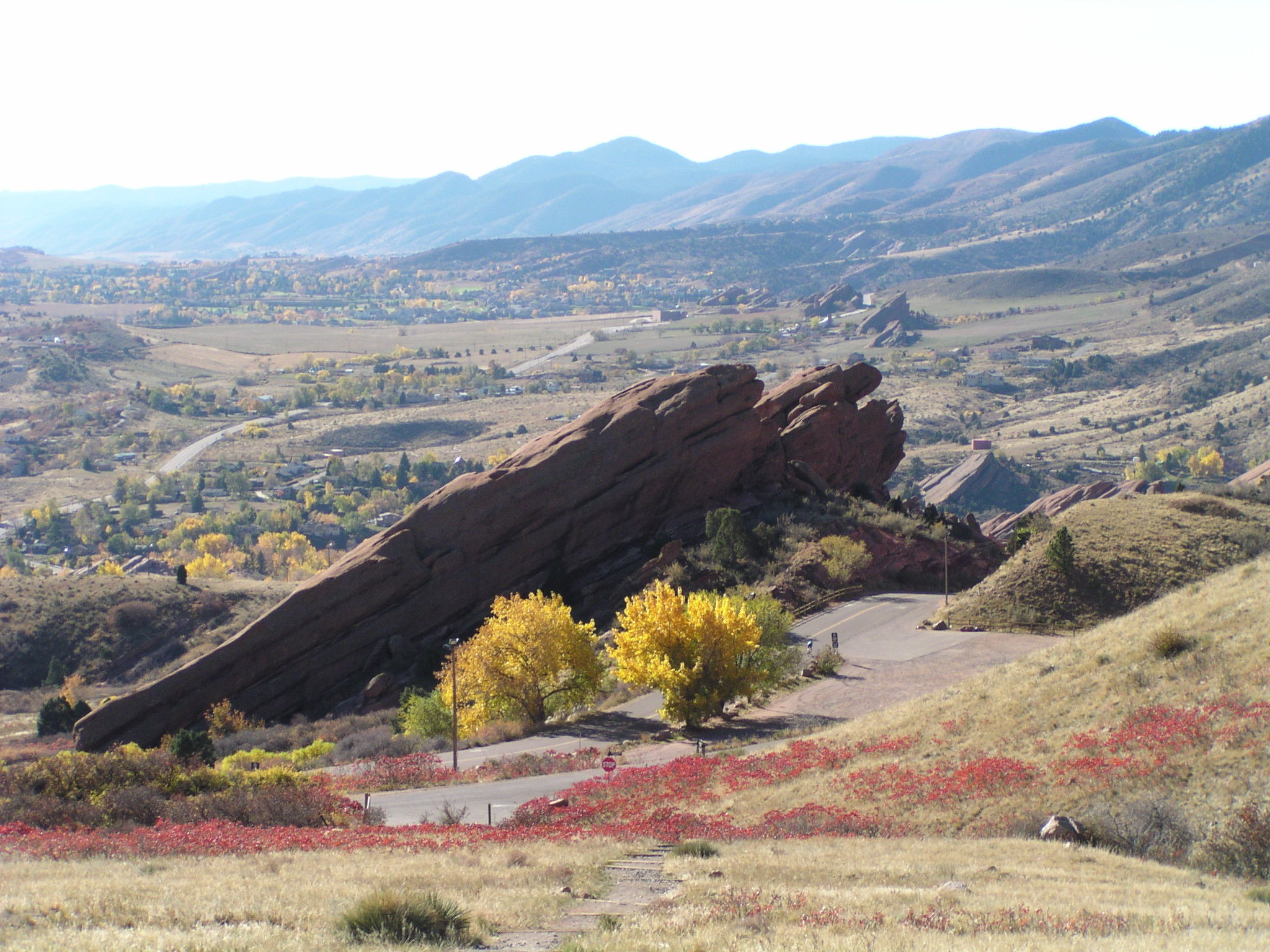
Layered feature in Red Rocks Park, Colorado. This has a different origin than ones on Mars, but it has a similar shape. Features in Red Rocks region were caused by uplift of mountains. Red Rocks park is famous for all the concerts that are held there.
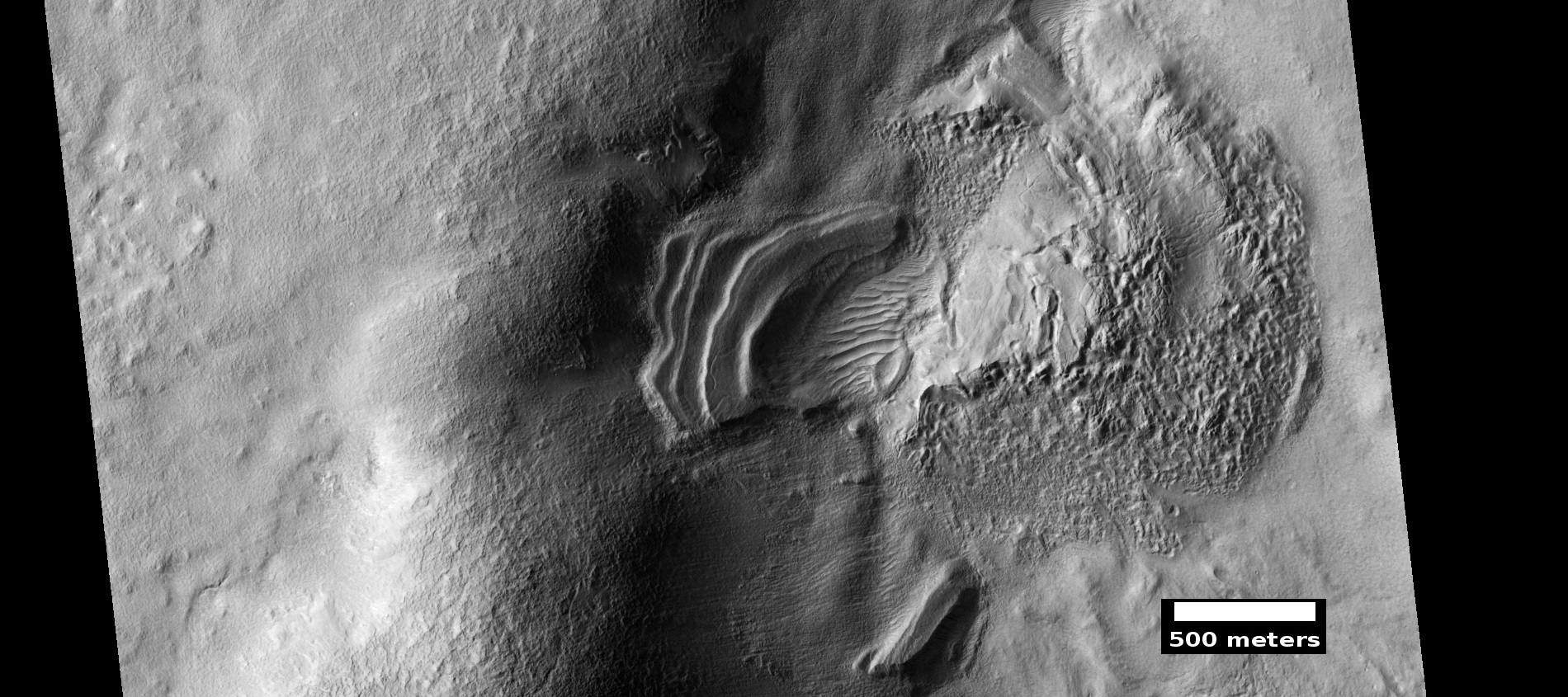
Layered feature that is probably the remains of a once widespread unit that fell from the sky, as seen by HiRISE under the HiWish program. Dipping layers are common in some regions of Mars. They may be the remains of mantle layers. Another idea for their origin was presented at 55th LPSC (2024) by an international team of researchers. They suggest that the layers are from past ice sheets.

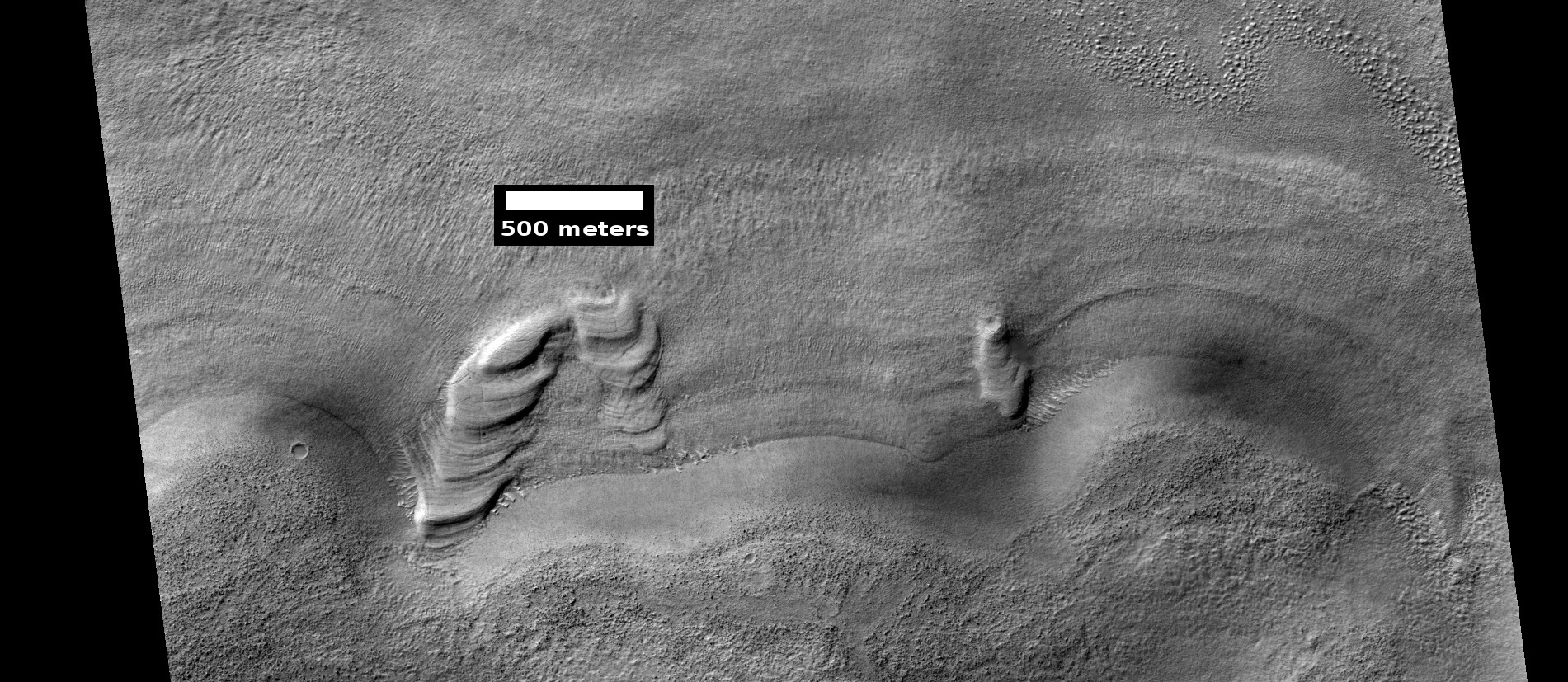
Layered feature, as seen by HiRISE under the HiWish program

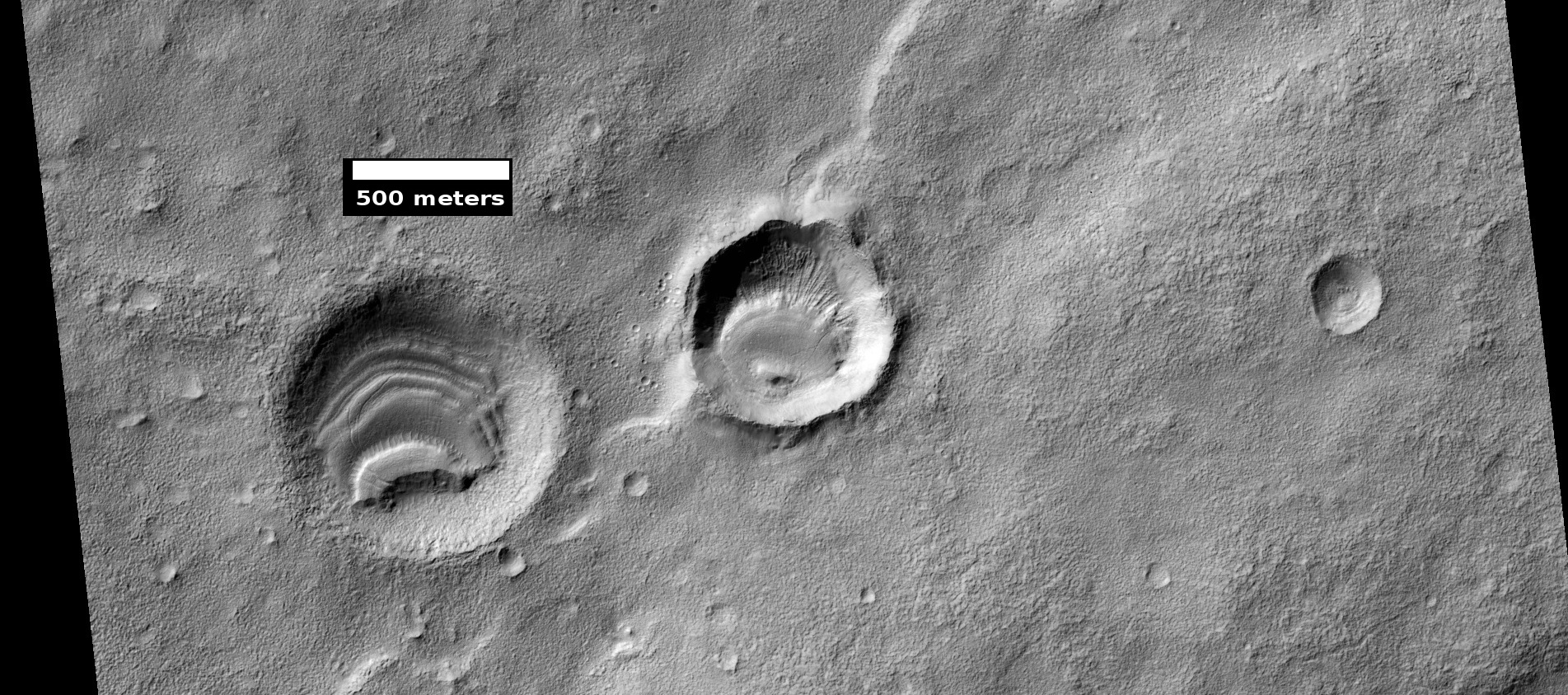
Layered feature in crater, as seen by HiRISE under the HiWish program

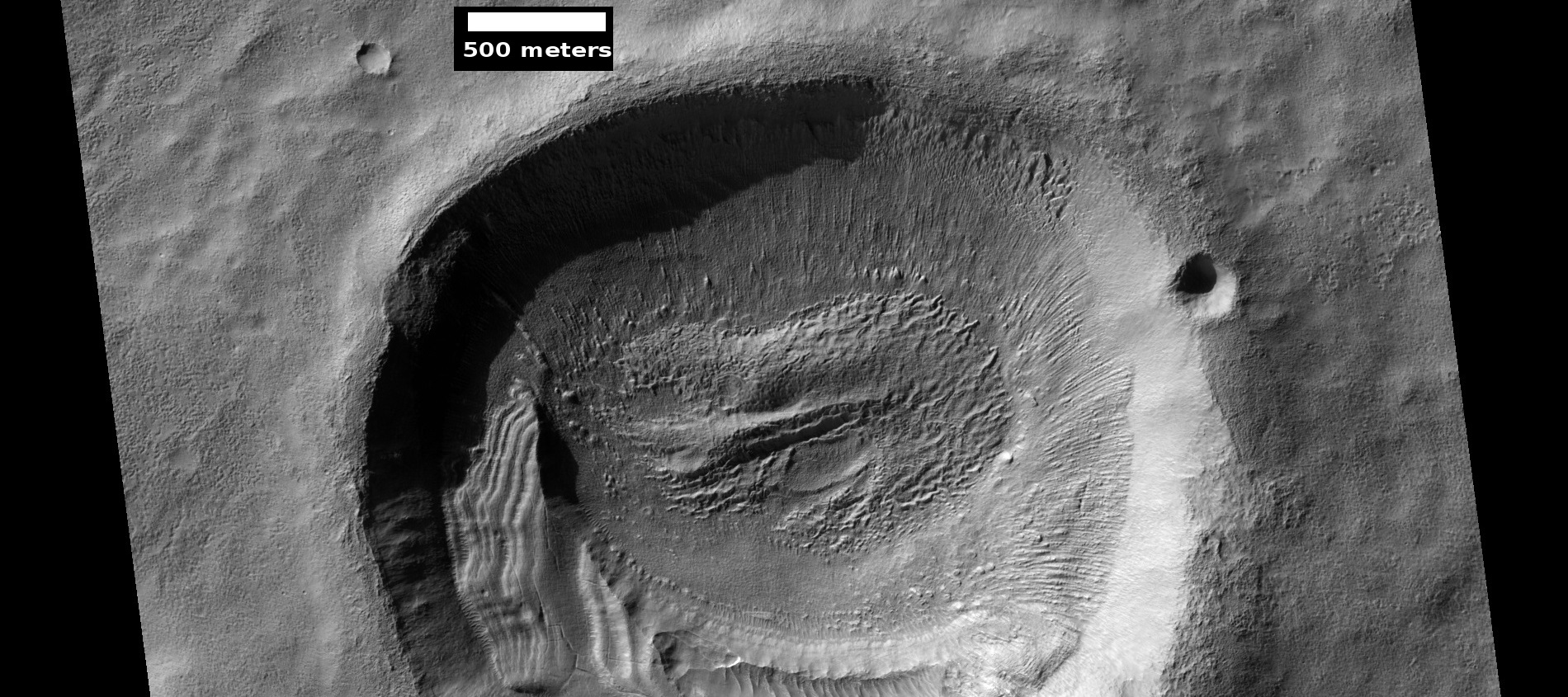
Layered feature in crater, as seen by HiRISE under the HiWish program These features were described by a group of scientists at a conference in Texas. https://www.hou.usra.edu/meetings/lpsc2025/pdf/1938.pdf Blanc. E., et al. 2025. DIPPING LAYERED DEPOSITS ON MARS: IMPLICATIONS FOR CLIMATE-DRIVEN MIDLATITUDE PROCESSES.

Remnants of a 50–100 meter thick mantling, called the upper plains unit, has been discovered in the mid-latitudes of Mars. First investigated in the Deuteronilus Mensae region, but it occurs in other places as well. The remnants consist of sets of dipping layers in craters and along mesas. Sets of dipping layers may be of various sizes and shapes—some look like Aztec pyramids from Central America. Another idea for their origin was presented at 55th LPSC (2024) by an international team of researchers. They suggest that the layers are from past ice sheets.

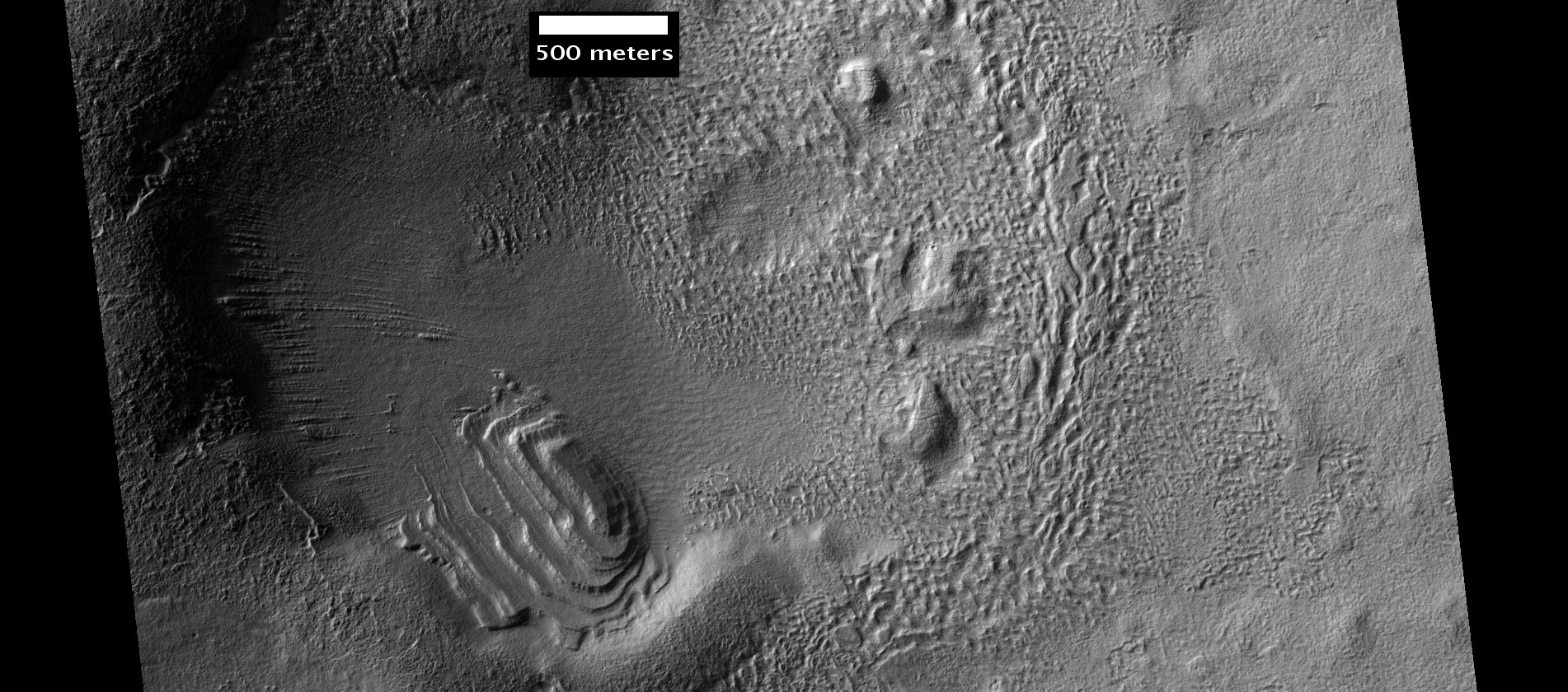
Layered structure in crater that is probably what is left of a layered unit that once covered a much larger area. Material for this unit fell from the sky as ice-coated dust. The picture was taken by HiRISE, under the HiWish program.

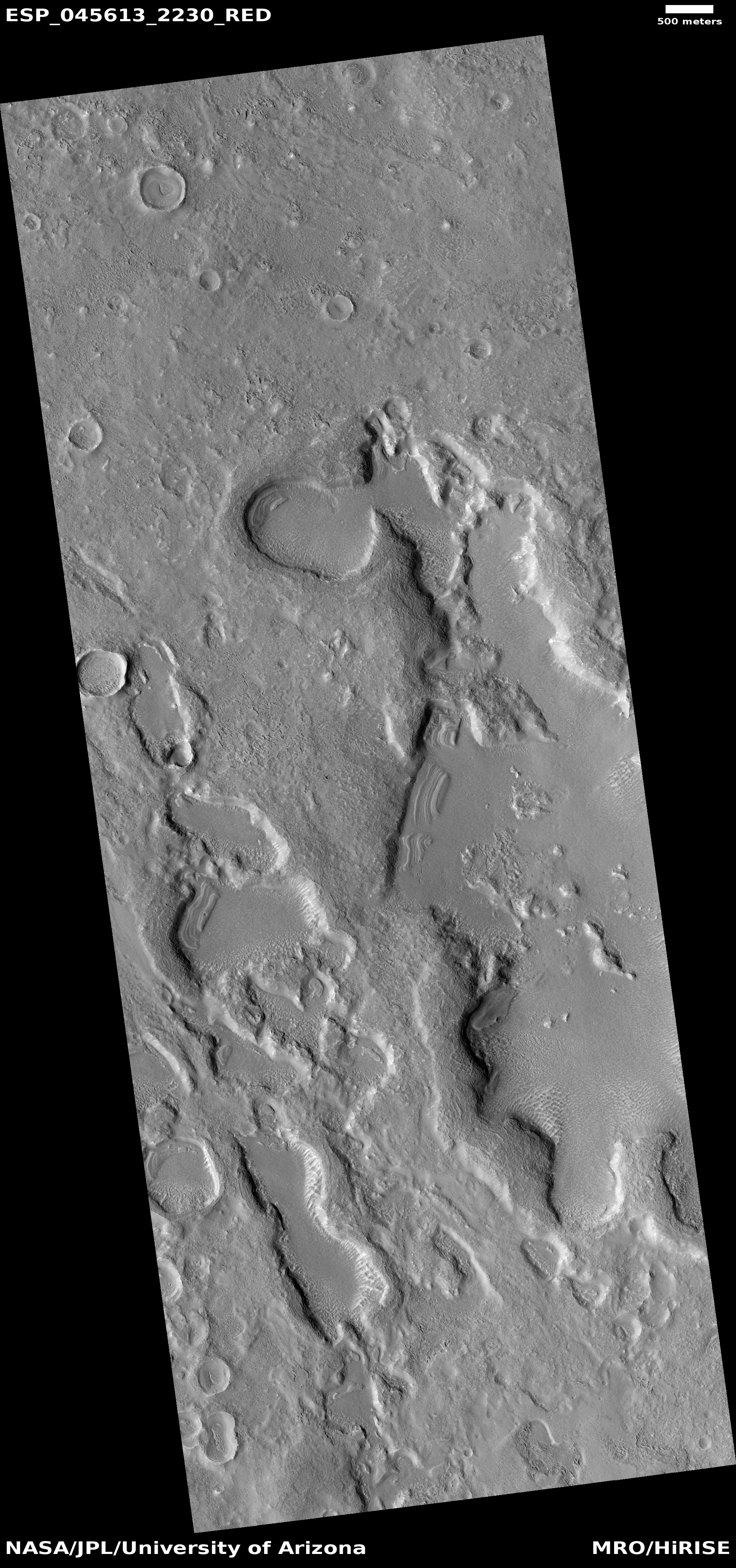
Wide view of dipping layers along mesa walls, as seen by HiRISE under HiWish program Location is Ismenius Lacus quadrangle.

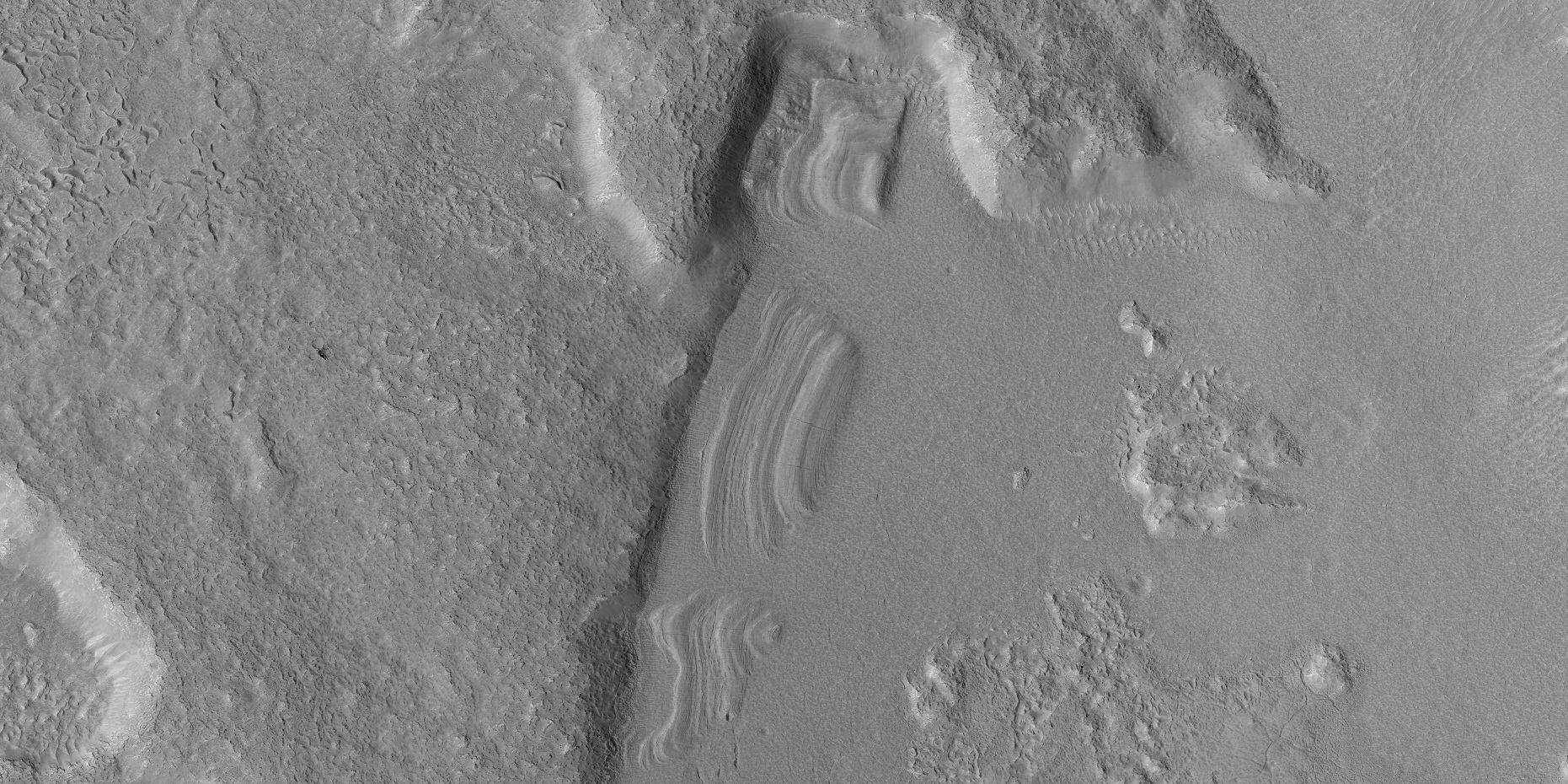
Close view of dipping layers along a mesa wall, as seen by HiRISE under HiWish program Location is Ismenius Lacus quadrangle.

This unit also degrades into brain terrain. Brain terrain is a region of maze-like ridges 3–5 meters high. Some ridges may consist of an ice core, so they may be sources of water for future colonists.

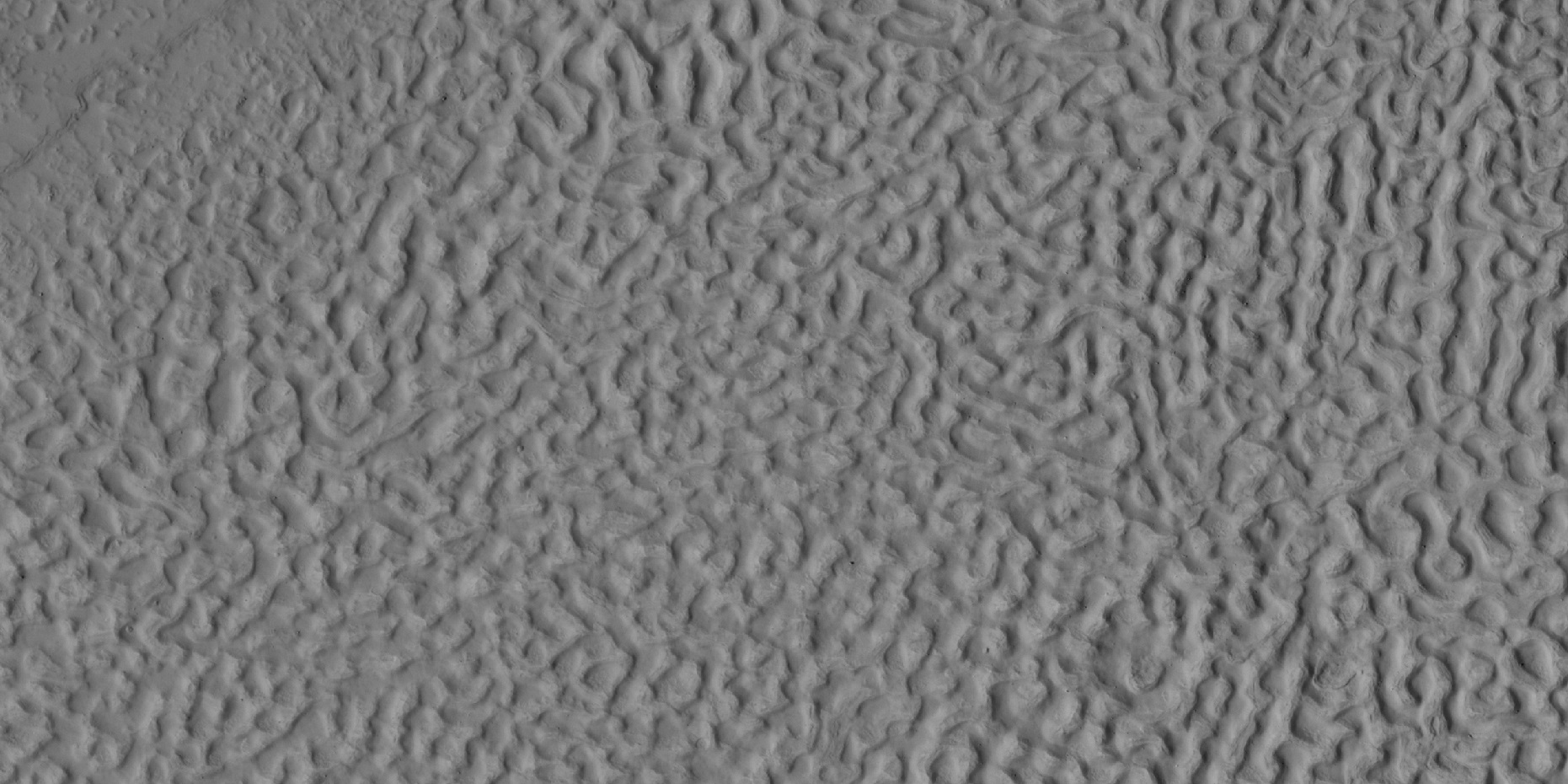
Brain terrain, as seen by HiRISE under HiWish program Location is Ismenius Lacus quadrangle.

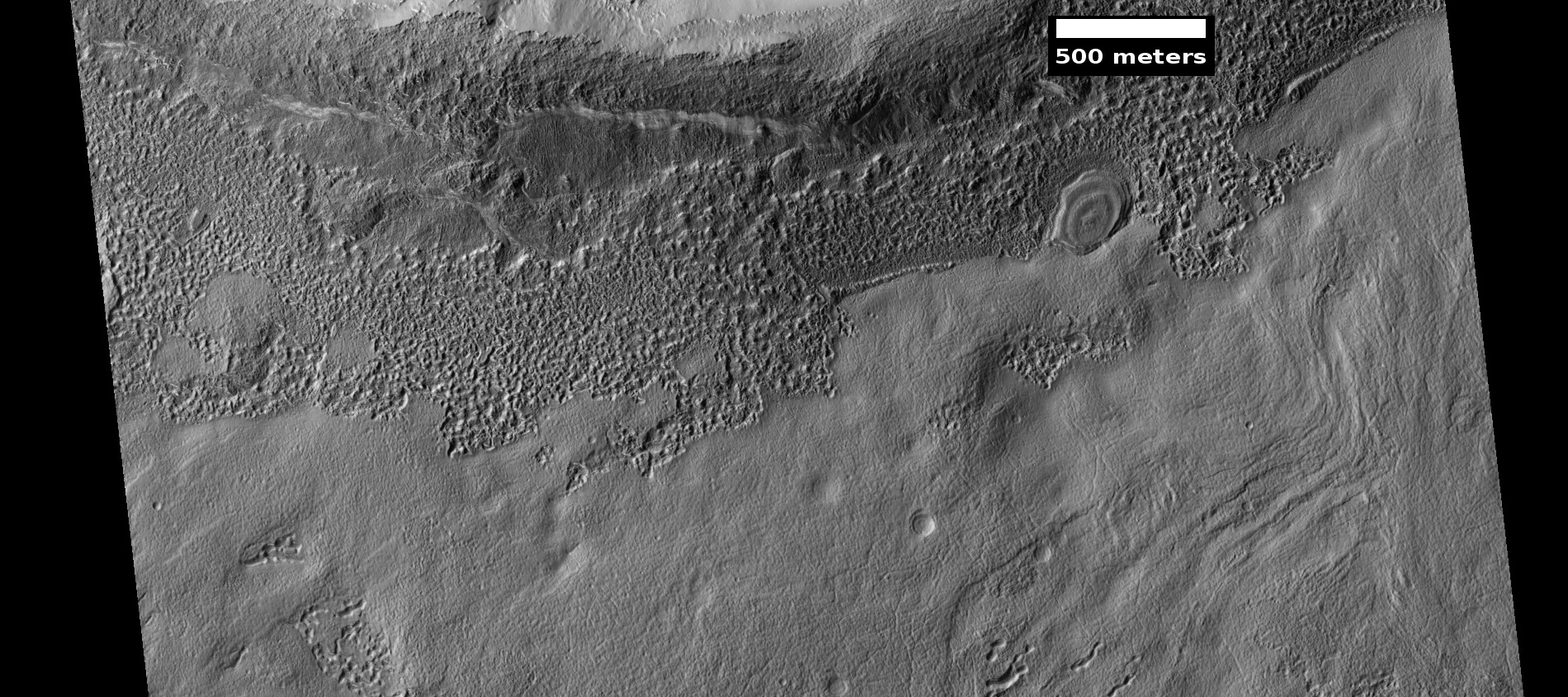
Small, layered structure, as seen by HiRISE under the HiWish program Picture also shows brain terrain forming.

Some regions of the upper plains unit display large fractures and troughs with raised rims; such regions are called ribbed upper plains. Fractures are believed to have started with small cracks from stresses. Stress is suggested to initiate the fracture process since ribbed upper plains are common when debris aprons come together or near the edge of debris aprons—such sites would generate compressional stresses. Cracks exposed more surfaces, and consequently more ice in the material sublimates into the planet's thin atmosphere. Eventually, small cracks become large canyons or troughs. Small cracks often contain small pits and chains of pits; these are thought to be from sublimation of ice in the ground. Large areas of the Martian surface are loaded with ice that is protected by a meters thick layer of dust and other material. However, if cracks appear, a fresh surface will expose ice to the thin atmosphere. In a short time, the ice will disappear into the cold, thin atmosphere in a process called sublimation. Dry ice behaves in a similar fashion on the Earth. On Mars sublimation has been observed when the Phoenix lander uncovered chunks of ice that disappeared in a few days. In addition, HiRISE has seen fresh craters with ice at the bottom. After a time, HiRISE saw the ice deposit disappear.

Die-sized clumps of bright material in the enlarged "Dodo-Goldilocks" trench vanished over the course of four days, implying that they were composed of ice which sublimated following exposure.

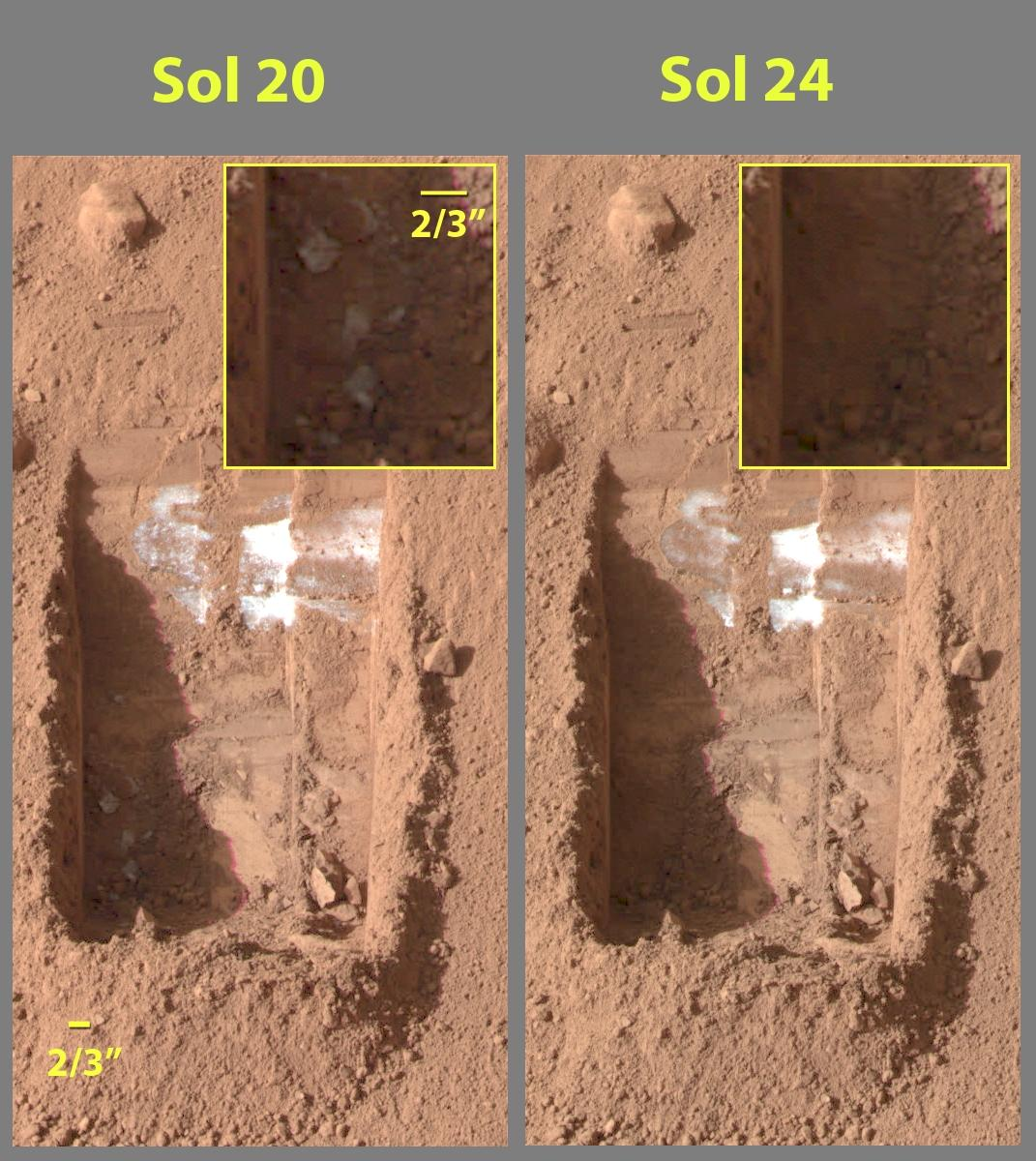
Color versions of the photos showing ice sublimation, with the lower left corner of the trench enlarged in the insets in the upper right of the images.

The upper plains unit is thought to have fallen from the sky. It drapes various surfaces, as if it fell evenly. As is the case for other mantle deposits, the upper plains unit has layers, is fine-grained, and is ice-rich. It is widespread; it does not seem to have a point source. The surface appearance of some regions of Mars is due to how this unit has degraded. It is a major cause of the surface appearance of lobate debris aprons. The layering of the upper plains mantling unit and other mantling units are believed to be caused by major changes in the planet's climate. Models predict that the obliquity or tilt of the rotational axis has varied from its present 25 degrees to maybe over 80 degrees over geological time. Periods of high tilt will cause the ice in the polar caps to be redistributed and change the amount of dust in the atmosphere.

== Latitude dependent mantle ==
Much of the Martian surface is covered with a thick ice-rich, mantle layer that has fallen from the sky a number of times in the past. In some places a number of layers are visible in the mantle.

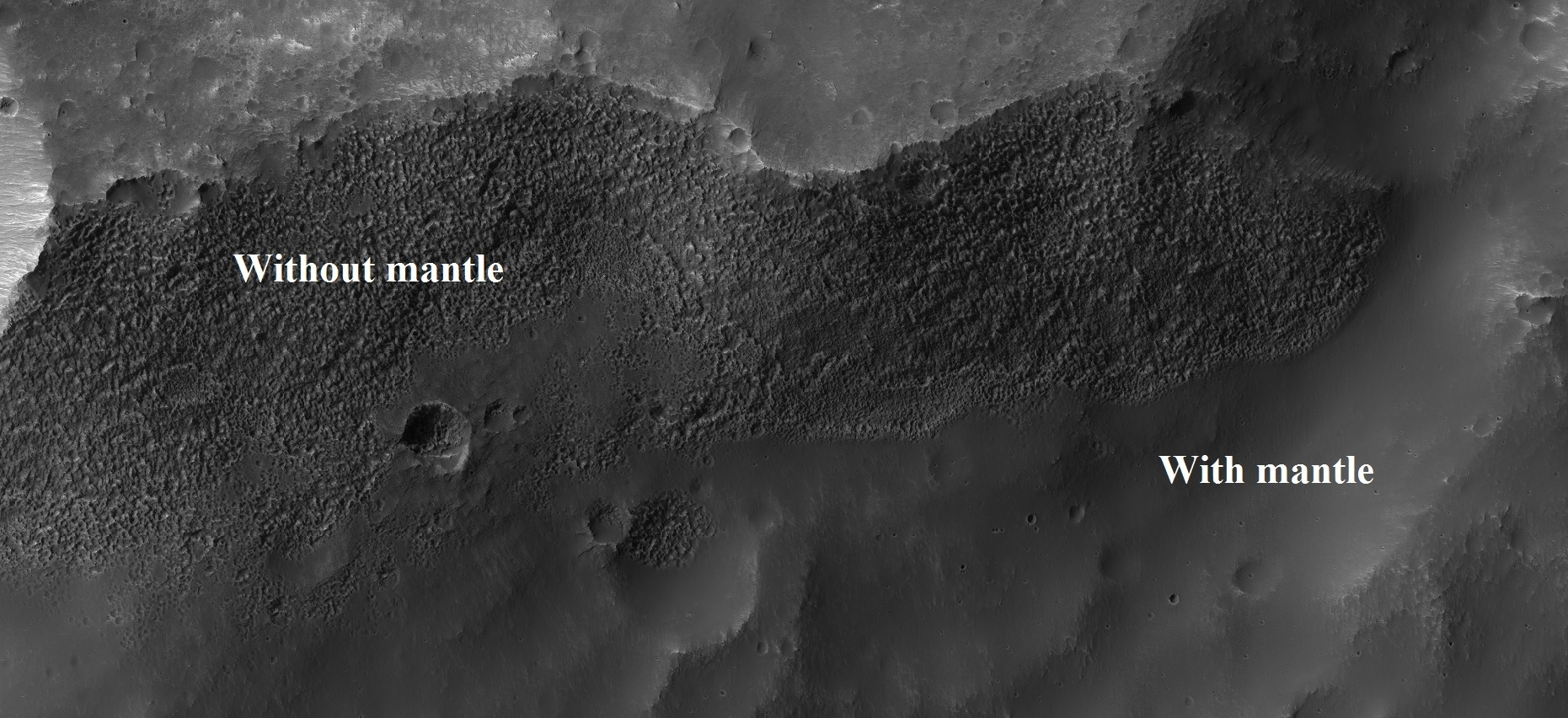
Surface showing appearance with and without mantle covering, as seen by HiRISE, under the HiWish program. Location is Terra Sirenum in Phaethontis quadrangle.

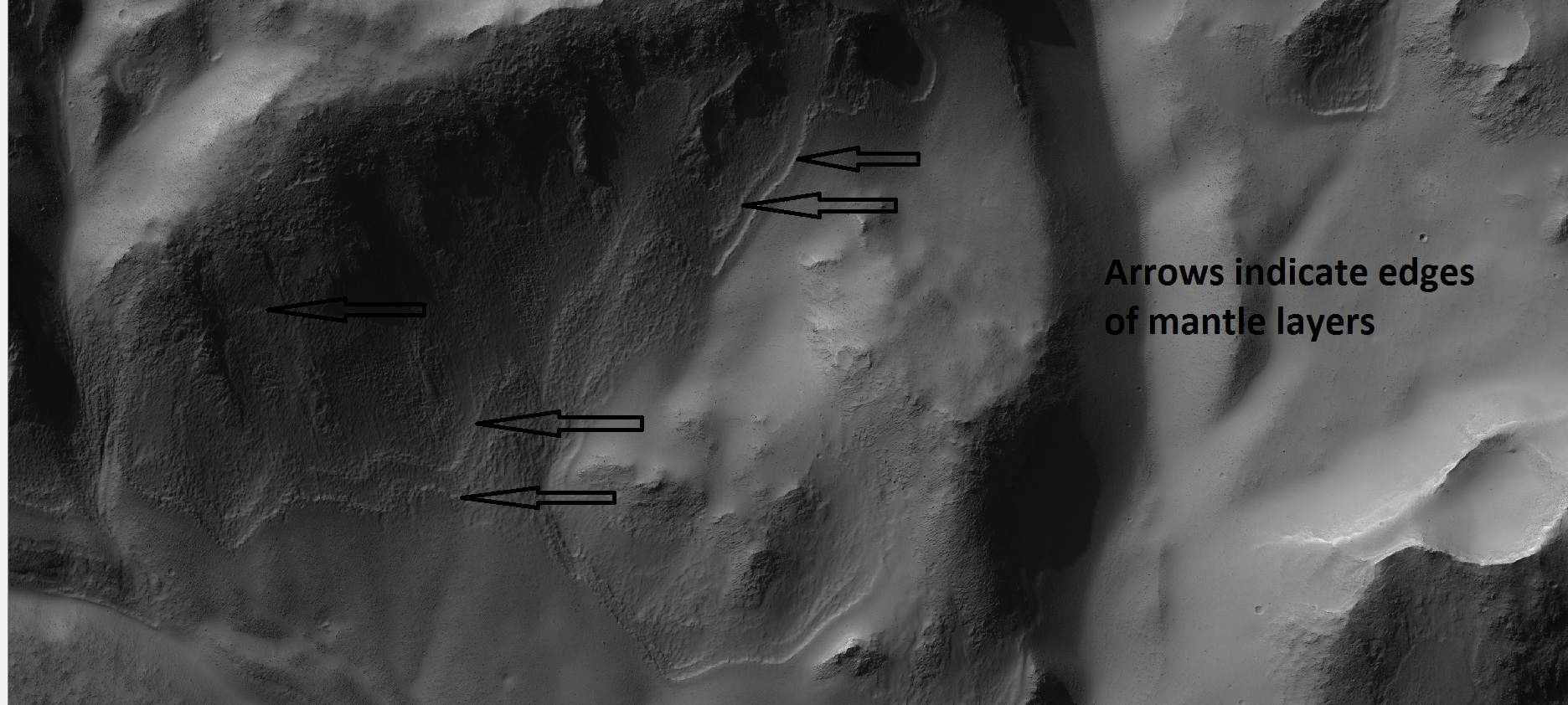
Mantle layers, as seen by HiRISE under HiWish program. Location is Eridania quadrangle

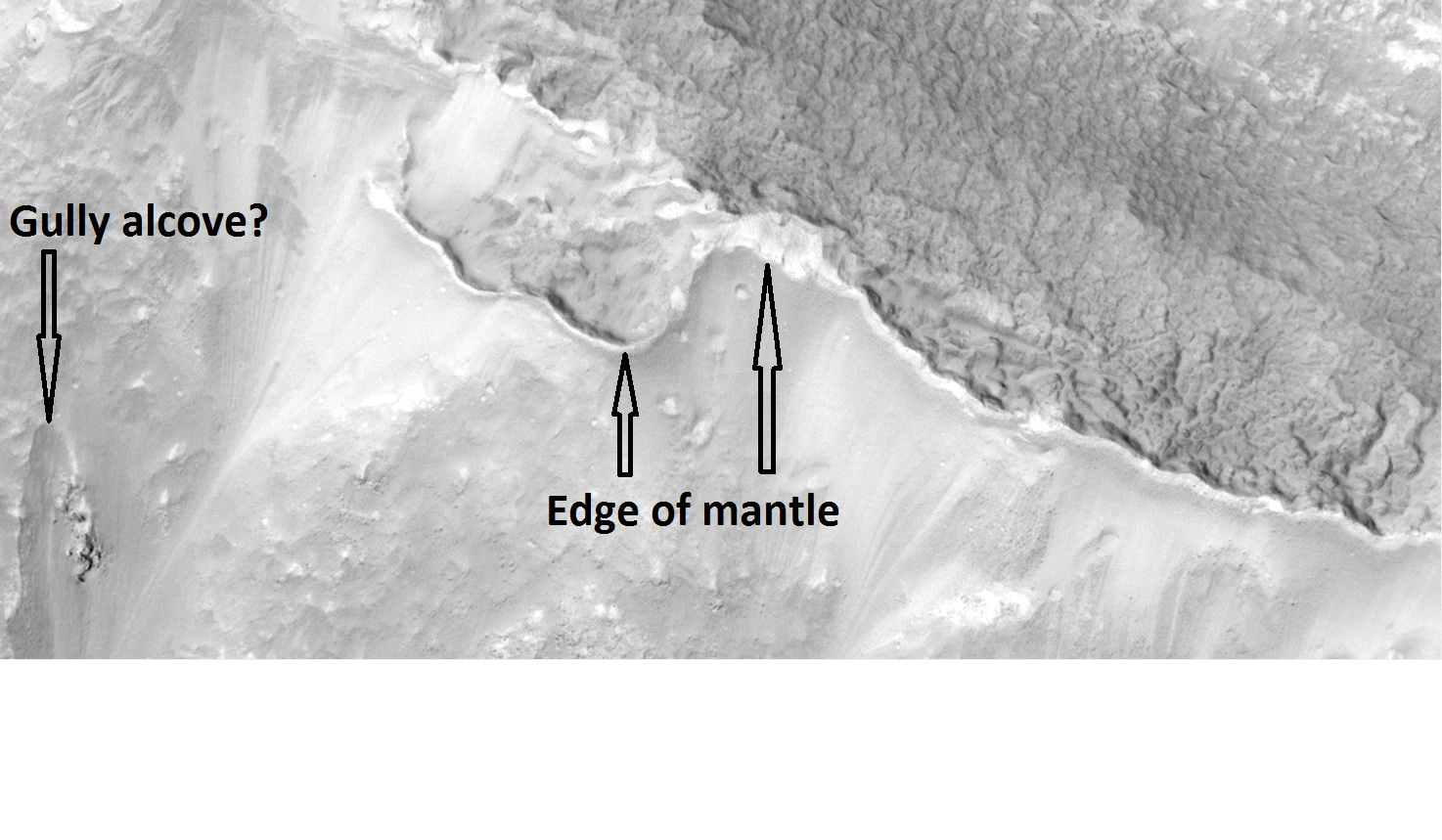
Close up view of mantle, as seen by HiRISE under the HiWish program. Mantle may be composed of ice and dust that fell from the sky during past climatic conditions. Location is Cebrenia quadrangle.

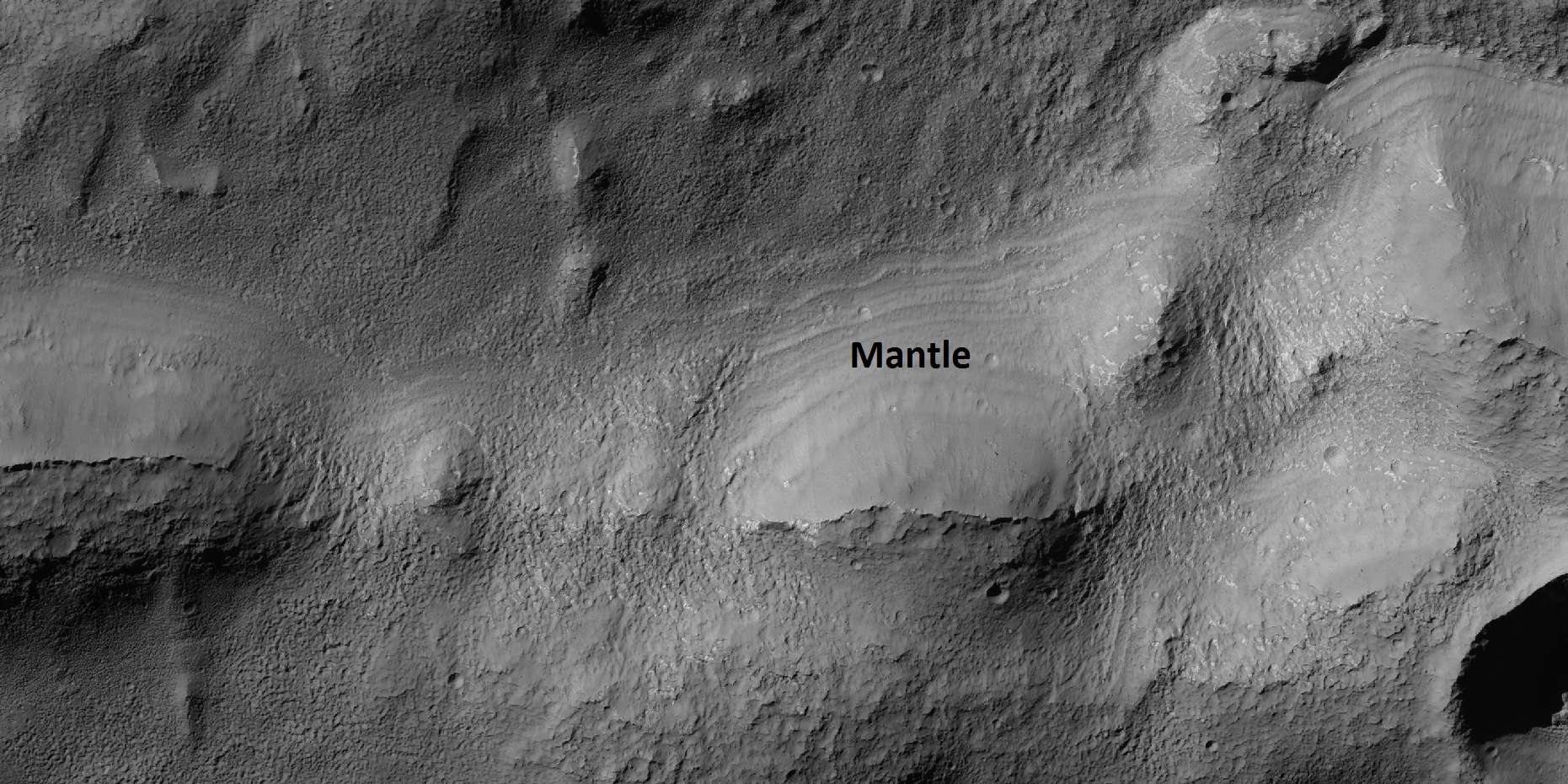
Smooth mantle with layers in Hellas quadrangle, as seen by HiRISE under HiWish program

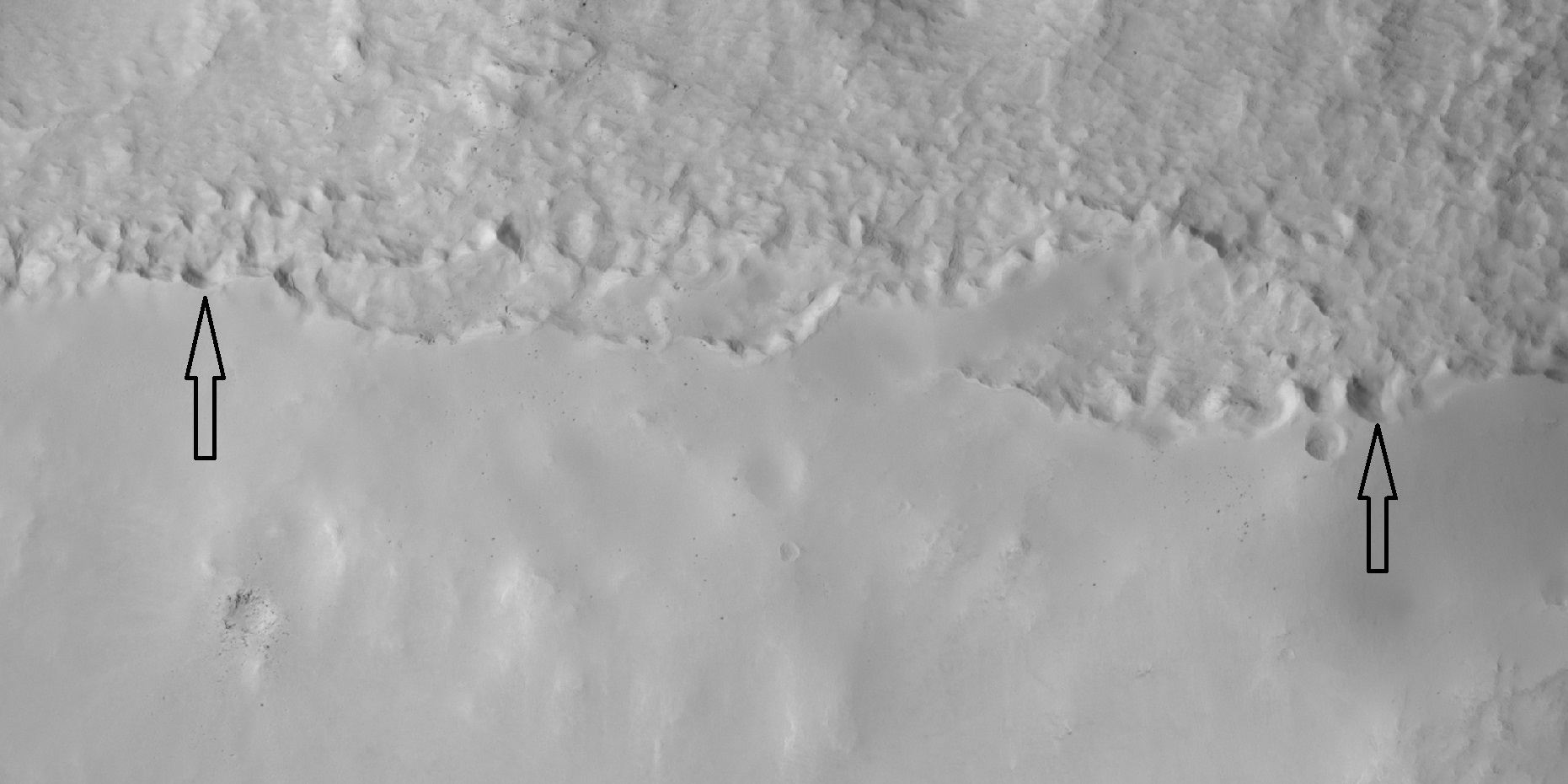
Close view of mantle, as seen by HiRISE under HiWish program Arrows show craters along edge which highlight the thickness of mantle. Location is Ismenius Lacus quadrangle.

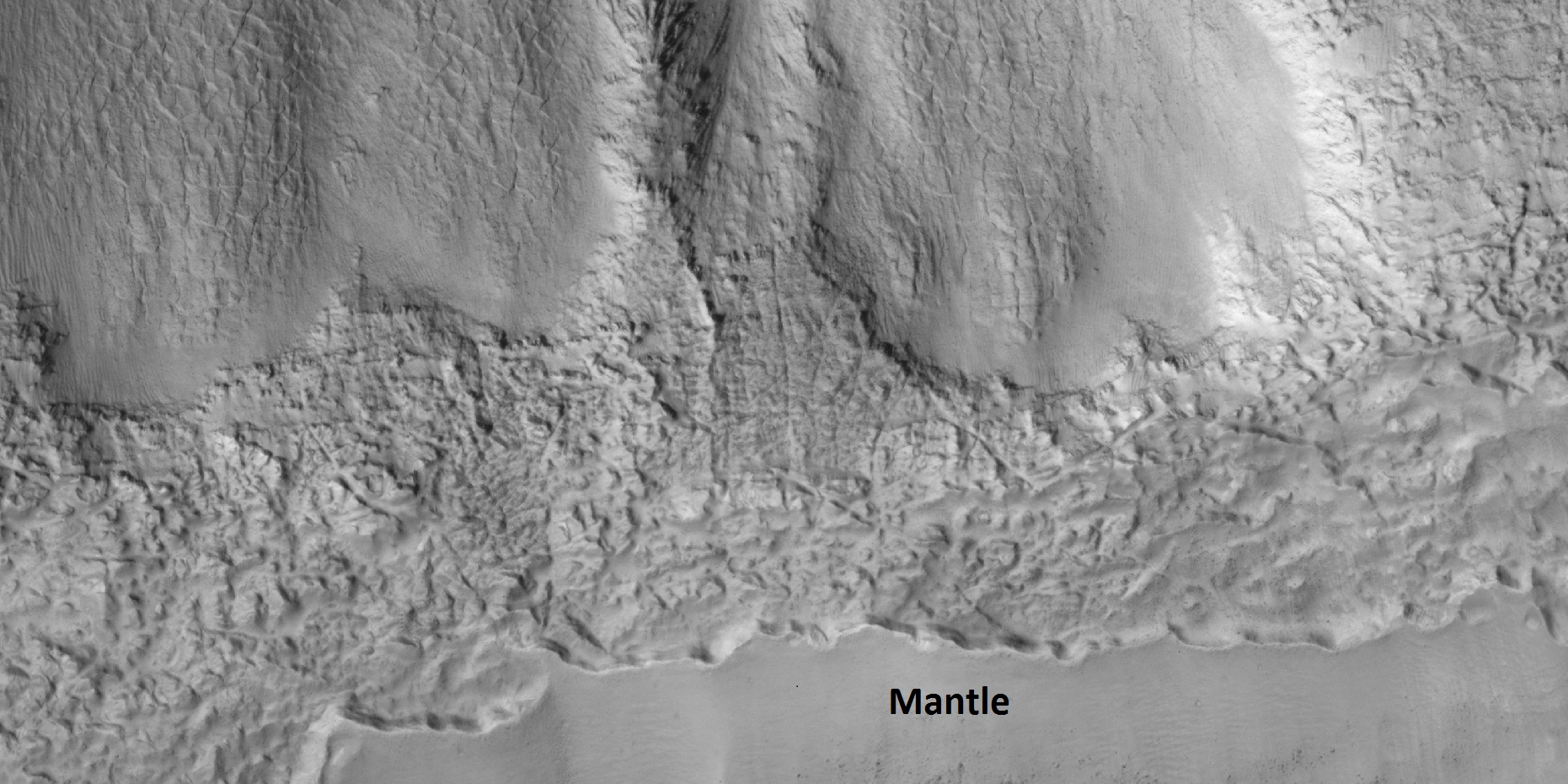
Close view that displays the thickness of the mantle, as seen by HiRISE under HiWish program Location is Ismenius Lacus quadrangle.

It fell as snow and ice-coated dust. There is good evidence that this mantle is ice-rich. The shapes of the polygons common on many surfaces suggest ice-rich soil. High levels of hydrogen (probably from water) have been found with Mars Odyssey. Thermal measurements from orbit suggest ice. The Phoenix Lander found water ice directly since it landed in a field of polygons and its landing rockets exposed a pure ice surface. Theory had predicted that ice would be found under a few cm of soil. This mantle layer is called "latitude dependent mantle" because its occurrence is related to the latitude. It is this mantle that cracks and then forms polygonal ground. This cracking of ice-rich ground is predicted based on physical processes.

== Polygonal patterned ground ==
Polygonal, patterned ground is quite common in some regions of Mars. It is commonly believed to be caused by the sublimation of ice from the ground. Sublimation is the direct change of solid ice to a gas. This is similar to what happens to dry ice on the Earth. Places on Mars that display polygonal ground may indicate where future colonists can find water ice. Patterned ground forms in a mantle layer, called latitude dependent mantle, that fell from the sky when the climate was different.

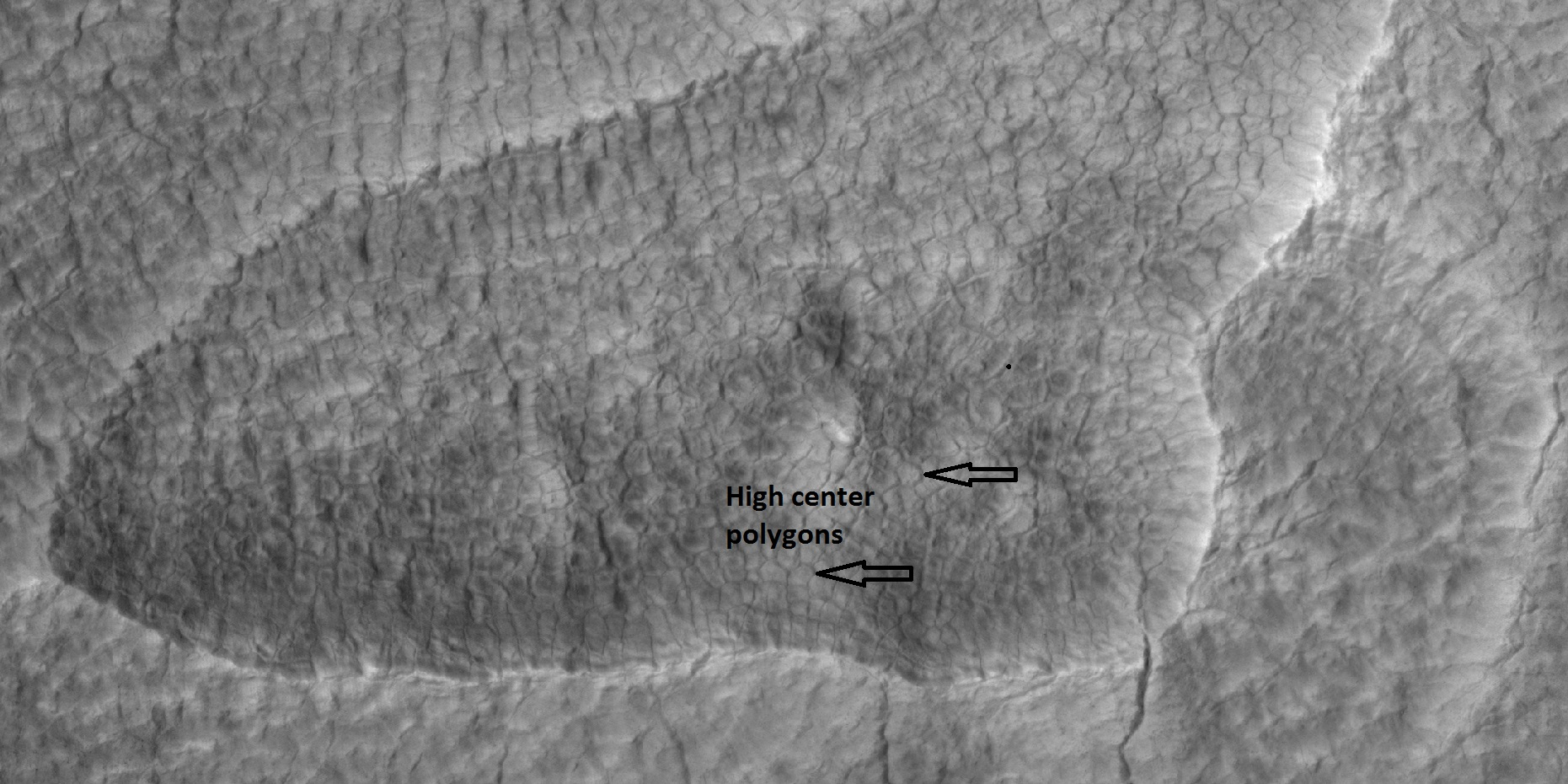
High center polygons, shown with arrows, as seen by HiRISE under HiWish program. Location is Casius quadrangle. Image enlarged with HiView.

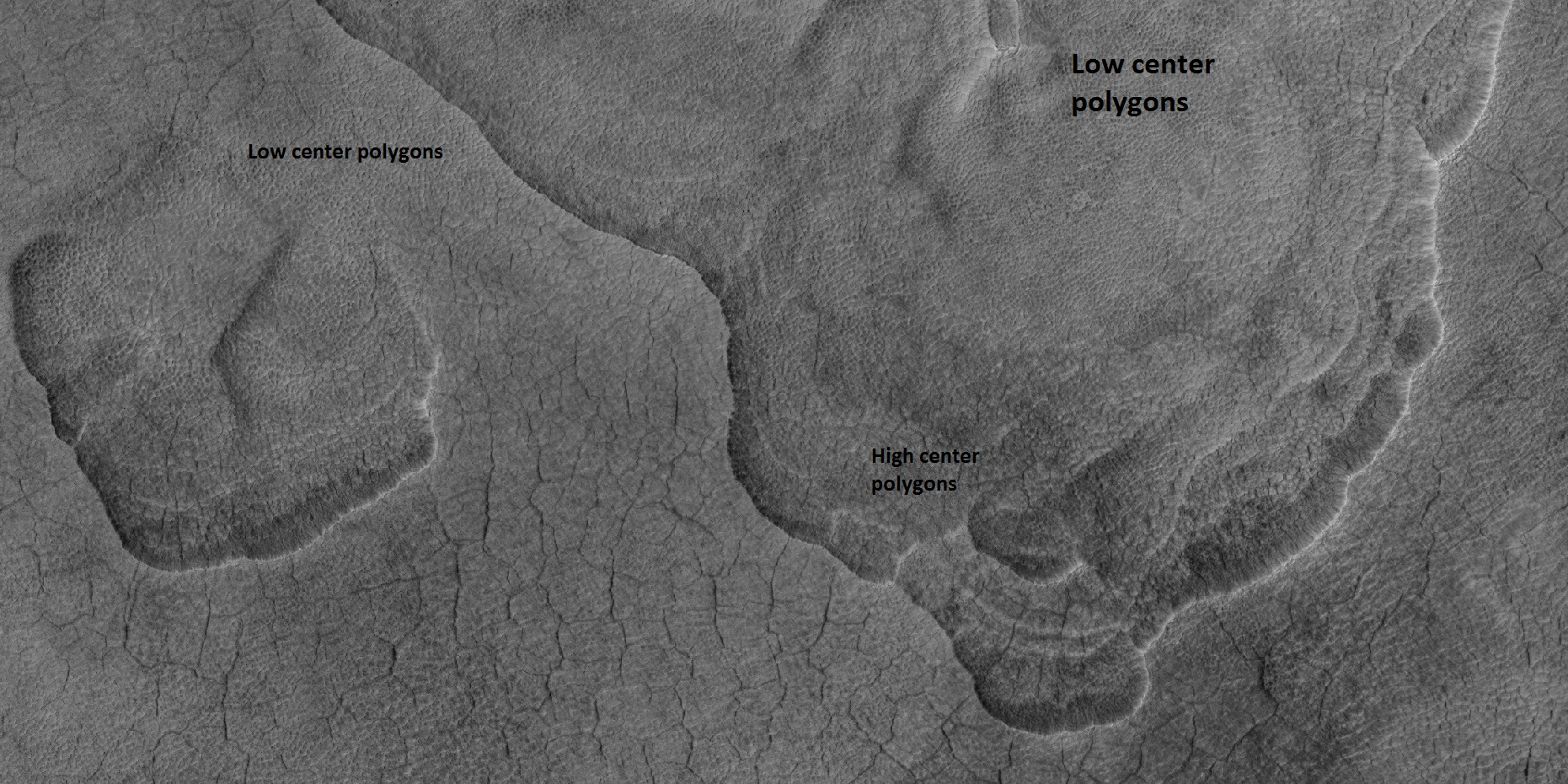
Scalloped terrain labeled with both low center polygons and high center polygons, as seen by HiRISE under HiWish program Location is Casius quadrangle. Image enlarged with HiView.

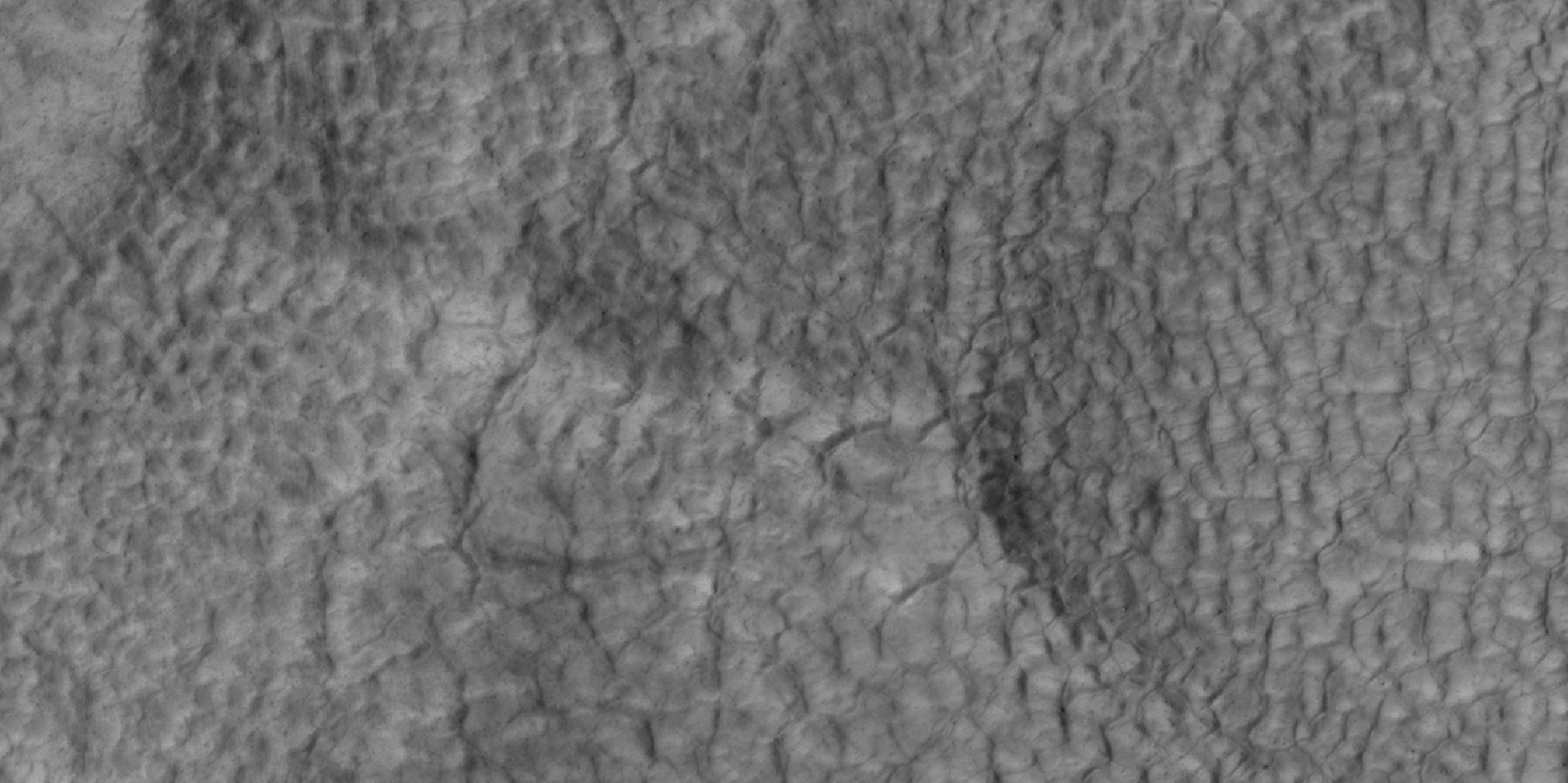
High and low center polygons, as seen by HiRISE under HiWish program Location is Casius quadrangle. Image enlarged with HiView.

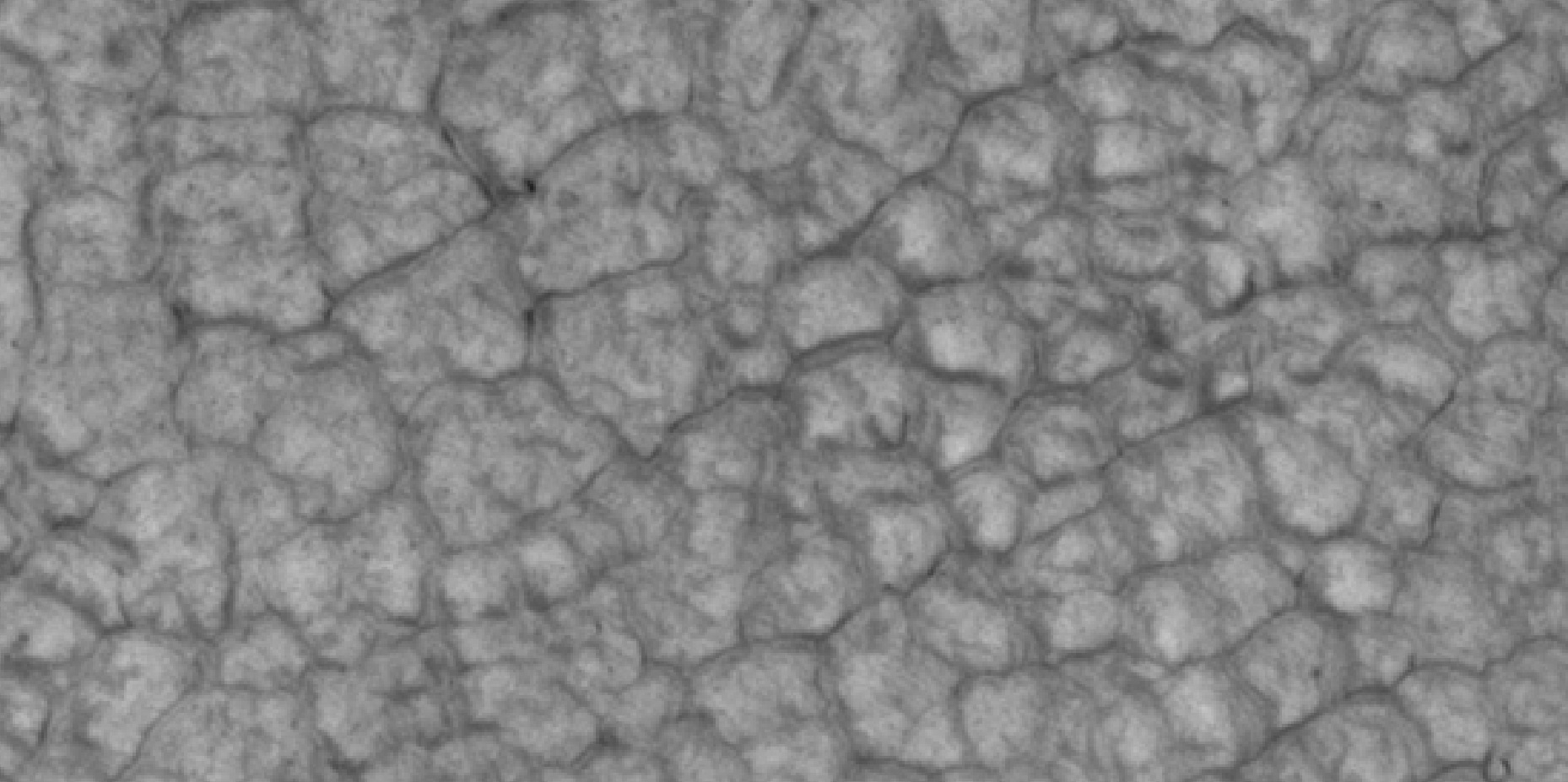
Close-up of high center polygons seen by HiRISE under HiWish program Troughs between polygons are easily visible in this view. Location is Ismenius Lacus quadrangle.

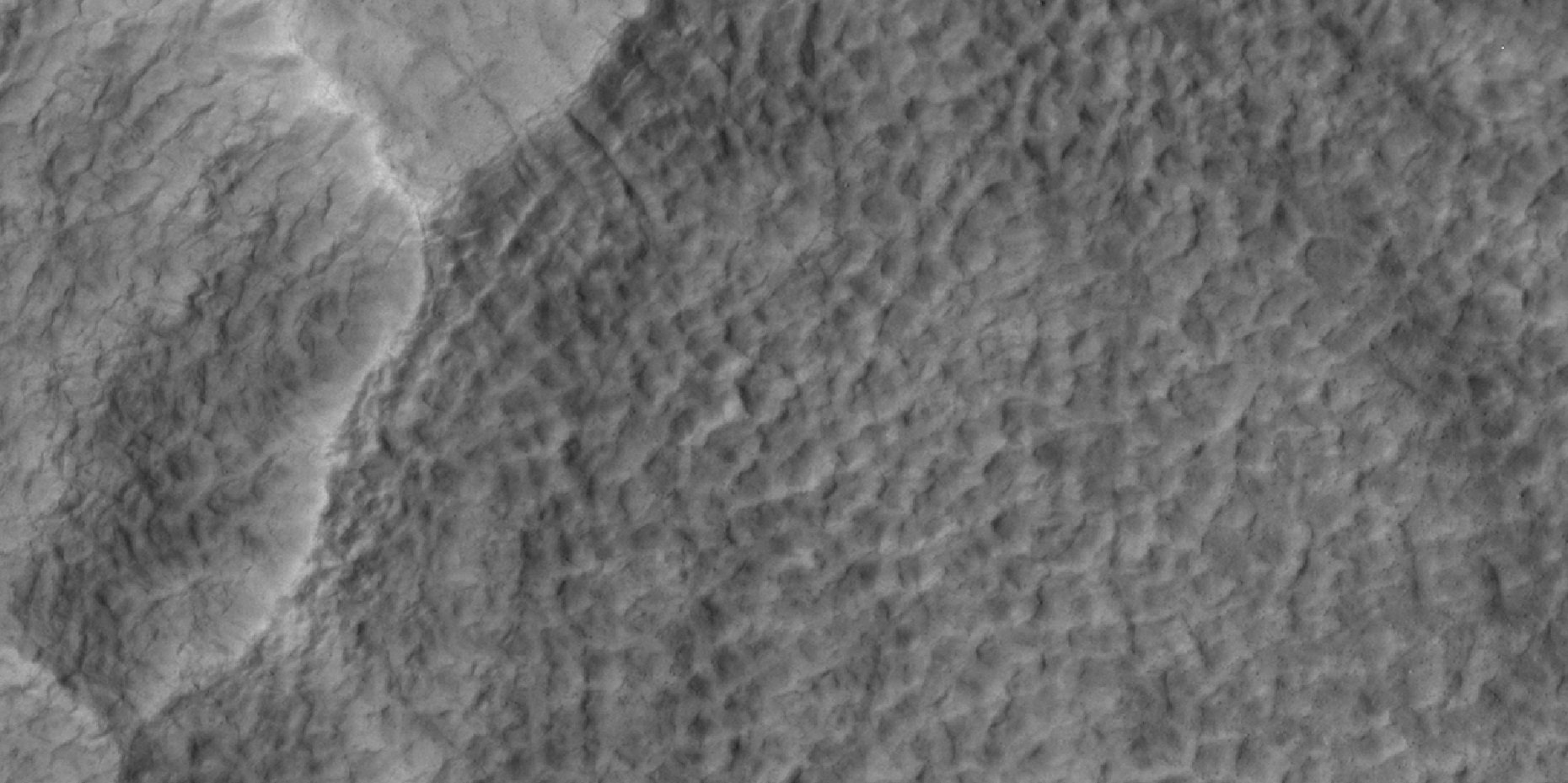
Low center polygons, as seen by HiRISE under HiWish program Location is Casius quadrangle. Image enlarged with HiView. Location is Casius quadrangle.

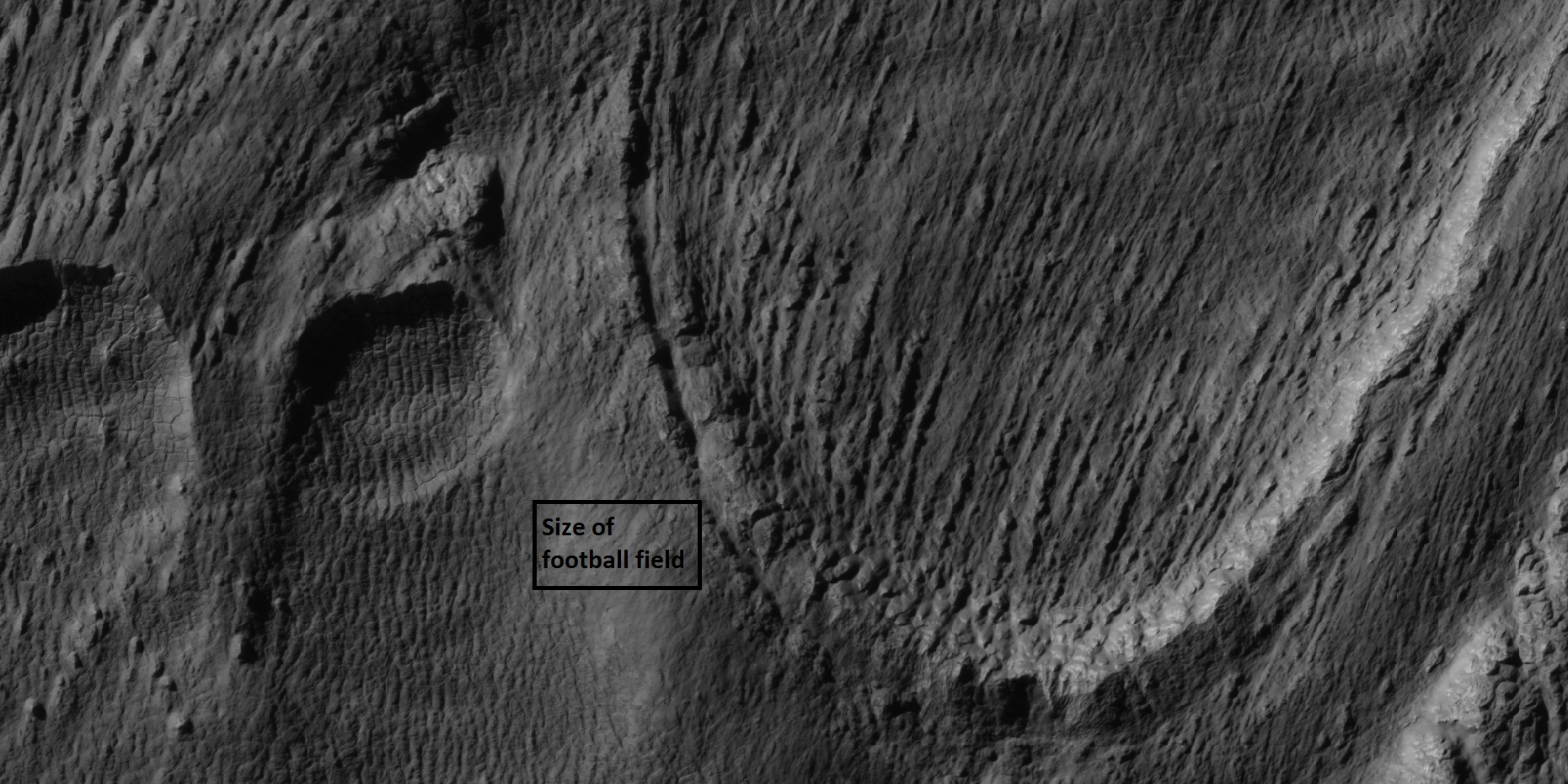
Close view of snout of glacier, as seen by HiRISE under the HiWish program High center polygons are visible. Box shows size of football field.

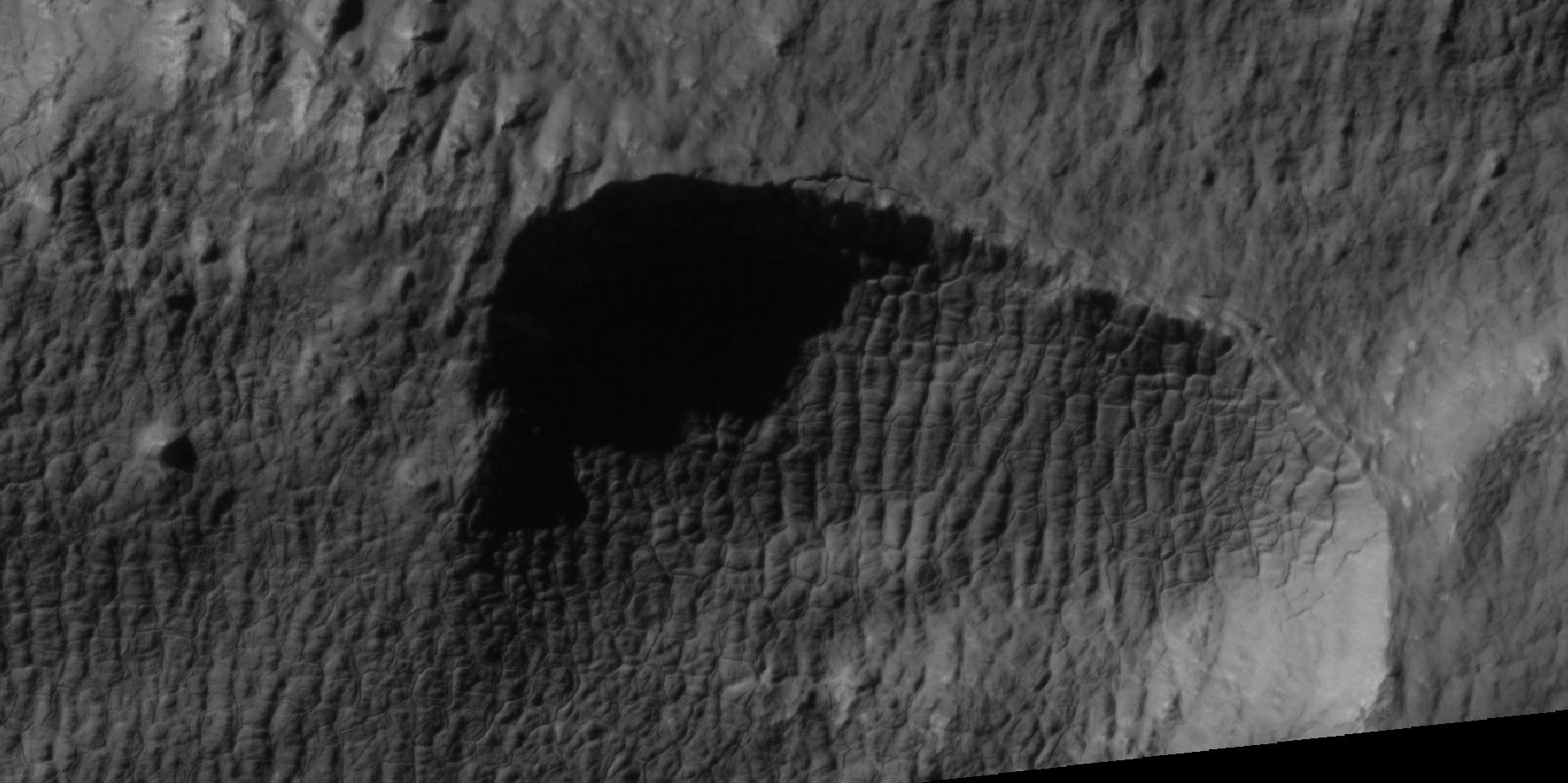
Close view of high center polygons near glacier, as seen by HiRISE under the HiWish program

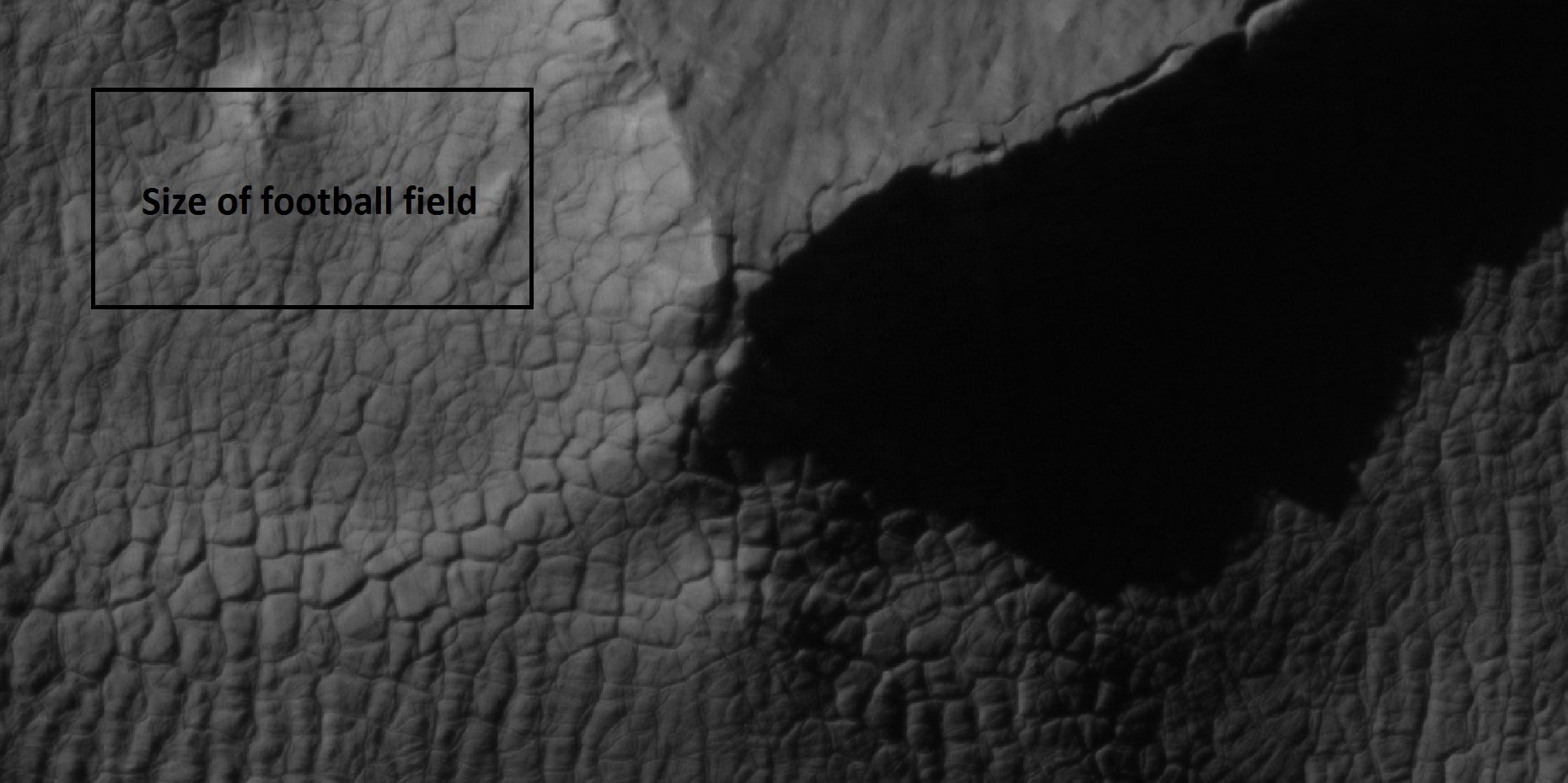
Close view of high center polygons near glacier, as seen by HiRISE under the HiWish program Box shows size of football field.
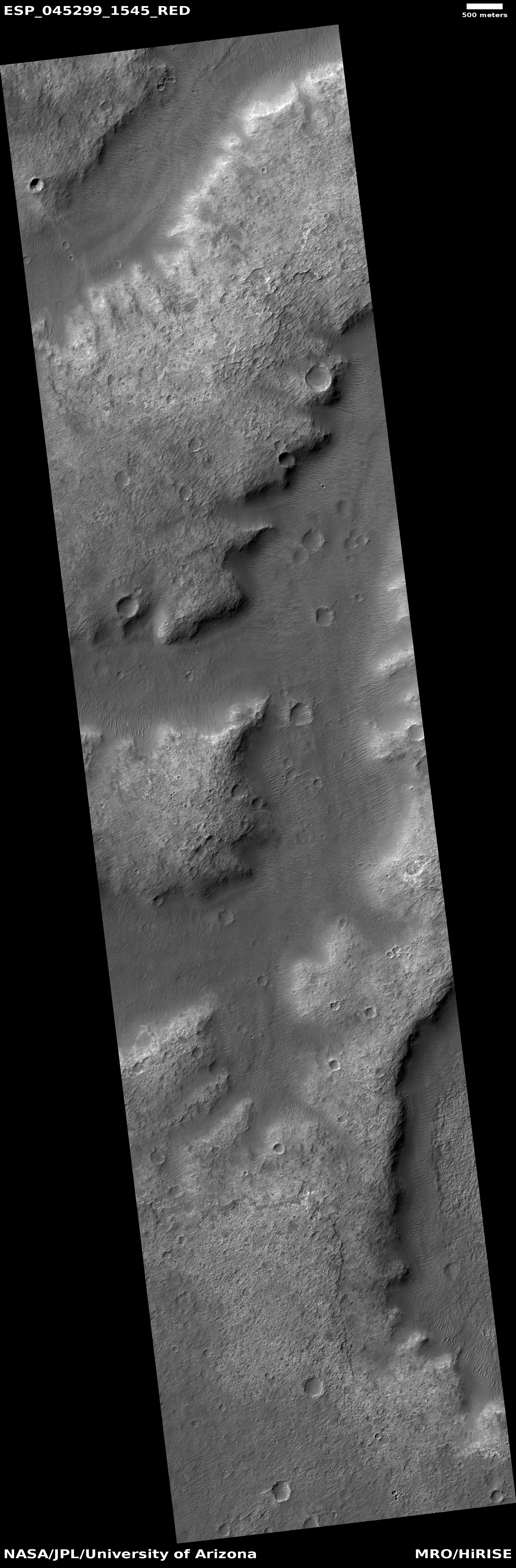
Wide view of a group of channels, as seen by HiRISE under HiWish project Some parts of the surface show patterned ground when enlarged.

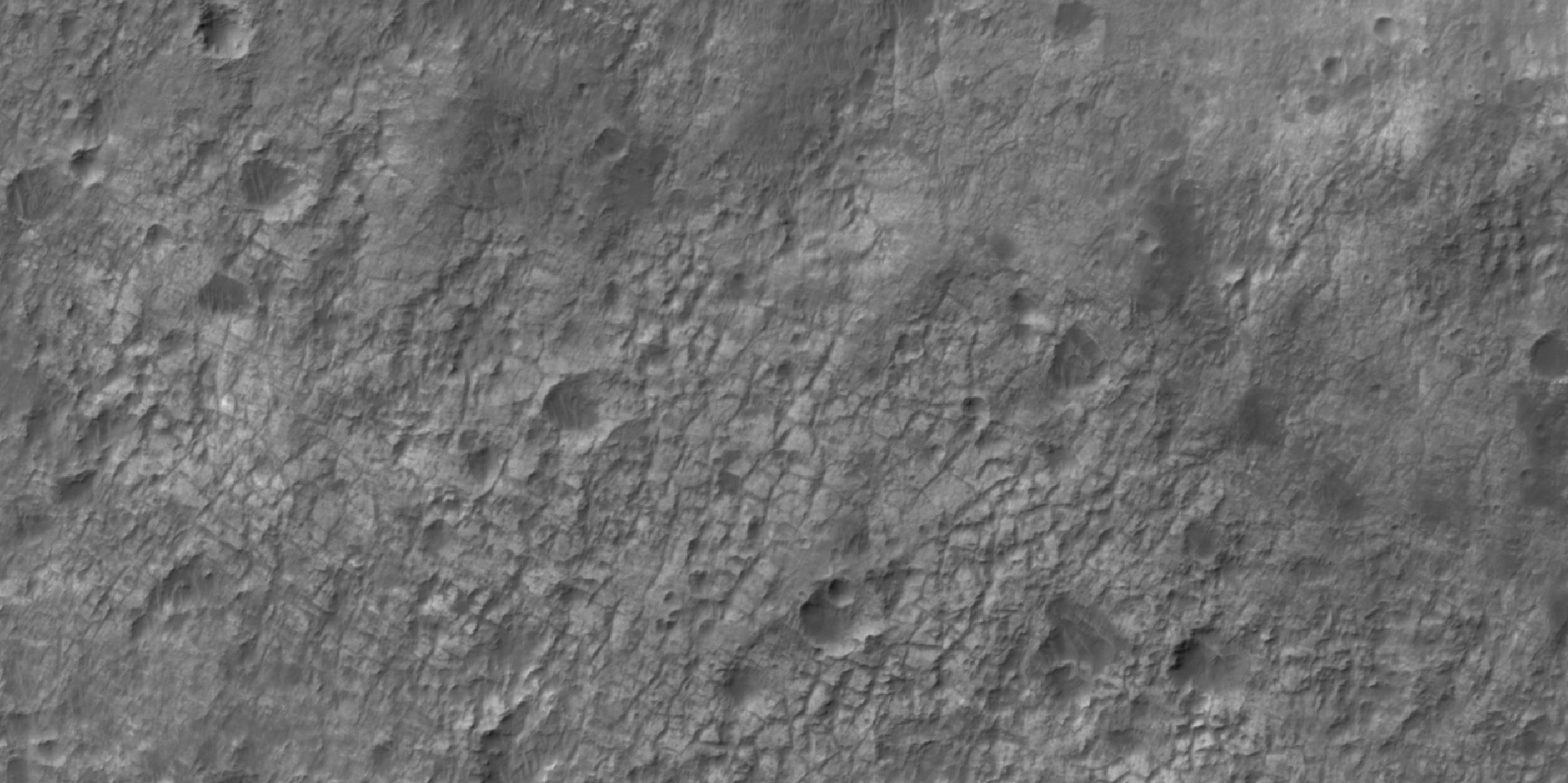
Patterned ground, as seen by HiRISE under HiWish program This is a close up from previous image.

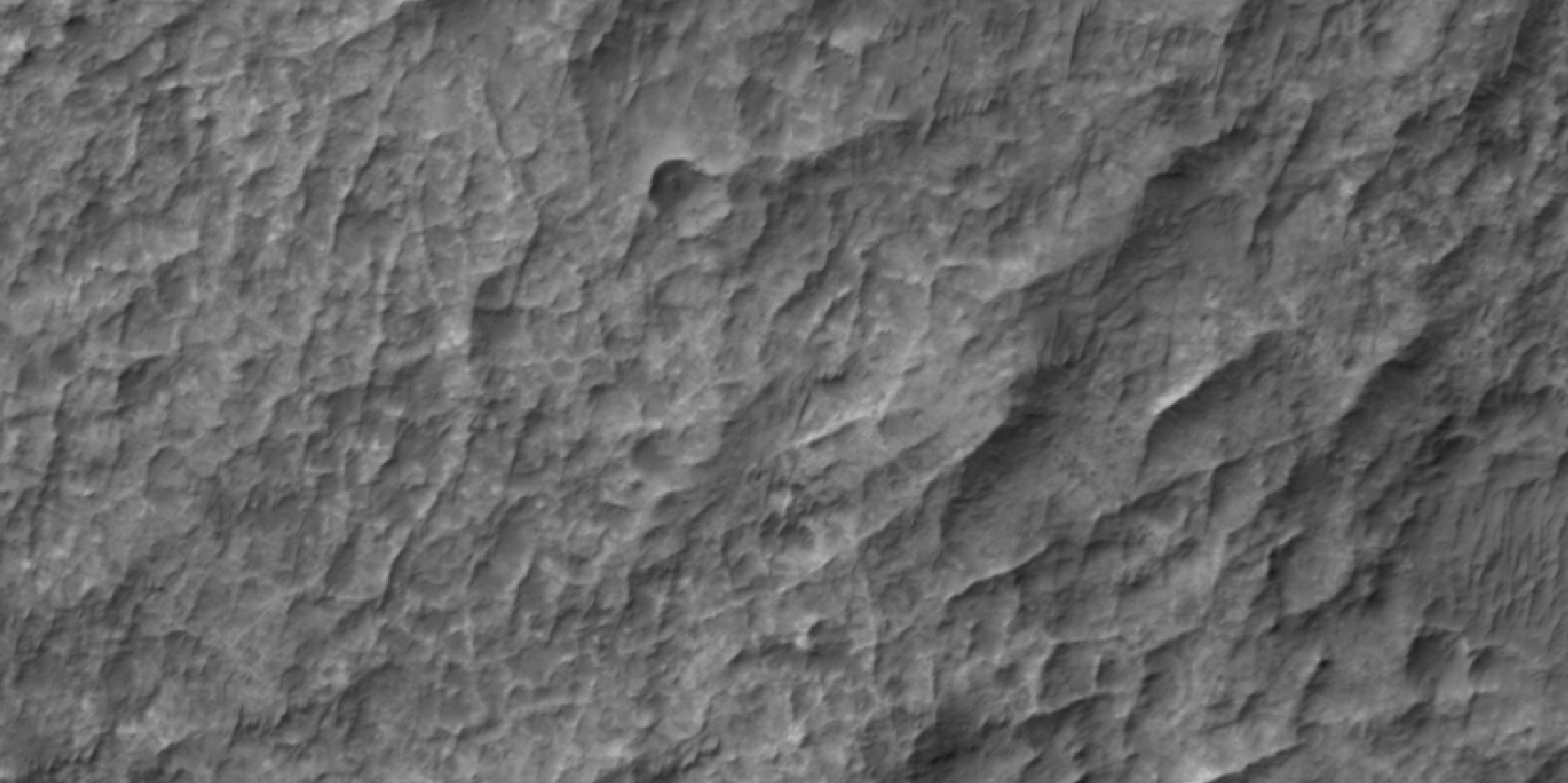
Ridges, as seen by HiRISE under HiWish program This is a close up from a previous image.

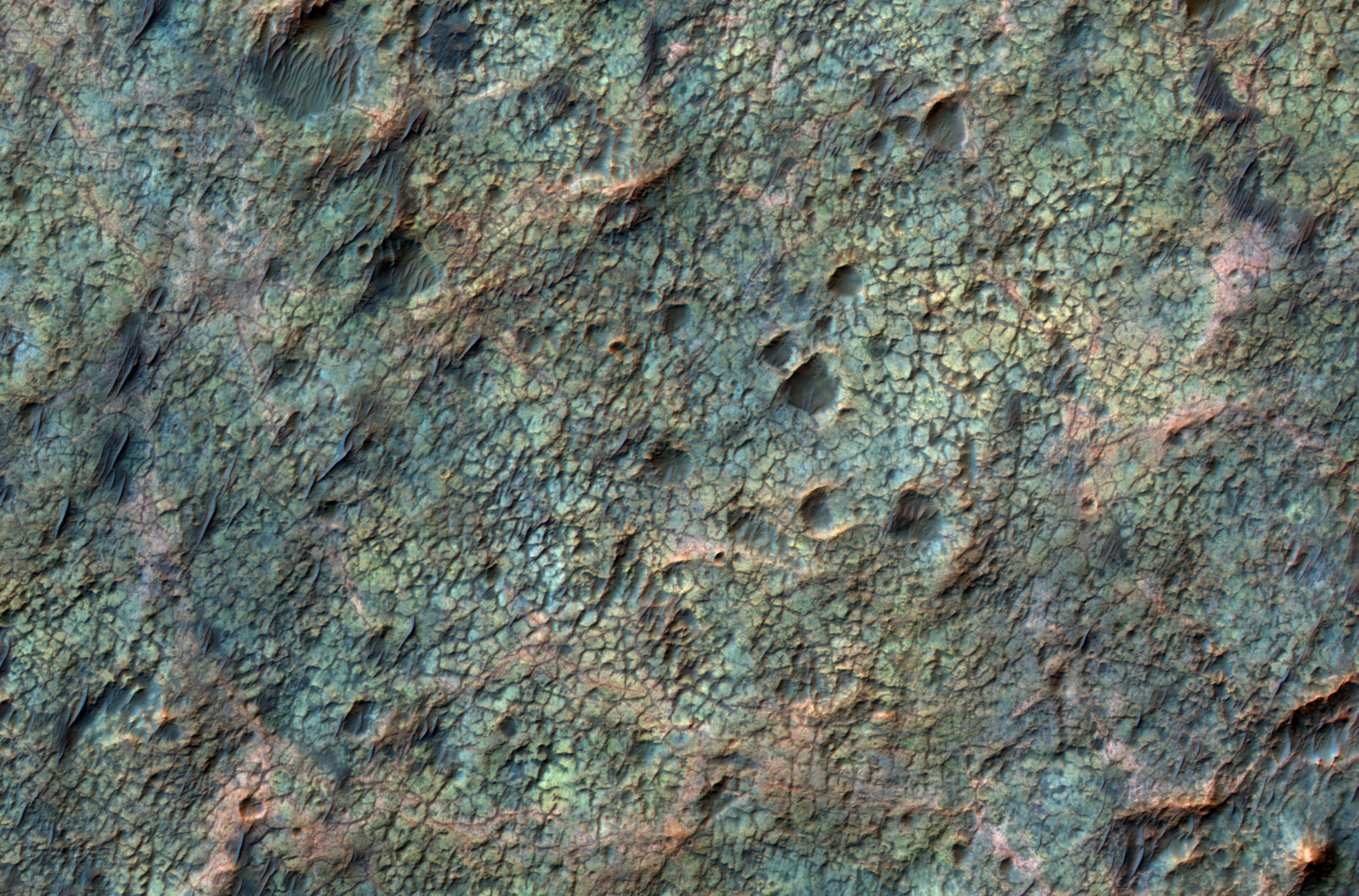
Color image of patterned ground, enlarged from a previous image, as seen by HiRISE under HiWish program

== Scalloped topography ==
Scalloped topography is common in the mid-latitudes of Mars, between 45° and 60° north and south. It is particularly prominent in the region of Utopia Planitia in the northern hemisphere and in the region of Peneus and Amphitrites Patera in the southern hemisphere. Such topography consists of shallow, rimless depressions with scalloped edges, commonly referred to as "scalloped depressions" or simply "scallops". Scalloped depressions can be isolated or clustered and sometimes seem to coalesce. A typical scalloped depression displays a gentle equator-facing slope and a steeper pole-facing scarp. This topographic asymmetry is probably due to differences in insolation. Scalloped depressions are believed to form from the removal of subsurface material, possibly interstitial ice, by sublimation. This process may still be happening at present.

On November 22, 2016, NASA reported finding a large amount of underground ice in the Utopia Planitia region of Mars. The volume of water detected has been estimated to be equivalent to the volume of water in Lake Superior. The volume of water ice in the region were based on measurements from the ground-penetrating radar instrument on Mars Reconnaissance Orbiter, called SHARAD. From the data obtained from SHARAD, “dielectric permittivity”, or the dielectric constant was determined. The dielectric constant value was consistent with a large concentration of water ice.

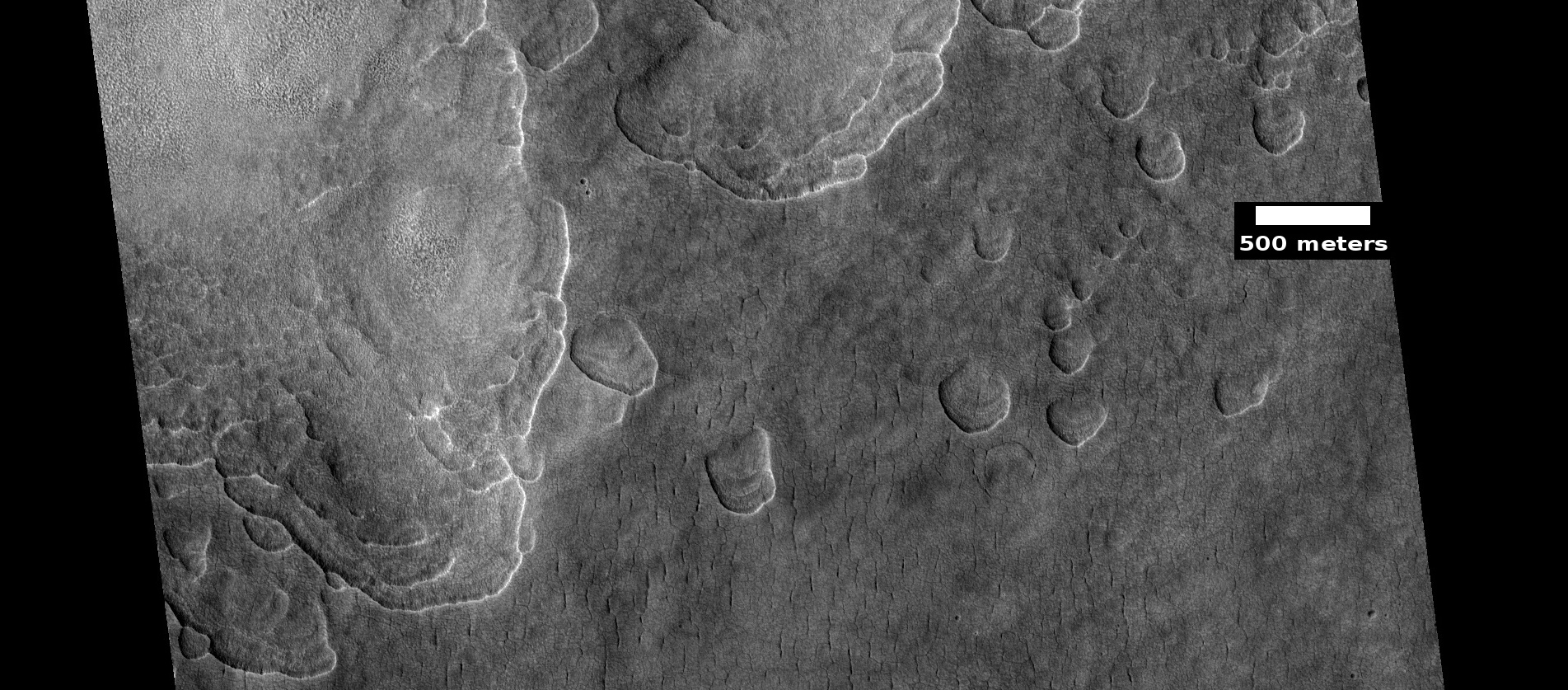
Scalloped ground, as seen by HiRISE under HiWish program.

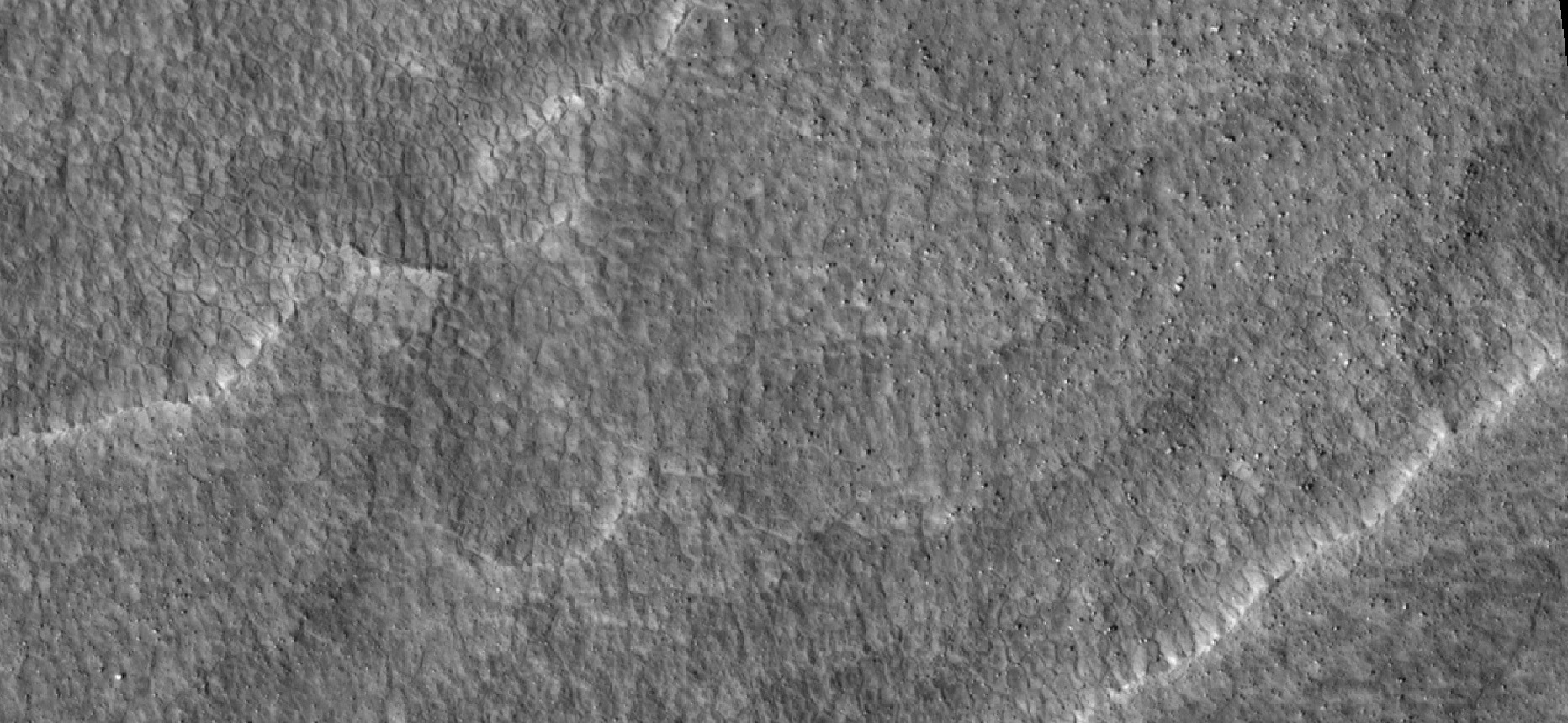
Close-up of scalloped ground, as seen by HiRISE under HiWish program. Surface is divided into polygons; these forms are common where ground freezes and thaws. Note: this is an enlargement of a previous image.

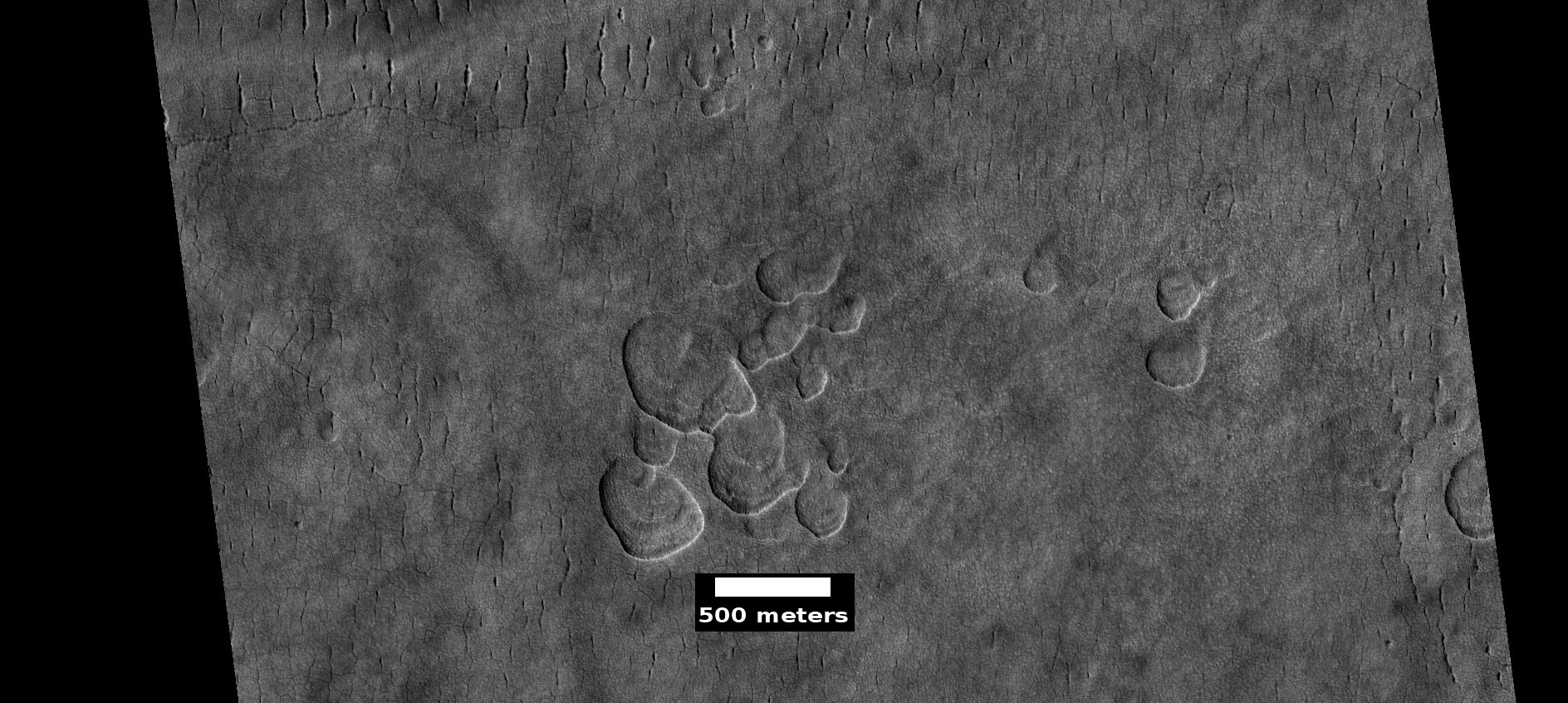
Scalloped ground, as seen by HiRISE under HiWish program.

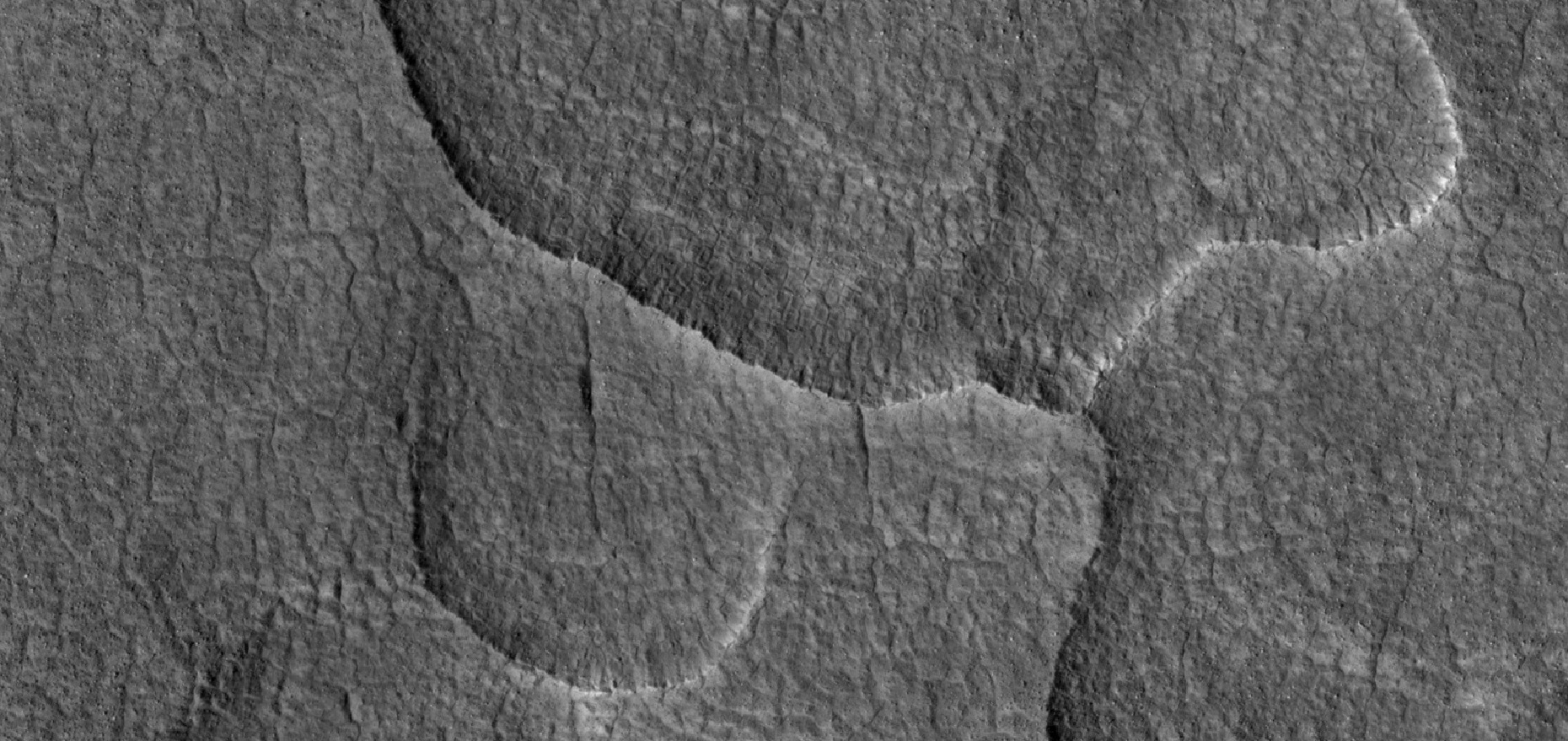
Close-up of scalloped ground, as seen by HiRISE under HiWish program. Surface is divided into polygons; these forms are common where ground freezes and thaws. Note: this is an enlargement of a previous image.

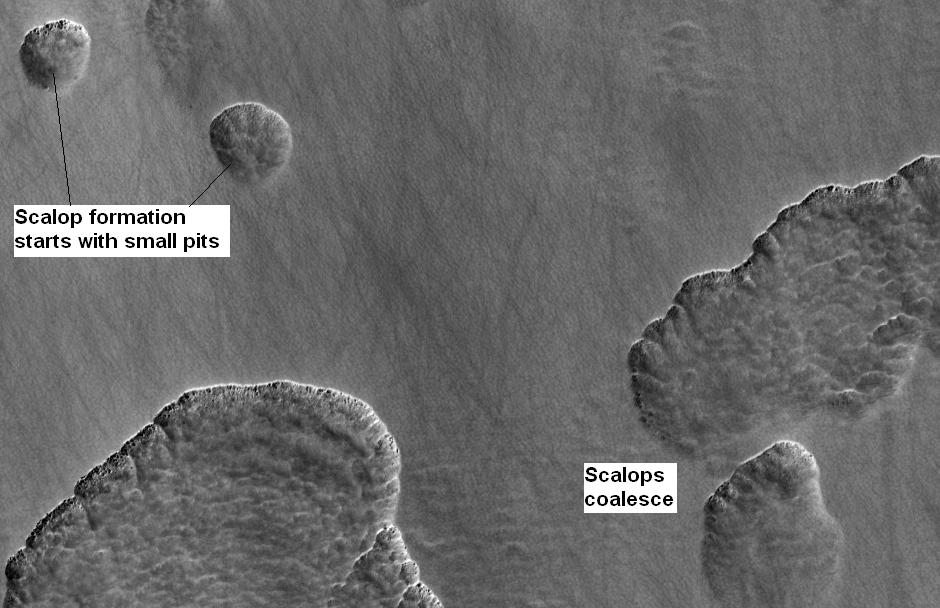
Stages in scallop formation, as seen by HiRISE. Location is Hellas quadrangle.

== Ancient rivers? ==
There is great deal of evidence that water once flowed in river valleys on Mars. Pictures from orbit show winding valleys, branched valleys, and even meanders with oxbow lakes. Some are visible in the pictures below.

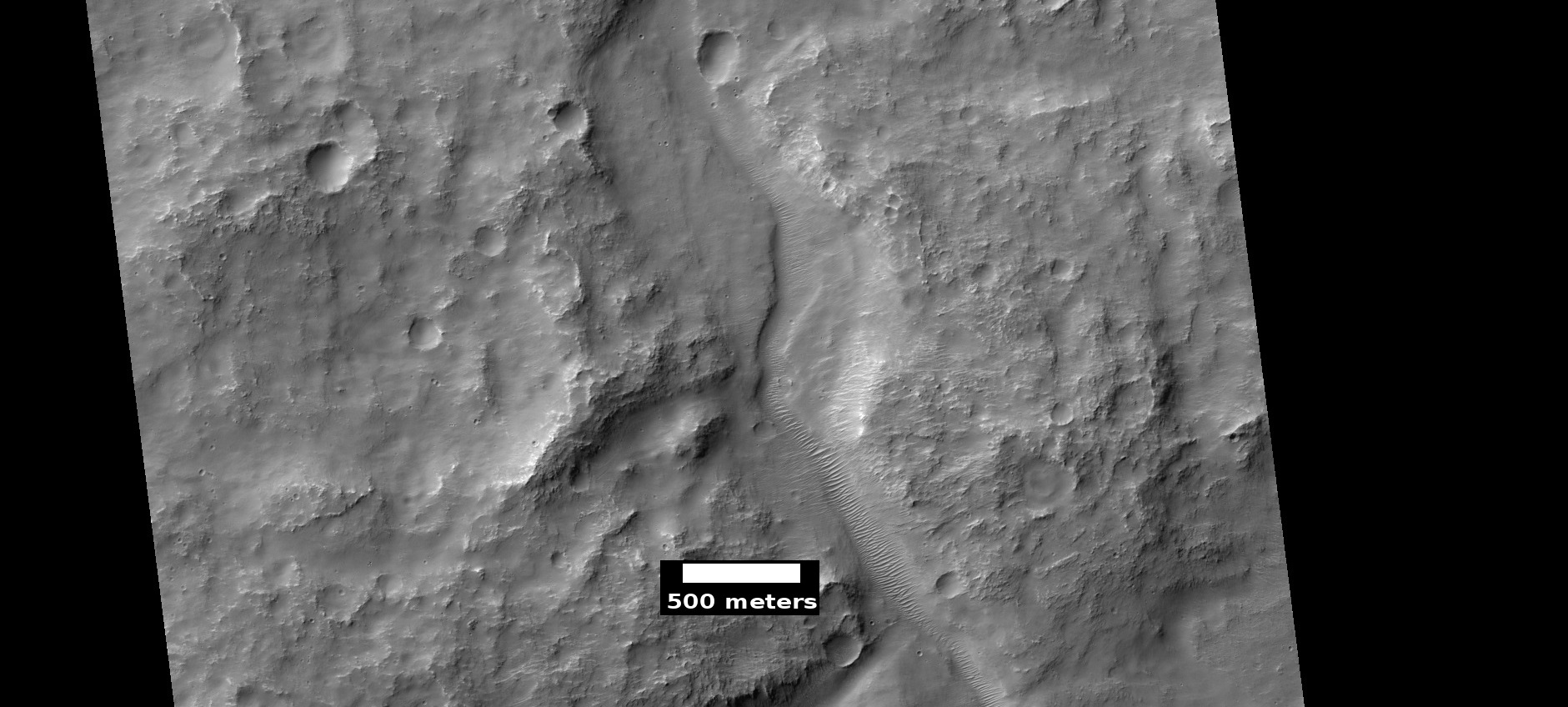
Channel within a larger channel, as seen by HiRISE under HiWish program

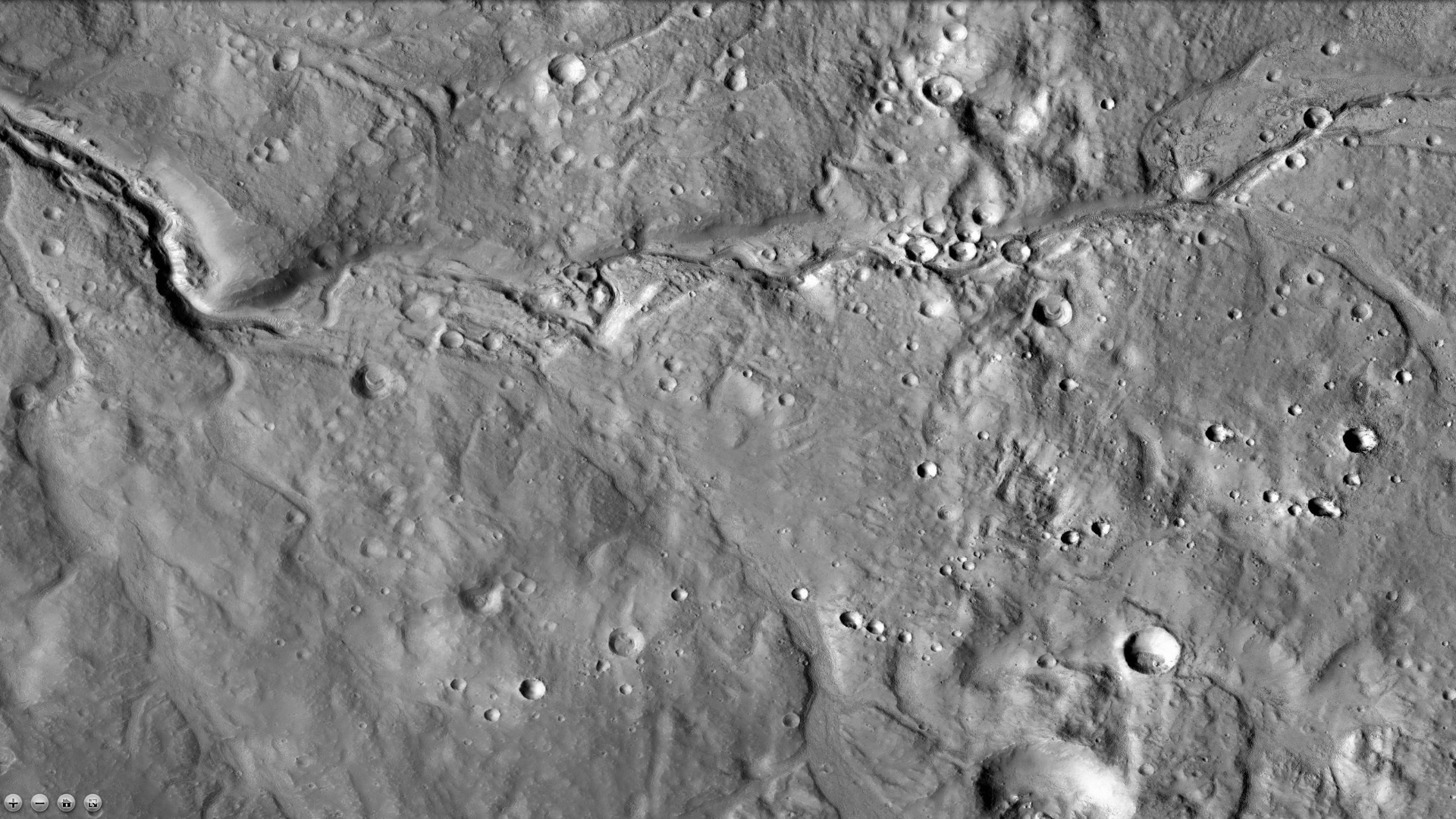
Channels in Arabia, as seen by CTX This channel winds along for a good distance and has branches. It ends in a depression that may have been a lake at one time.

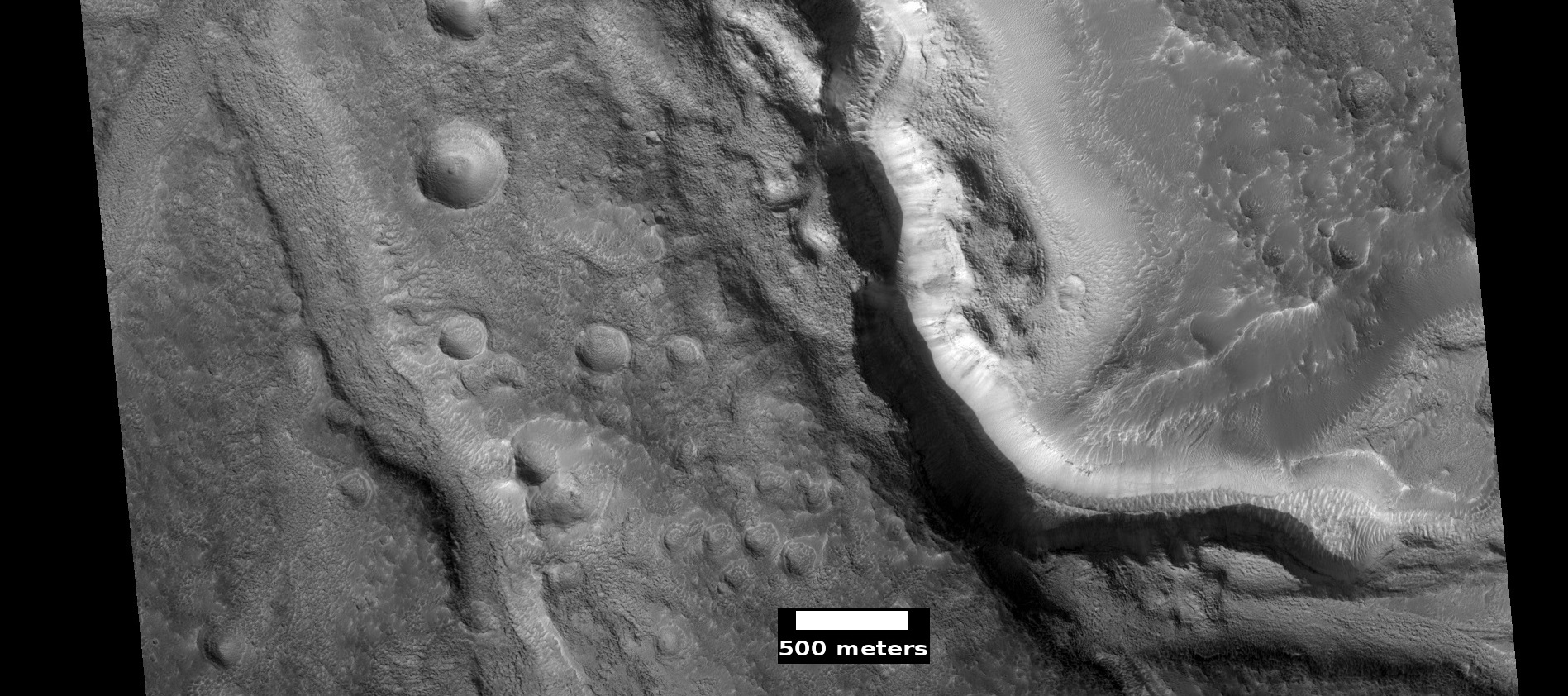
Channel in Arabia, as seen by HiRISE under HiWish program. This is an enlargement of the previous image that was taken with CTX to give a wide view.

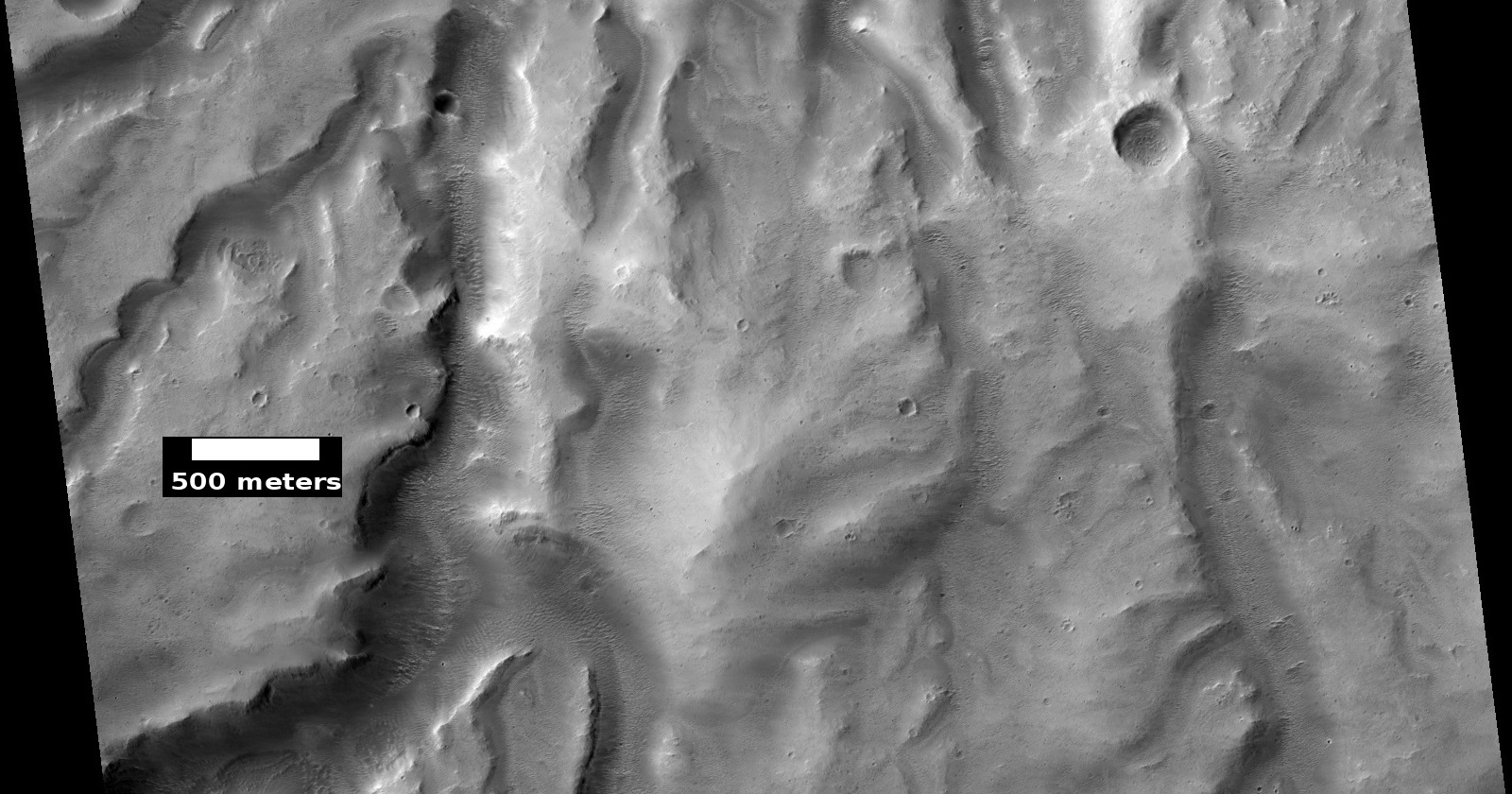
Channels in Sklodowska Crater, as seen by HiRISE under the HiWish program.

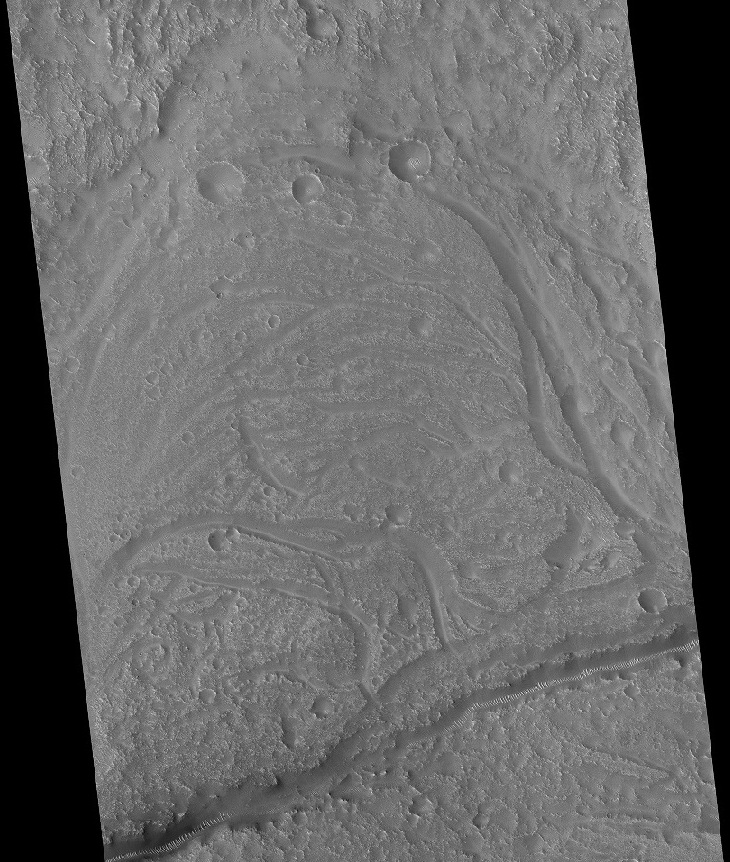
Stream meander and cutoff, as seen by HiRISE under HiWish program. These kind of fearures usually take a long time to form. Hence, this photo suggests that water may have flowed here for some time--rather than for a quick flood.

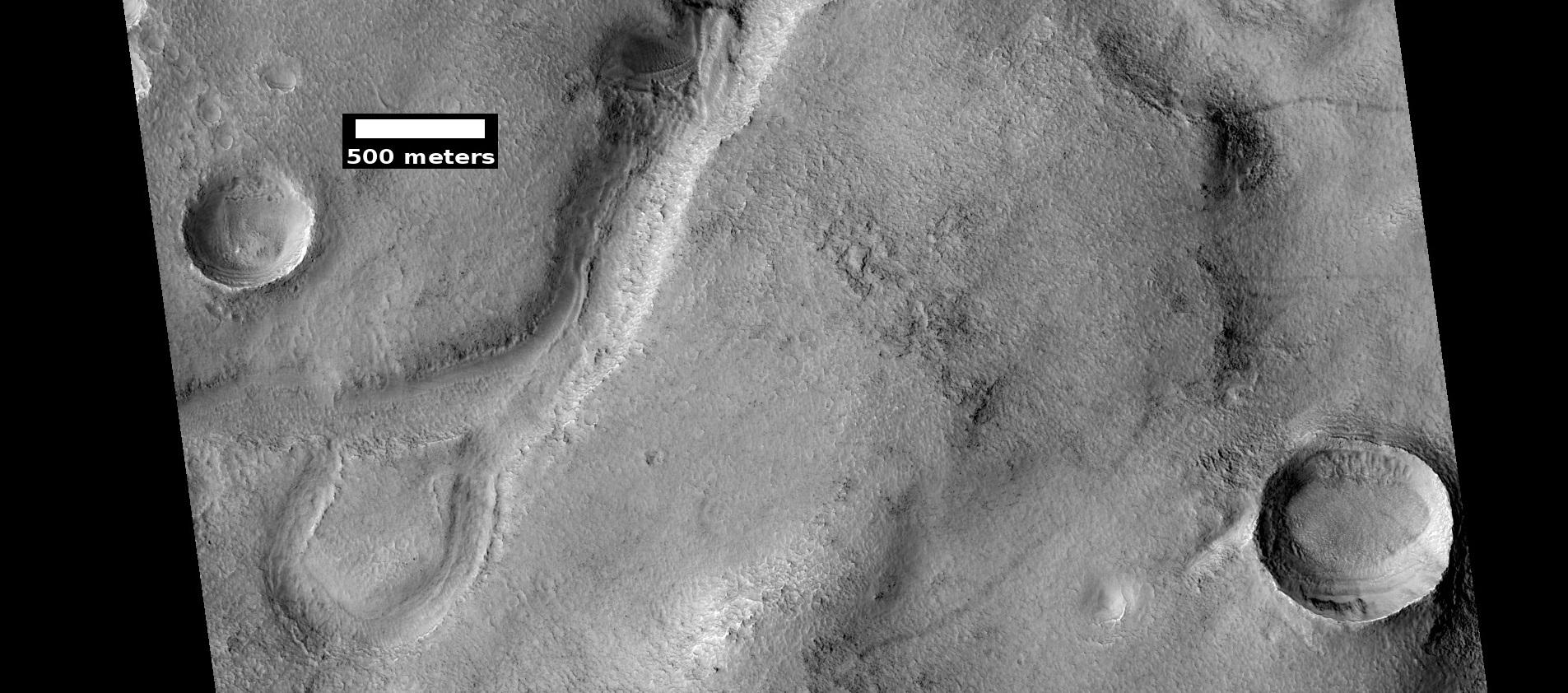
Oxbow lake, as seen by HiRISE under HiWish program.

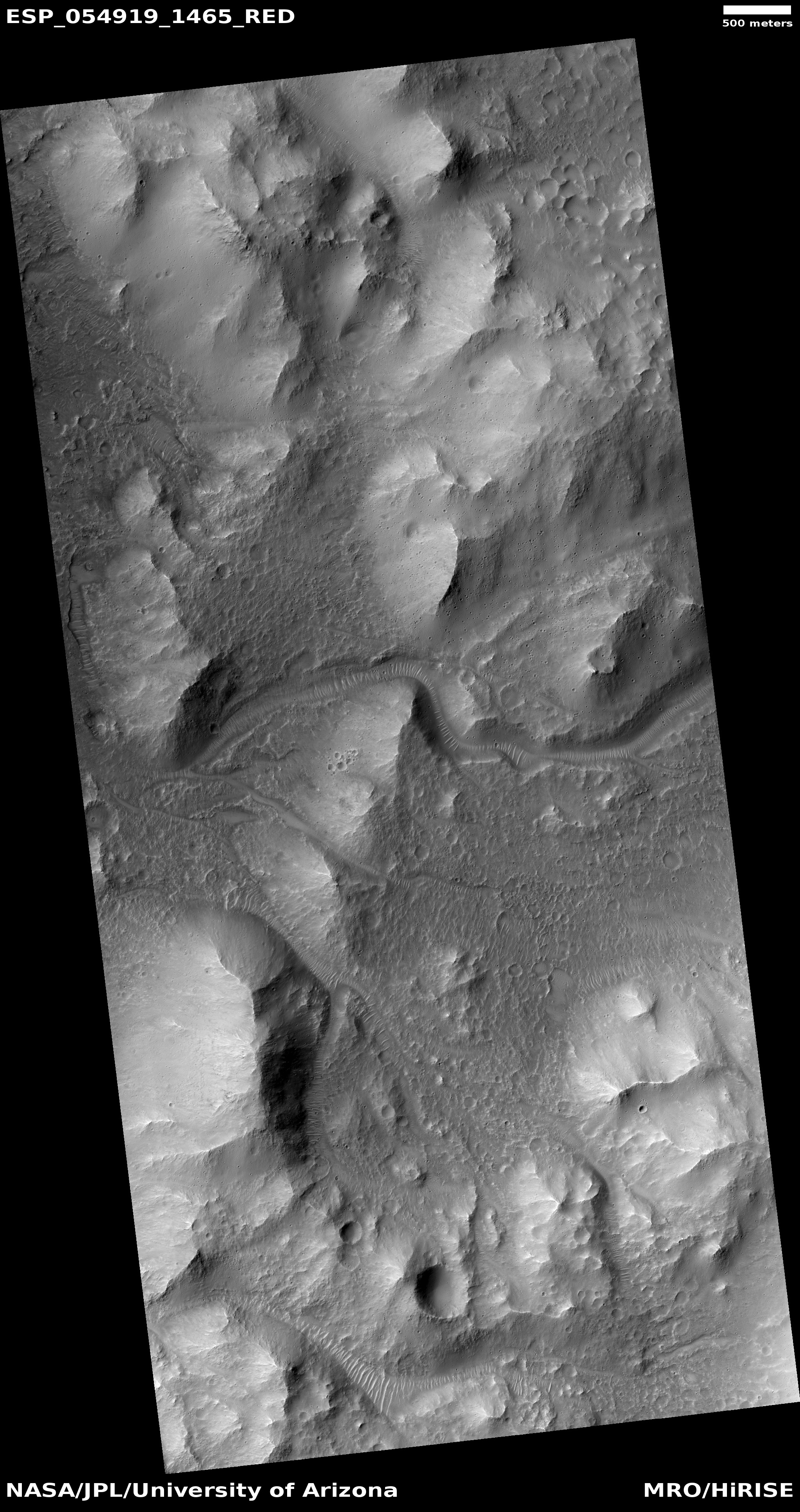
Channel, as seen by HiRISE under HiWish program Notice how the stream has cut through some rather thick terrain in places.

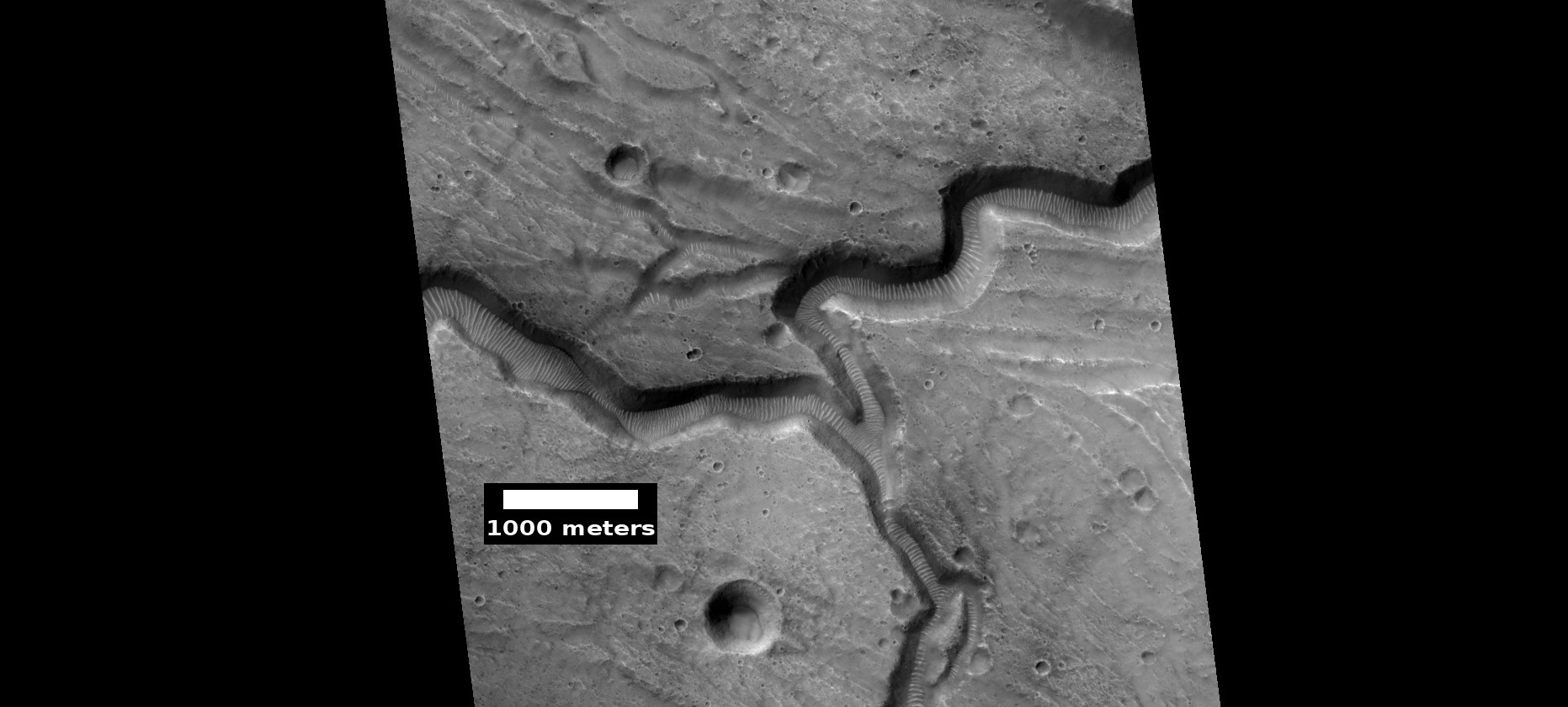
Valleys as seen by HiRISE under HiWish program

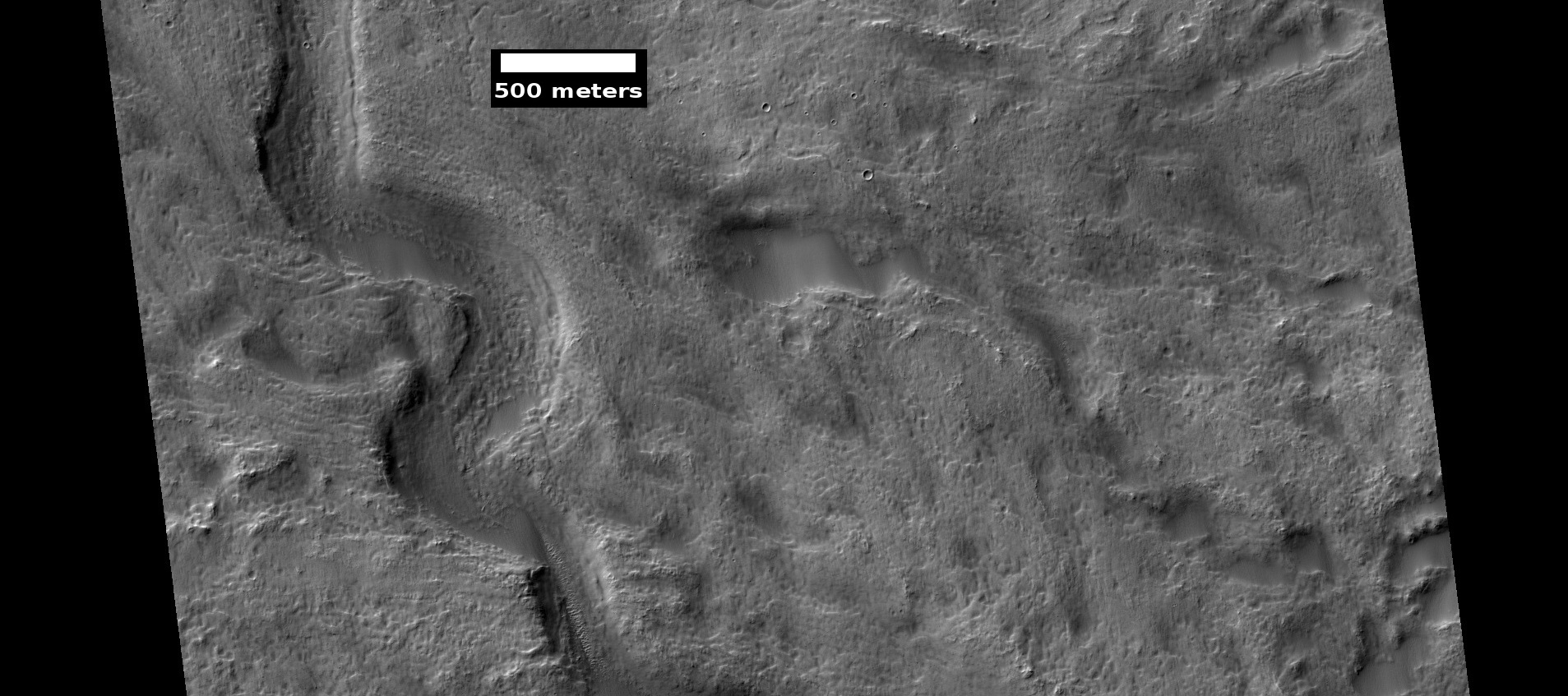
Channel on floor of Newton Crater, as seen by HiRISE under HiWish program.

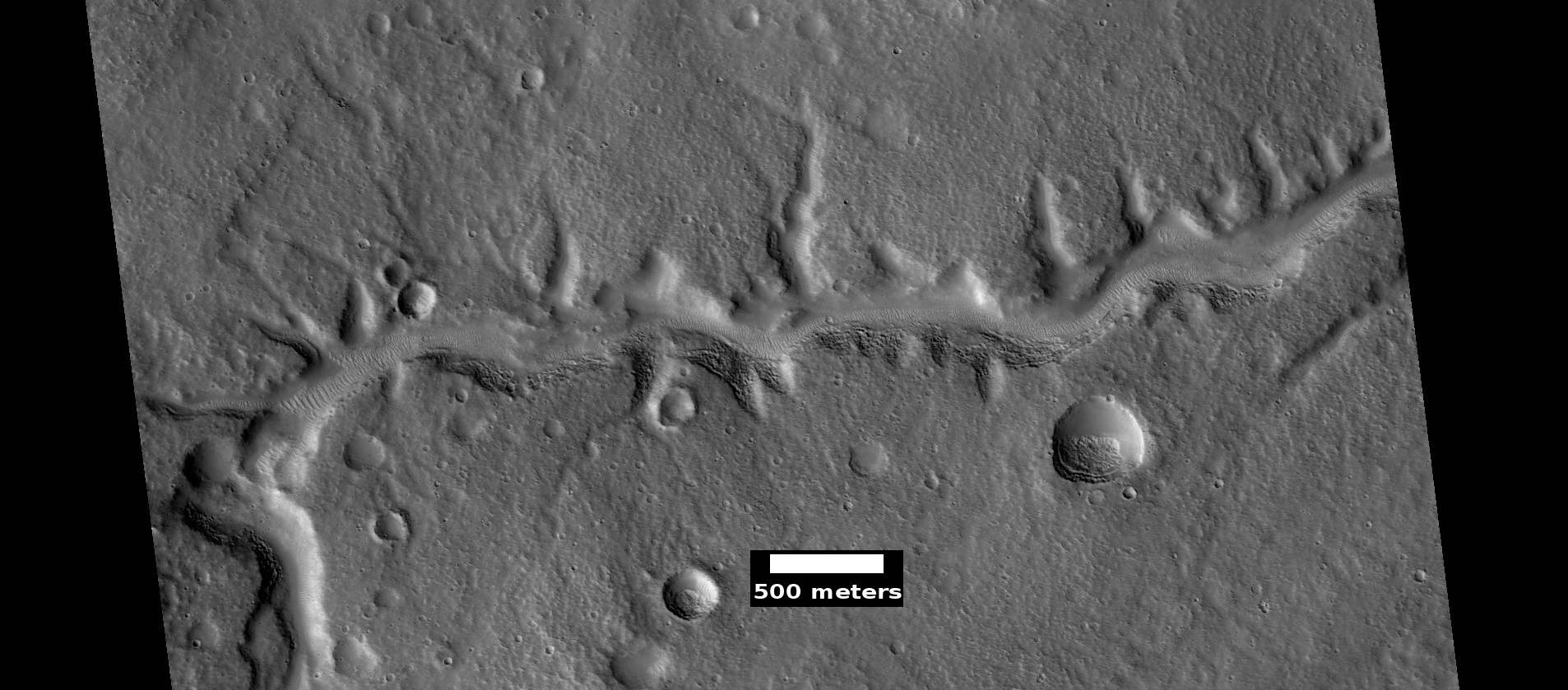
Branched channel, as seen by HiRISE under HiWish program.

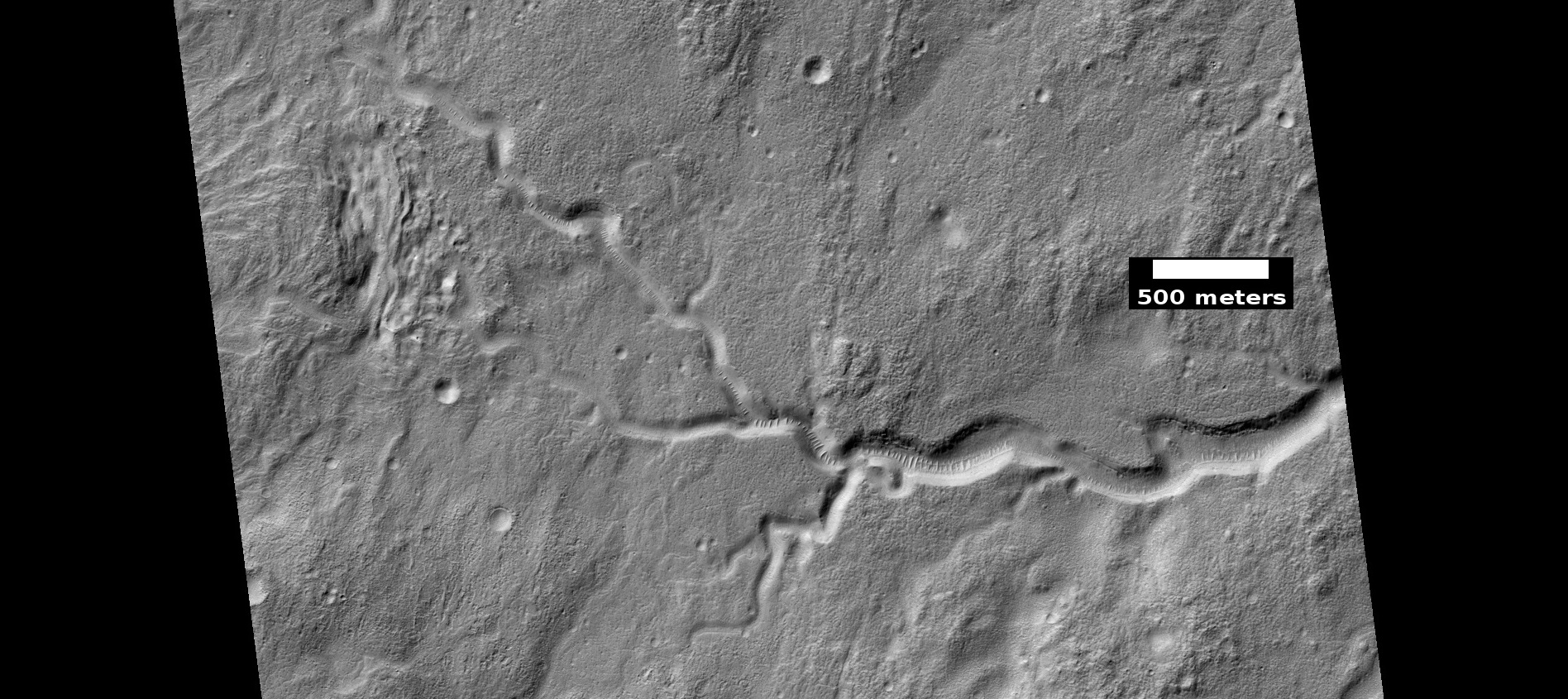
Branched channel, as seen by HiRISE under HiWish program.

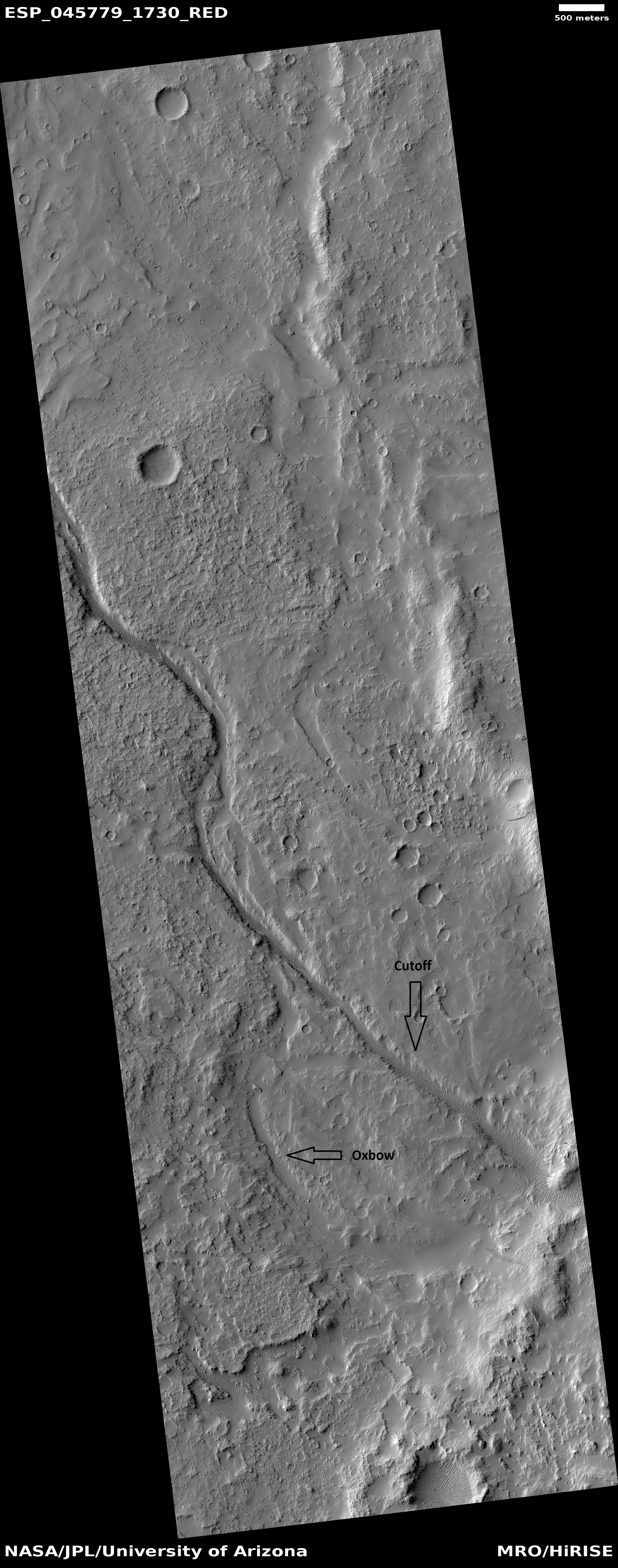
Channel showing an old oxbow and a cutoff, as seen by HiRISE under HiWish program. Location is Memnonia quadrangle.

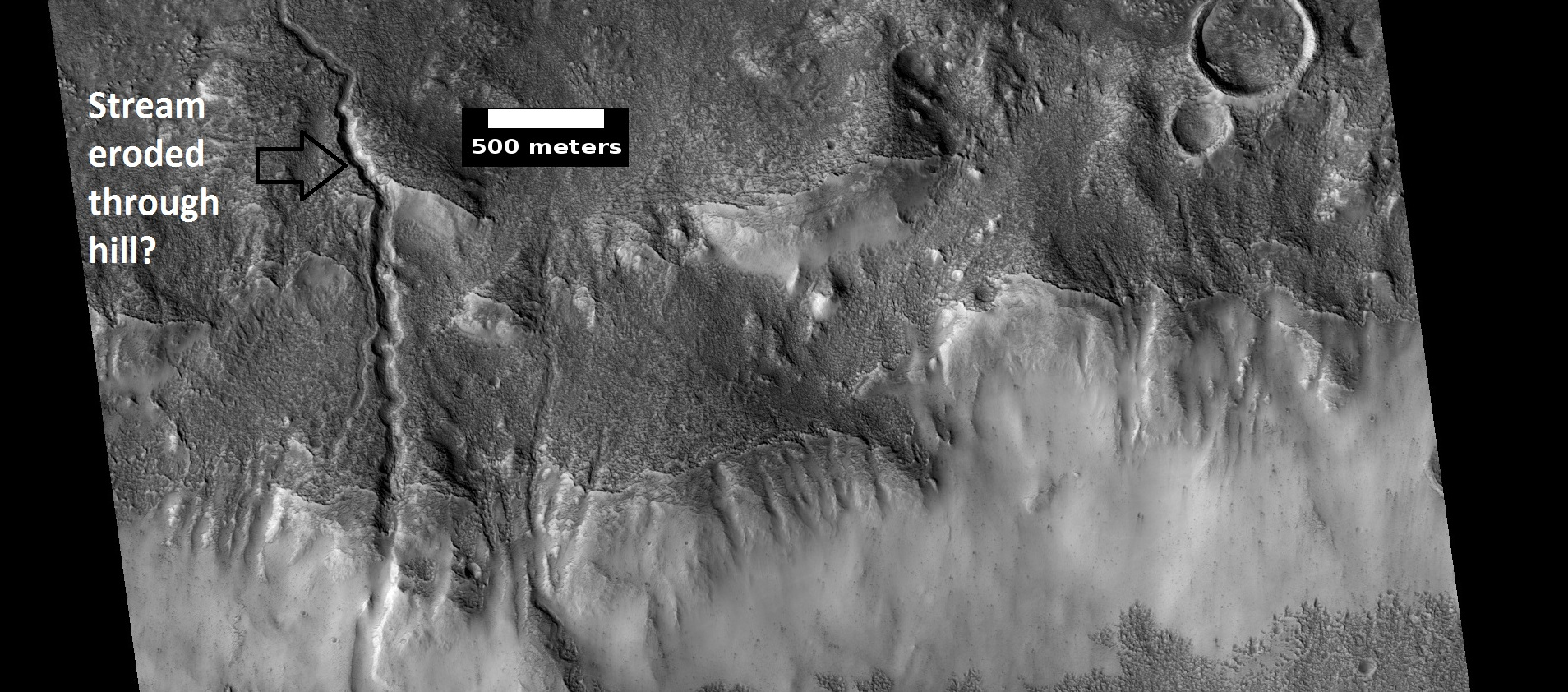
Channels, as seen by HiRISE under HiWish program. Stream appears to have eroded through a hill.

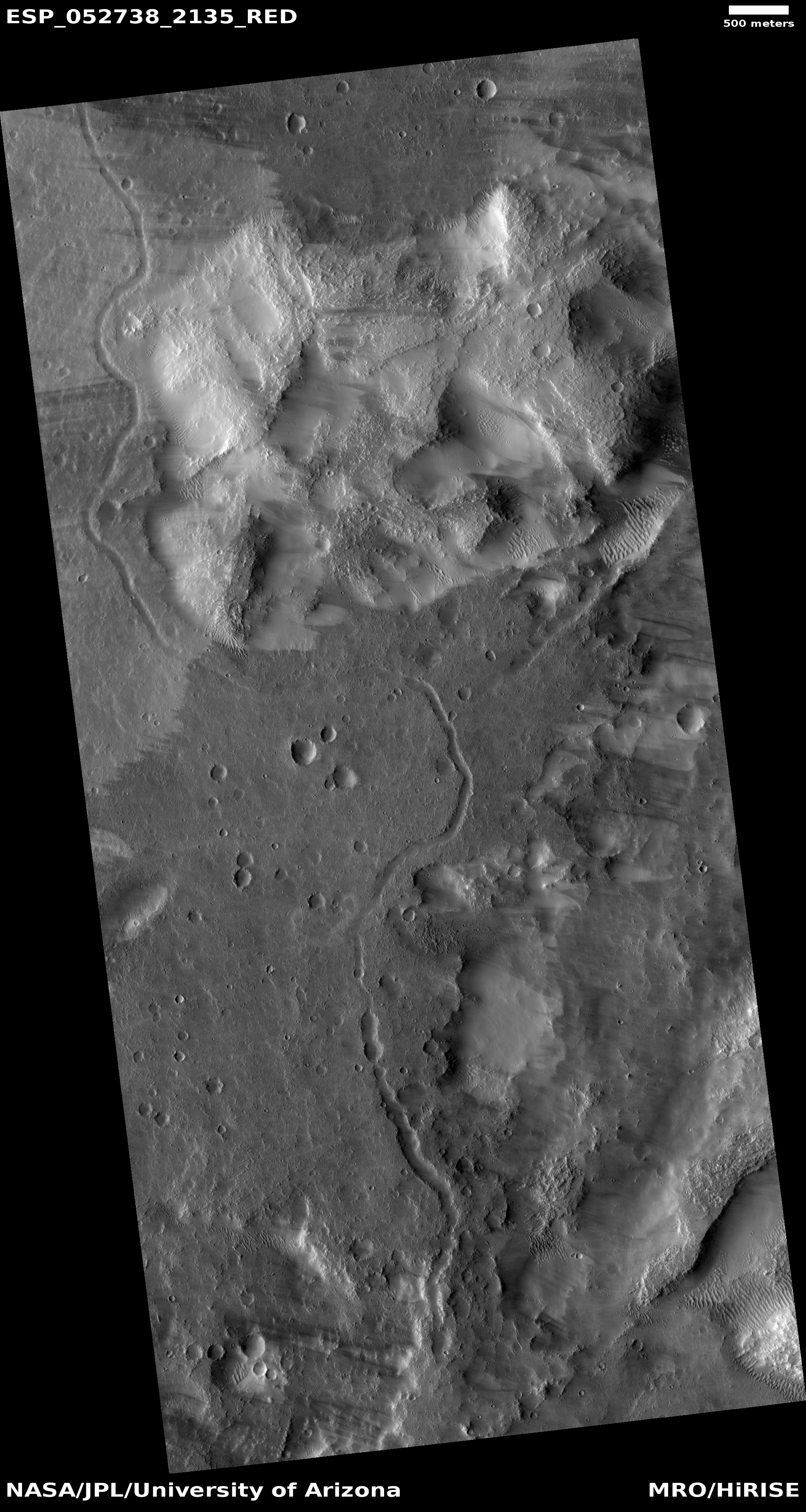
Channel, as seen by HiRISE under HiWish program Location is the Cebrenia quadrangle.

== Streamlined shapes ==
Streamlined shapes represent more evidence of past flowing water on Mars. Water shaped features into streamlined shapes. These shapes were probably made by great floods. Parts of Mars look like the ground has collapsed and allowed water to quickly erupt. The more pointed part of each shape points in the direction the water moved.

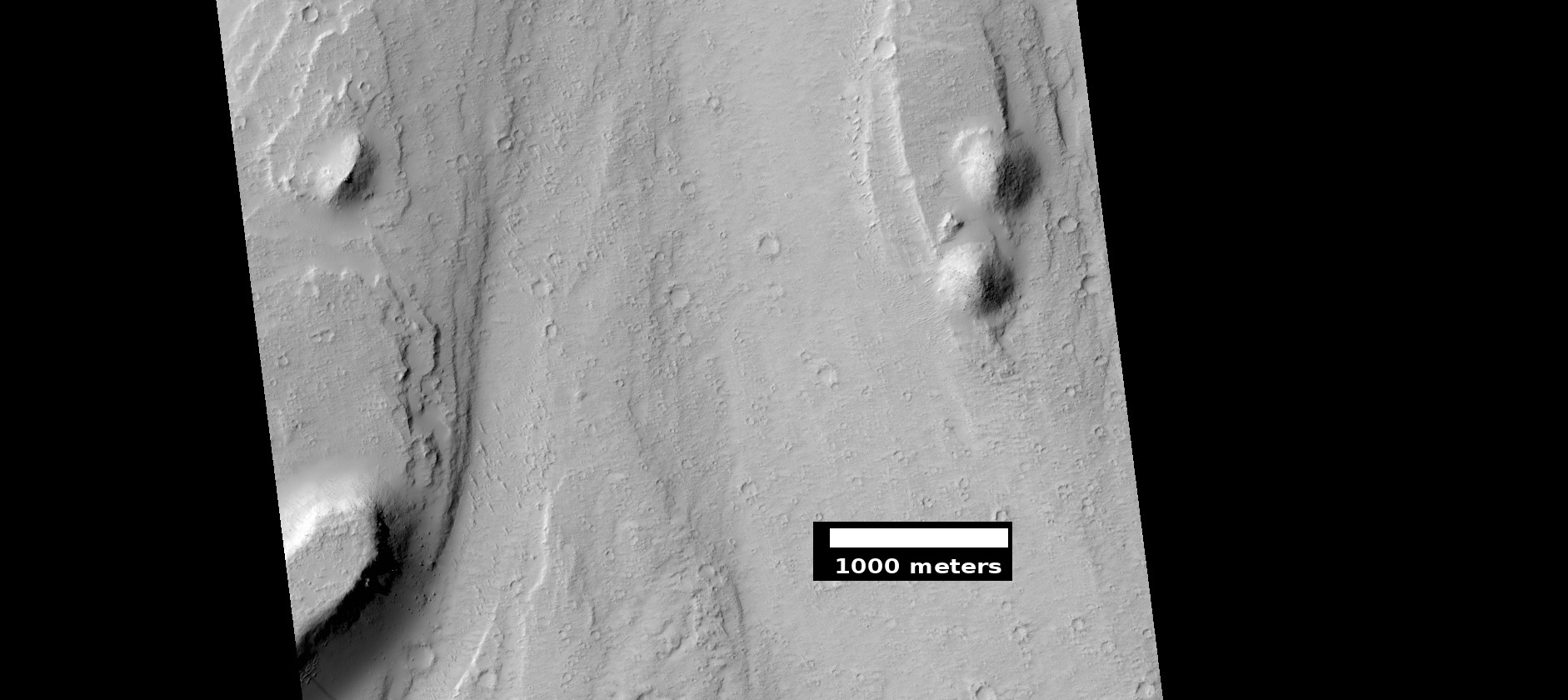
Streamlined feature, as seen by HiRISE under HiWish program Location is Memnonia quadrangle.
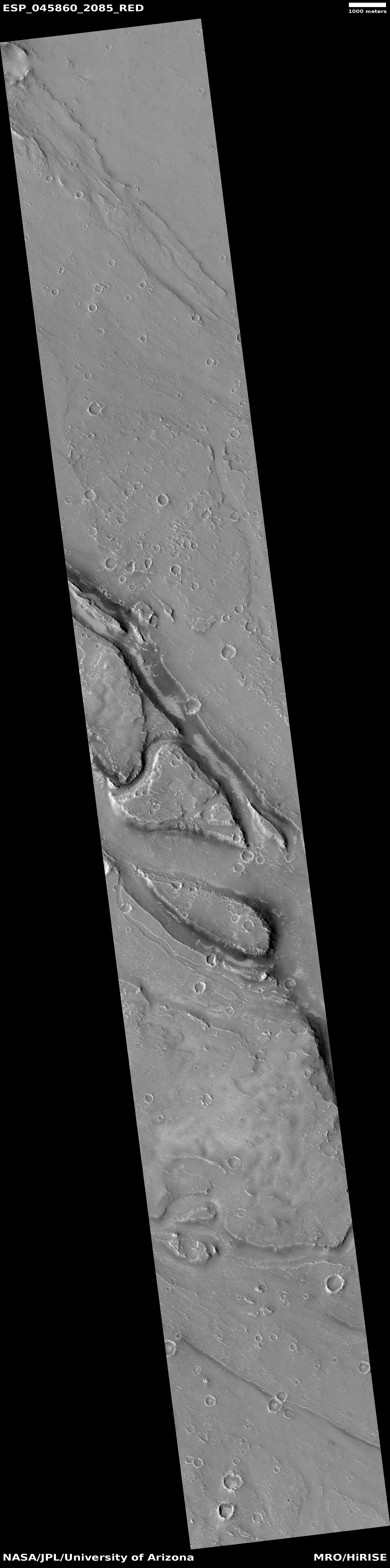
Wide view of streamlined shapes in Amenthes quadrangle, as seen by HiRISE under HiWish program

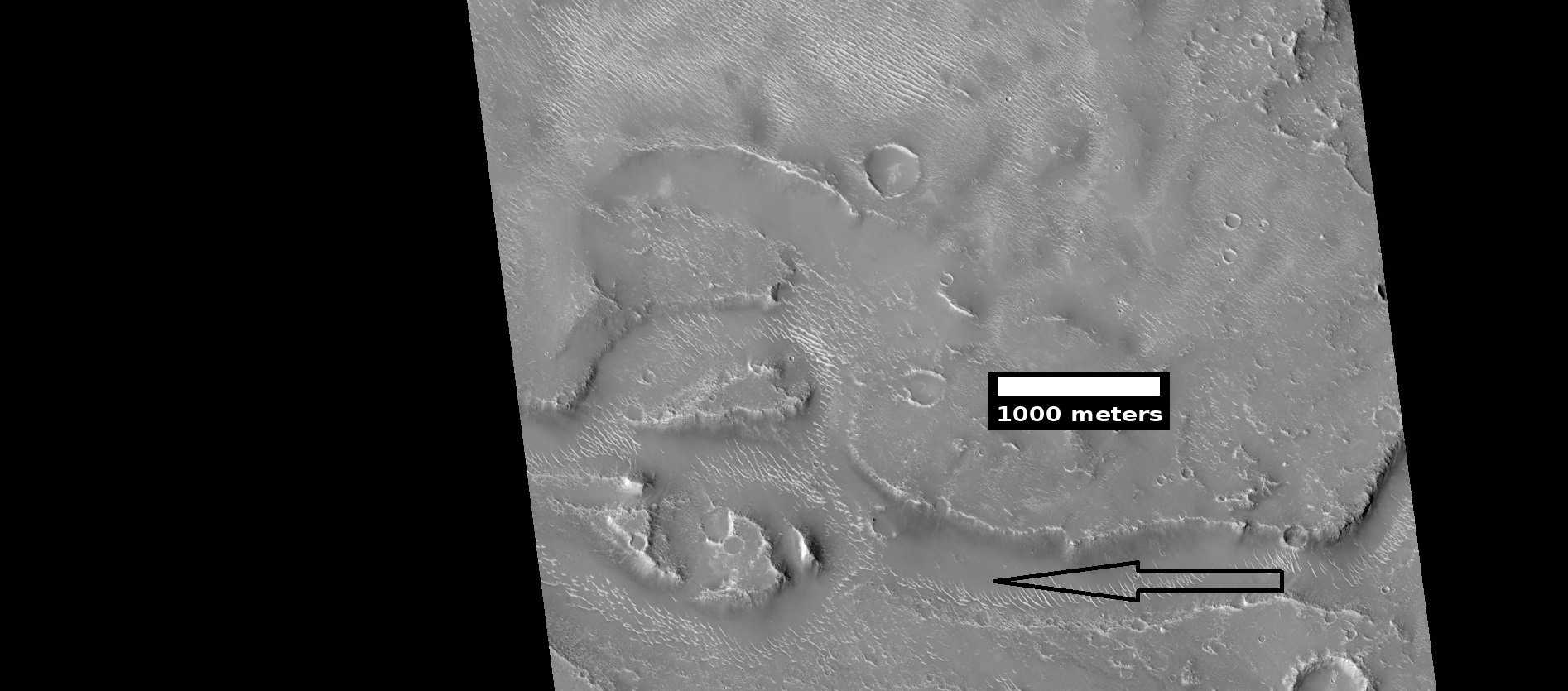
Close view of streamlined shapes, as seen by HiRISE under HiWish program Arrow indicates the direction of past flowing water.

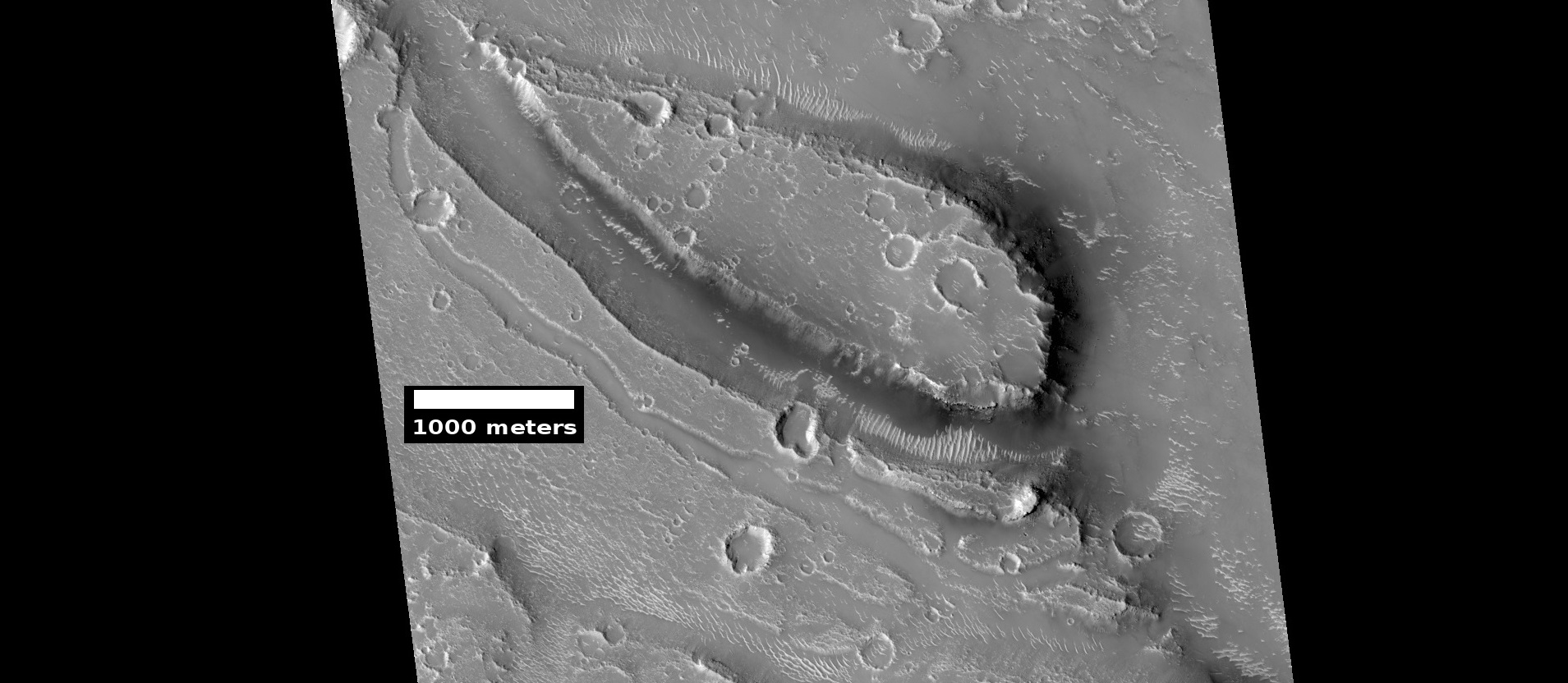
Close view of streamlined shapes, as seen by HiRISE under HiWish program

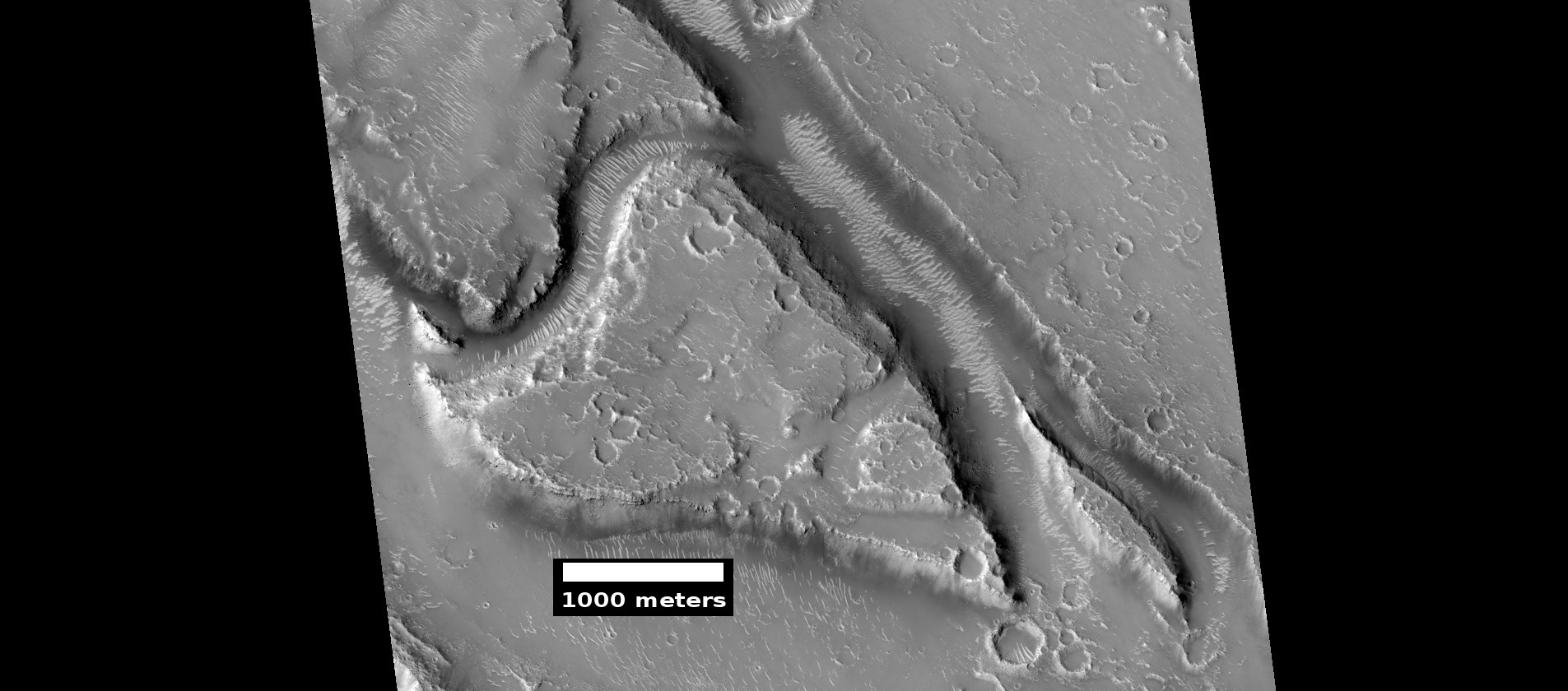
Close view of streamlined shapes, as seen by HiRISE under HiWish program

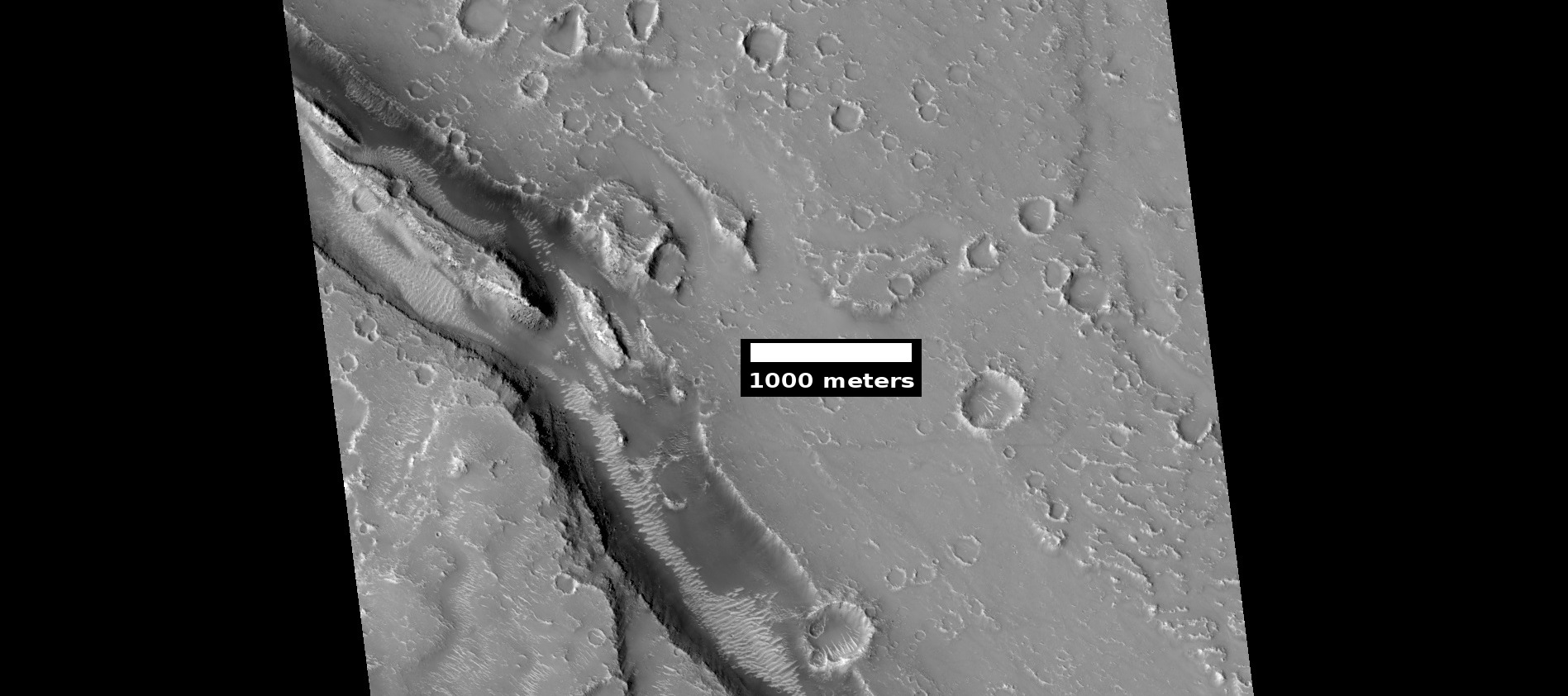
Close view of streamlined shapes, as seen by HiRISE under HiWish program

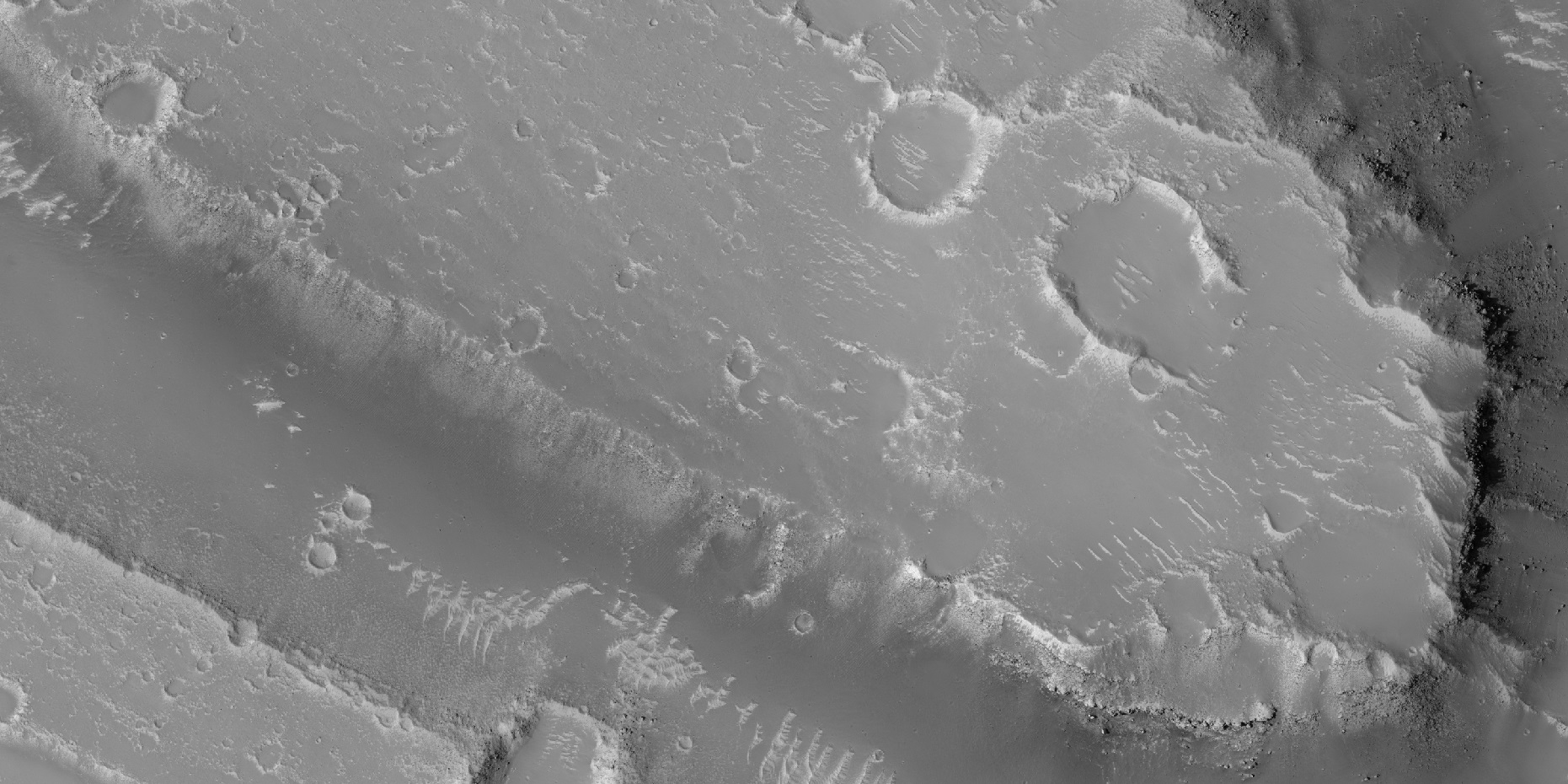
Close view of streamlined shape, as seen by HiRISE under HiWish program

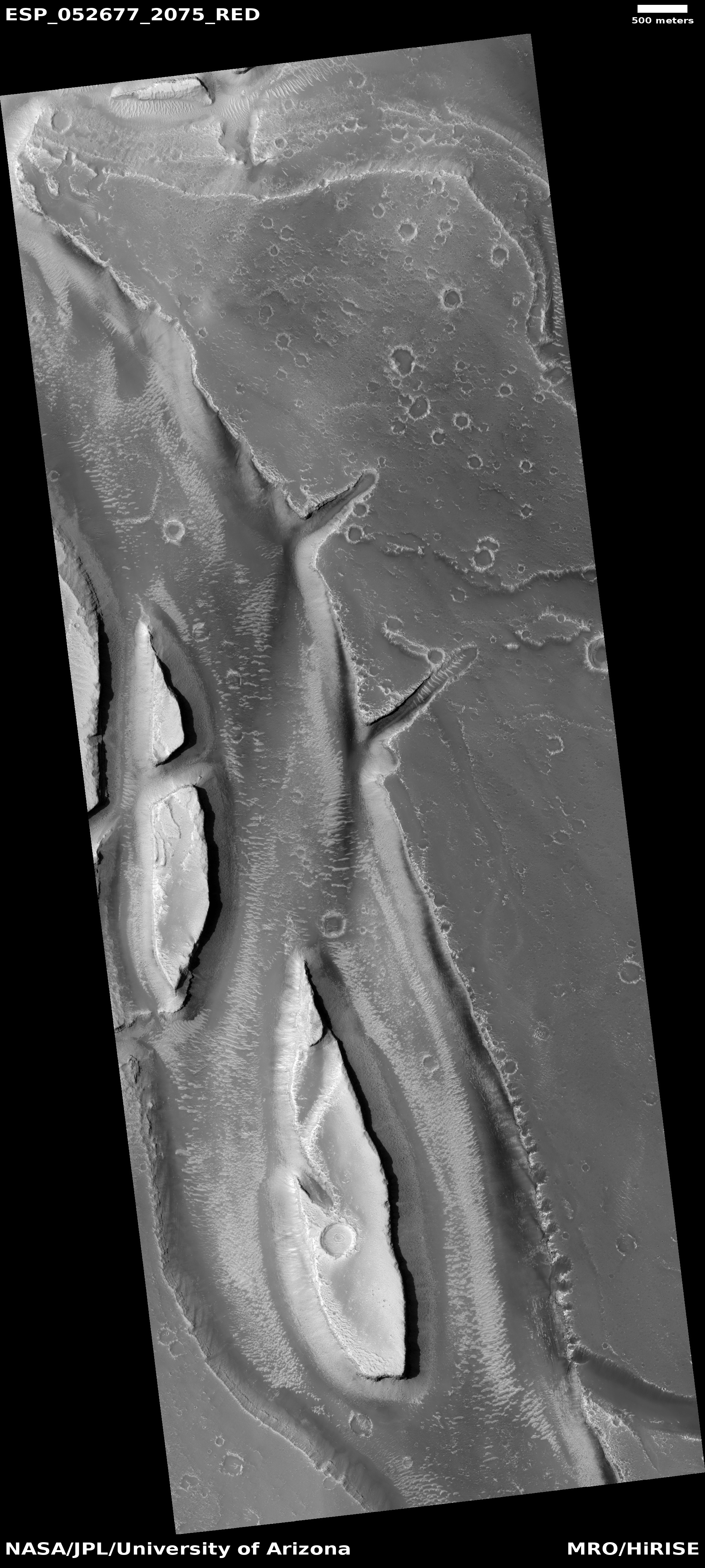
Streamlined shapes, as seen by HiRISE under HiWish program Location is the Elysium quadrangle.

== Deltas ==
Deltas form when running water enters a large body of water and slows. When moving water slows, it drops its load the sediment. Finding deltas is evidence of large bodies of water like lakes.

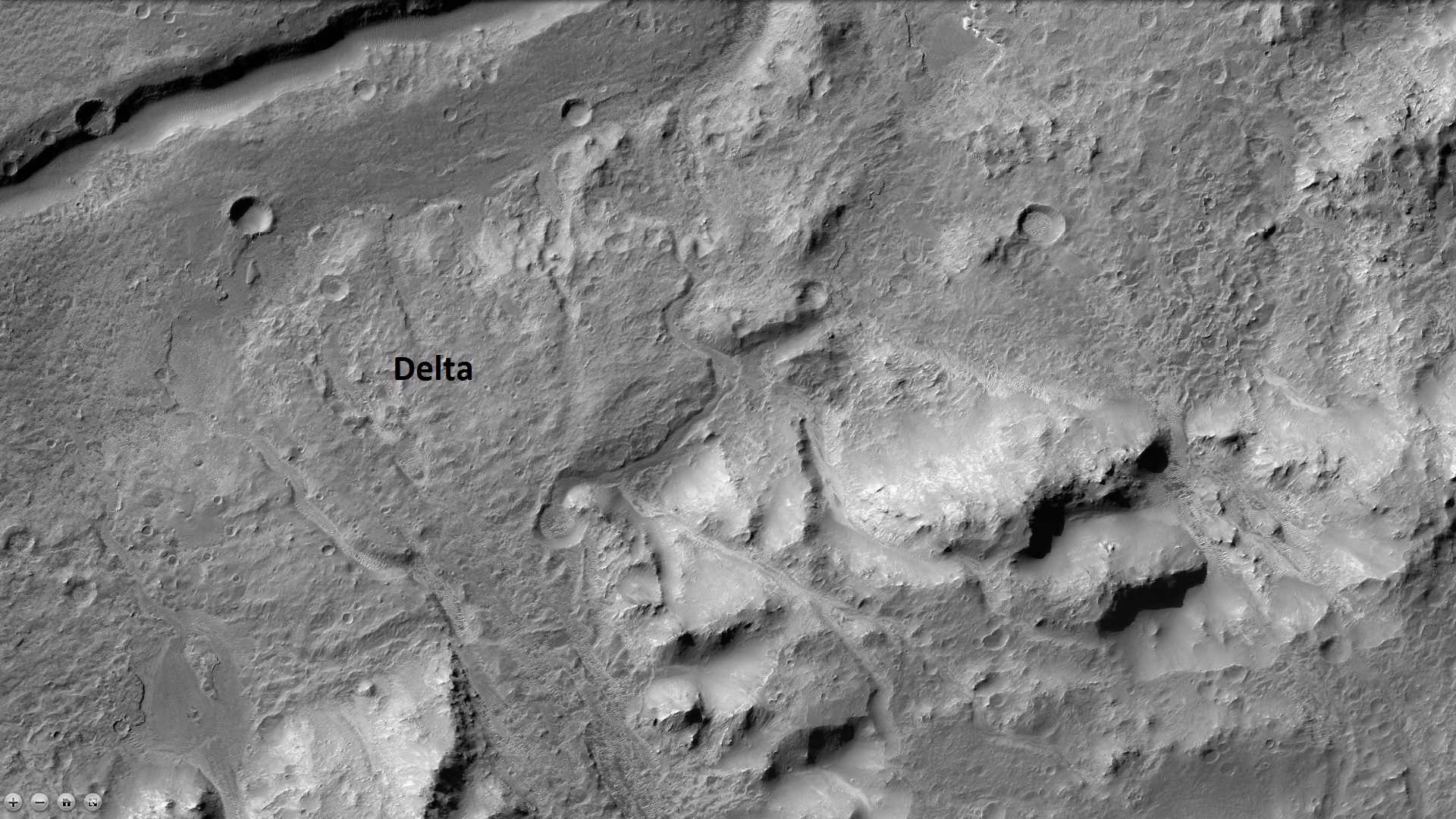
Wide view of a delta in Holden Crater, as seen by CTX

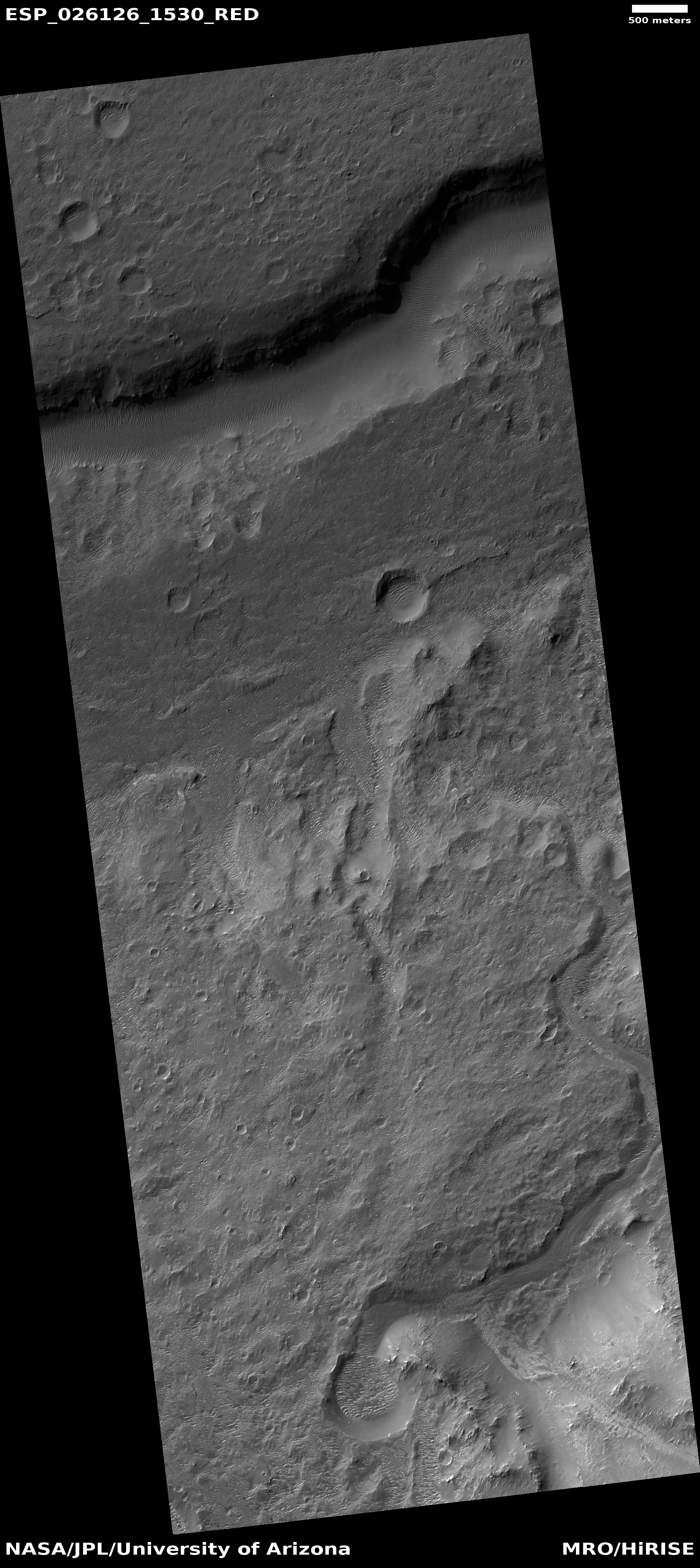
Part of delta, as seen by HiRISE under HiWish program Note: this is a portion of the previous CTX image.

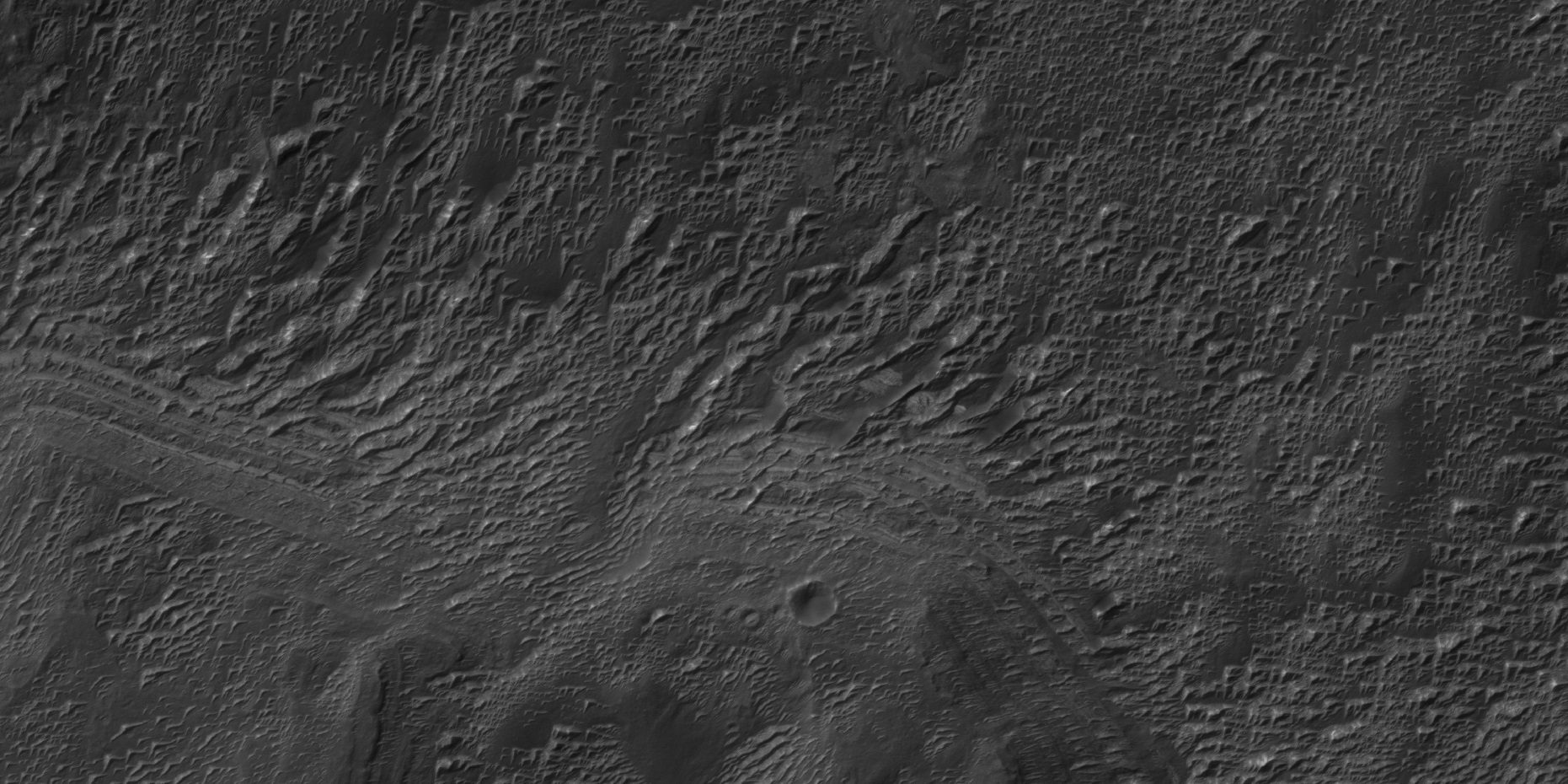
Close view of previous image showing layers, as seen by HiRISE under HiWish program and enlarged with HiView

== Pedestal crater ==
Pedestal craters are believed to be caused by a crater's ejecta protecting the material beneath it from eroding. The underlying material is probably ice-rich; hence these craters indicate where and how much ice was present in the ground.

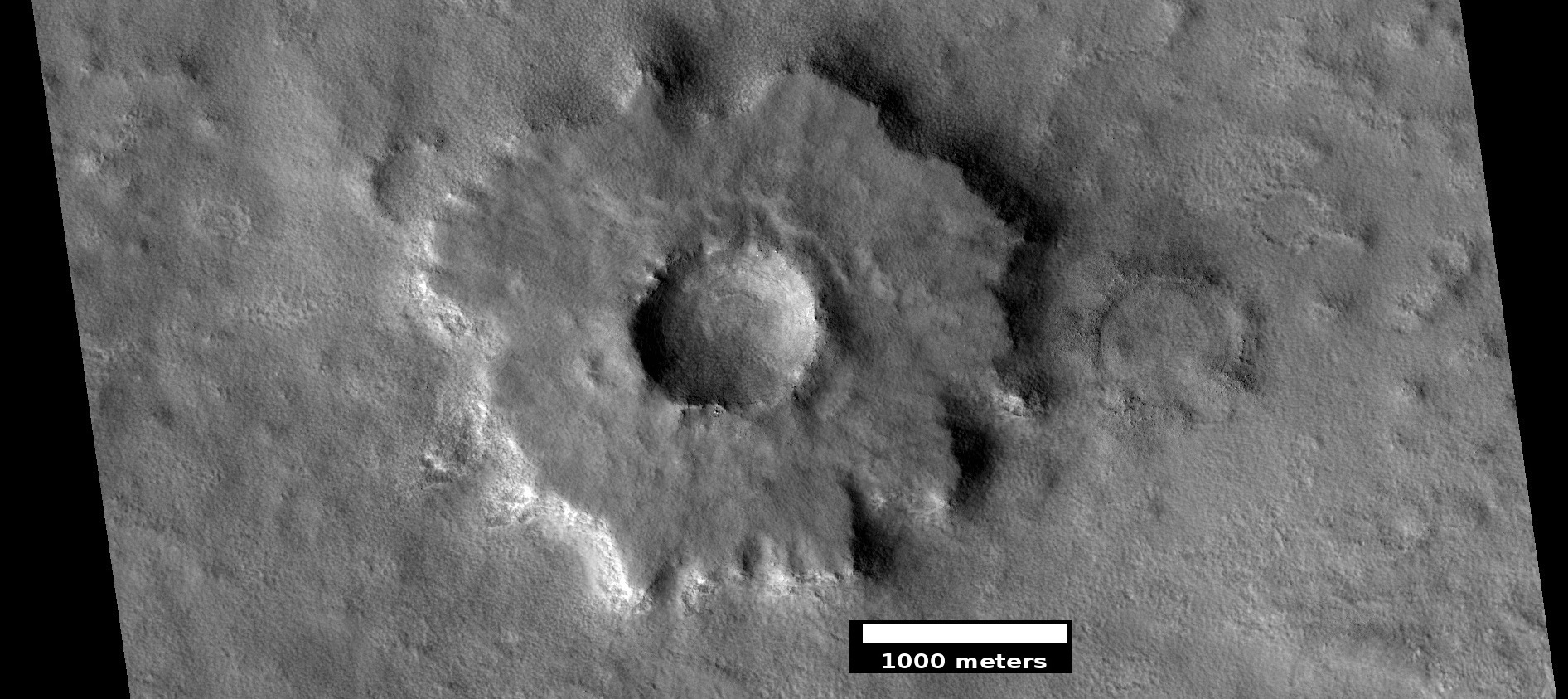
Pedestal crater, as seen by HiRISE under HiWish program. Top layer has protected the lower material from being eroded.

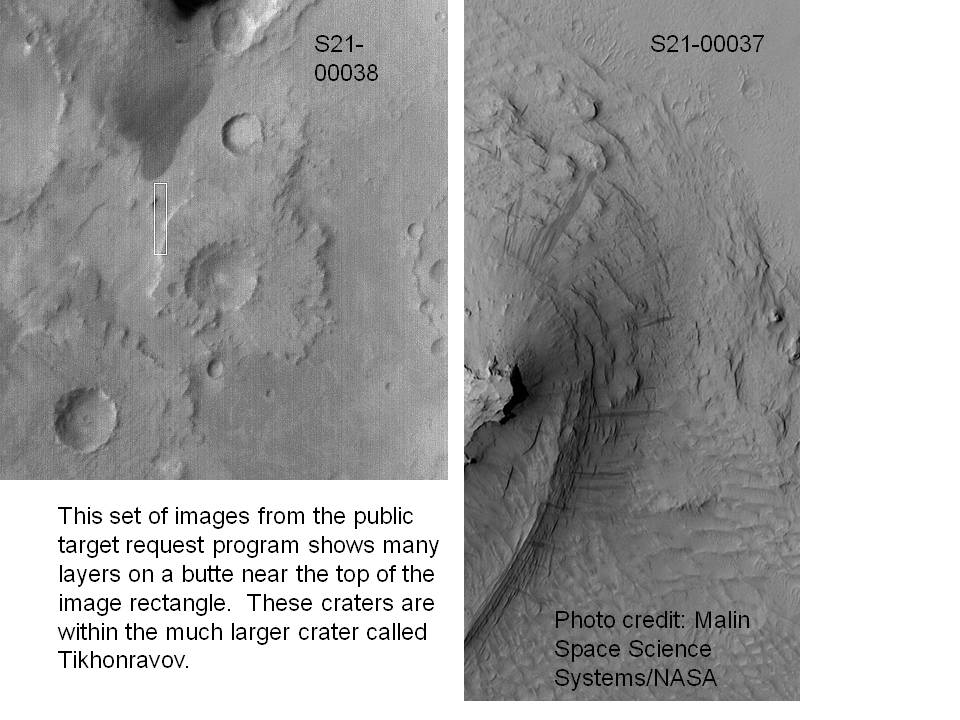
Pedestal craters and layers in Tikhonravov Crater in Arabia, as seen by Mars Global Surveyor (MGS), under the MOC Public Targeting Program. Layers may form from volcanoes, the wind, or by deposition under water. Some researchers believe this crater once held a massive lake.

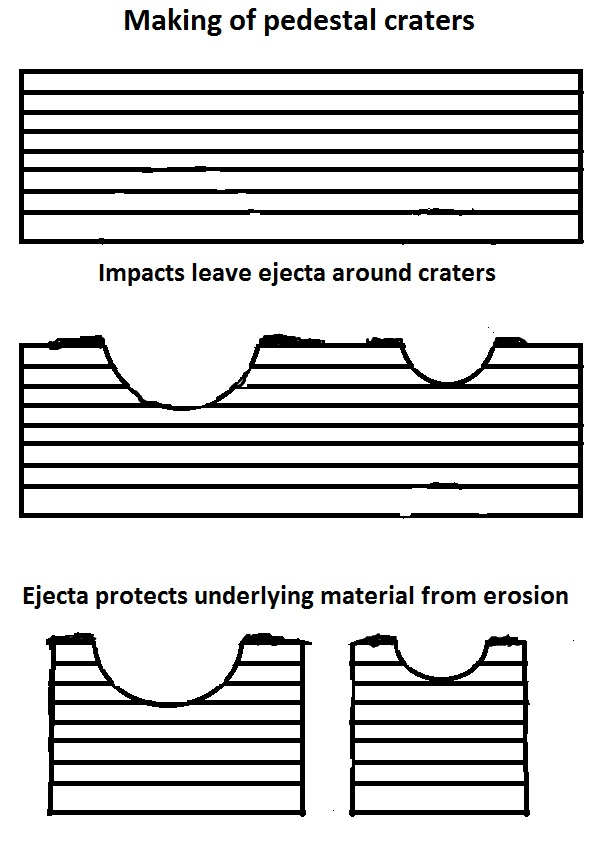
Pedestal craters form when the ejecta from impacts protect the underlying material from erosion. As a result of this process, craters appear perched above their surroundings.

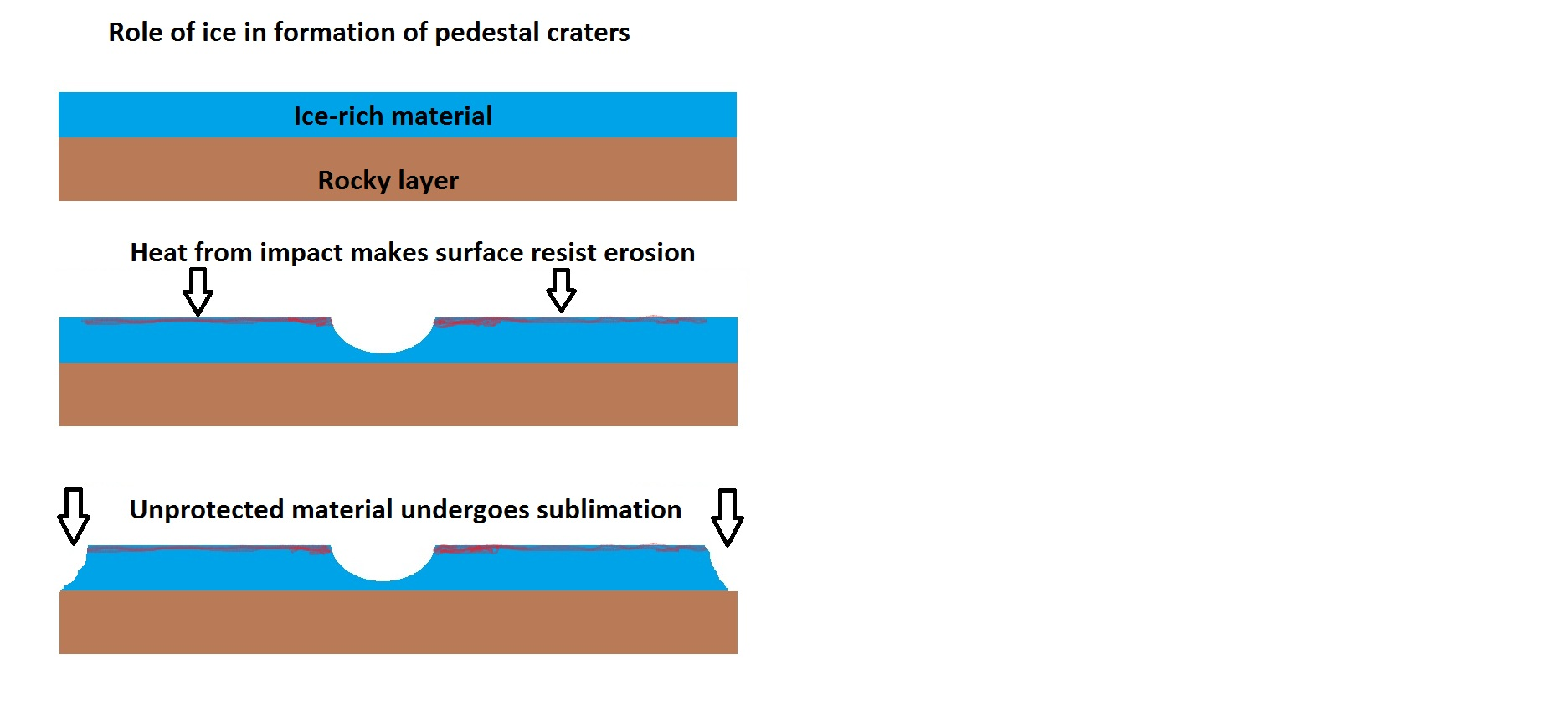
Drawing shows a later idea of how some pedestal craters form. In this way of thinking, an impacting projectile goes into an ice-rich layer—but no further. Heat and wind from the impact hardens the surface against erosion. This hardening can be accomplished by the melting of ice which produces a salt/mineral solution thereby cementing the surface.

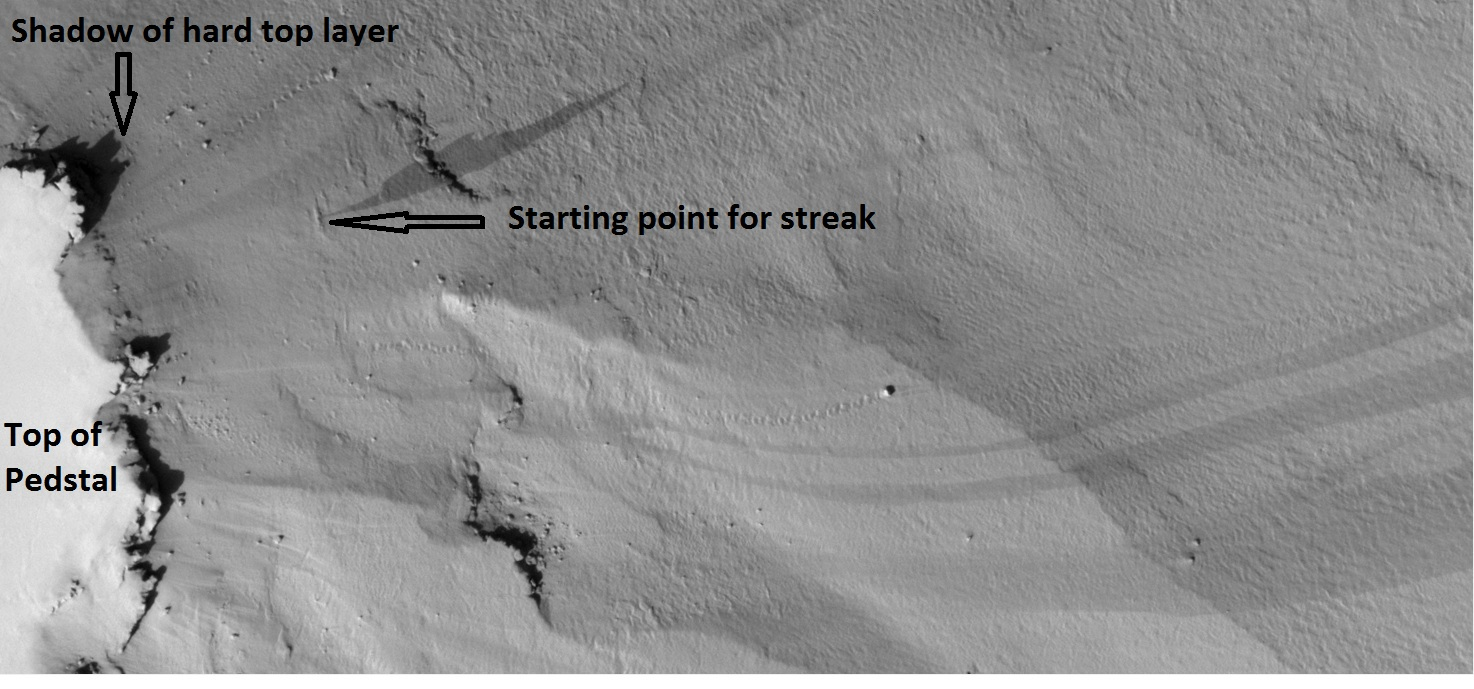
Dark slope streaks near the top of a pedestal crater, as seen by HiRISE under the HiWish program. Note in the middle of the picture, one can see the track of a boulder that rolled down a slope.

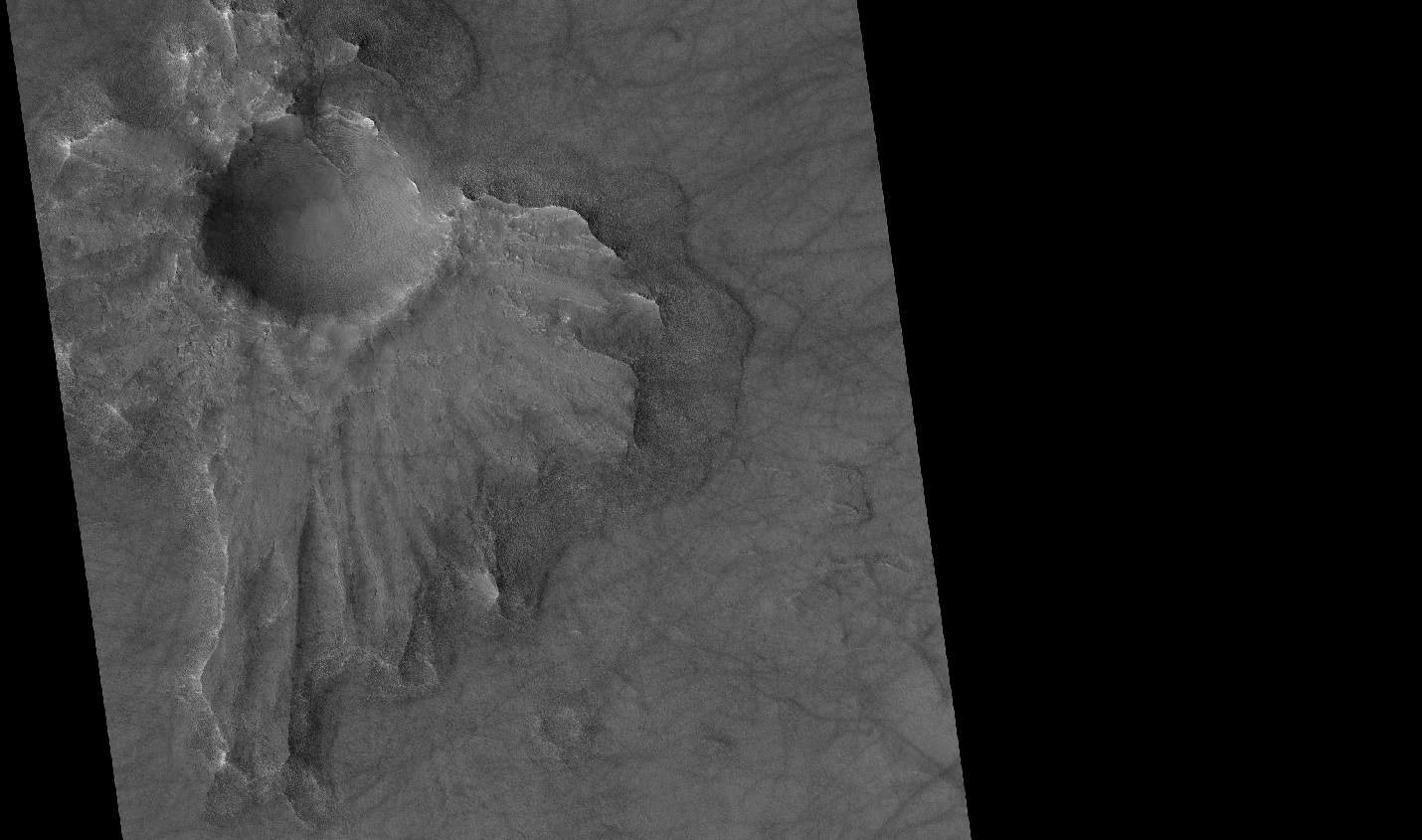
Pedestal crater, as seen by HiRISE under HiWish program The ejecta is not symmetrical around crater because the asteroid came at a low angle out of the North East. The ejecta protected the underlying material from erosion; hence the crater looks elevated. The location is Casius quadrangle.

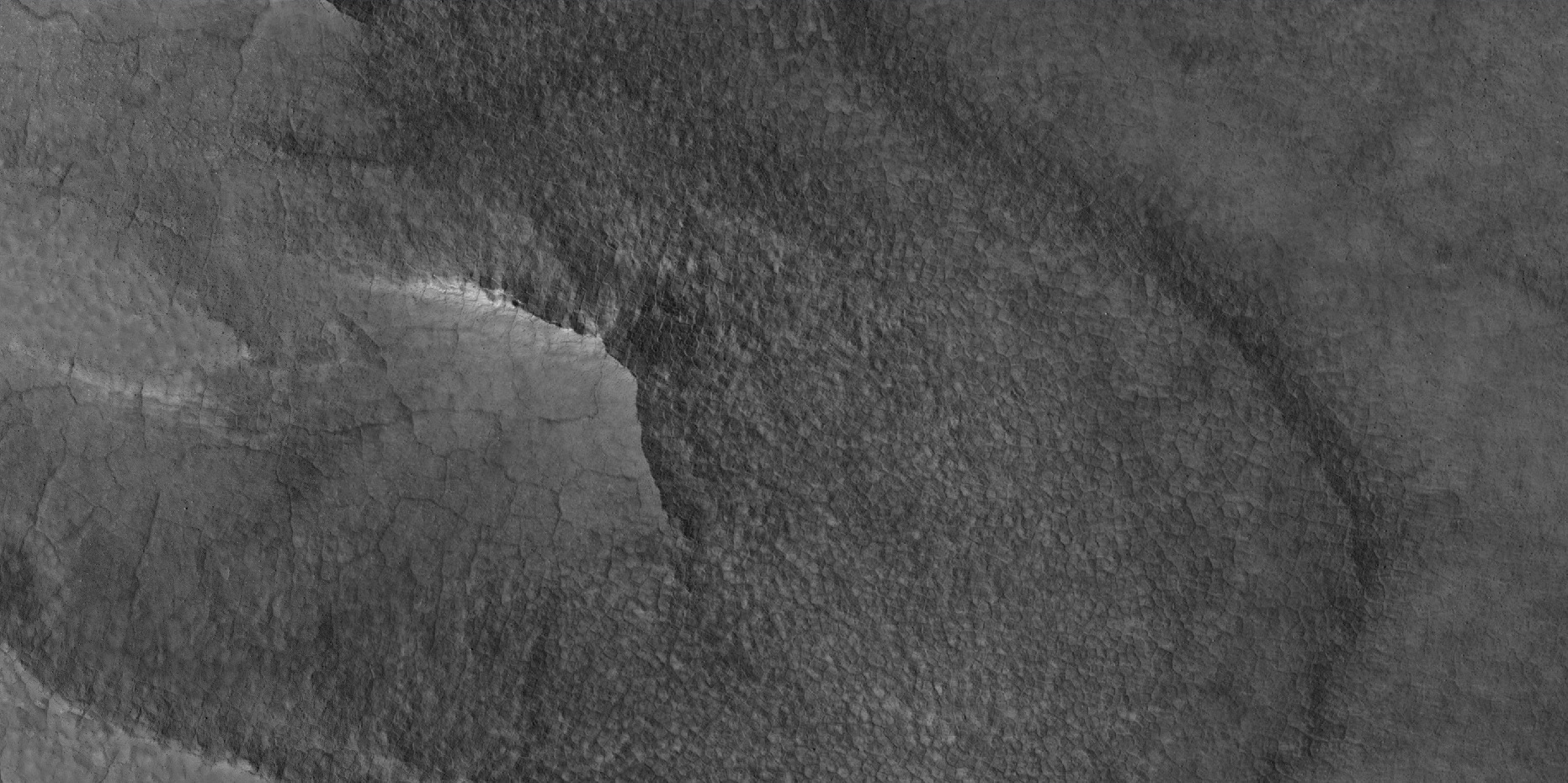
Close-up of East side (right side) of previous image of pedestal crater showing polygons on lobe. Since the margin of the crater has lobes and polygons, it is believed there is ice under the protective top. Picture taken with HiRISE under HiWish program. Note: this is an enlargement of the previous image.

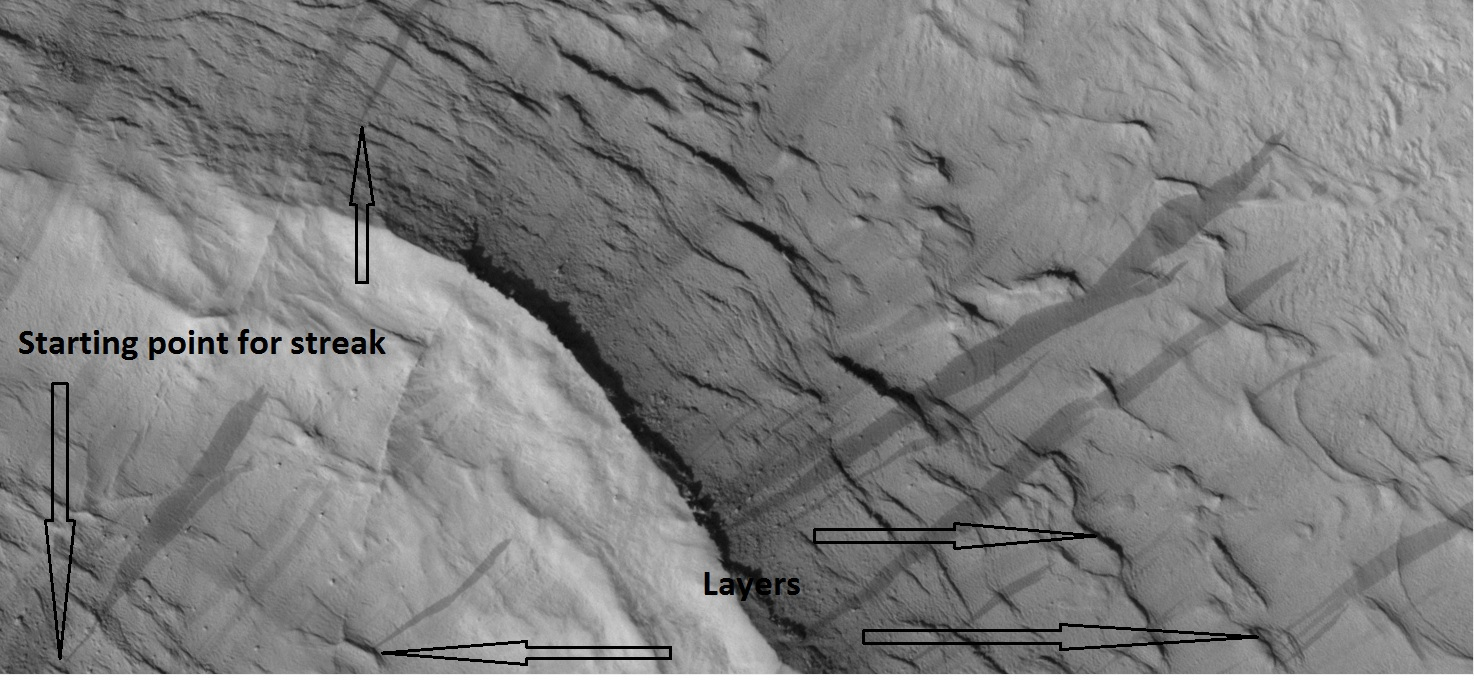
Dark slope streaks and layers near a pedestal crater, as seen by HiRISE under the HiWish program.

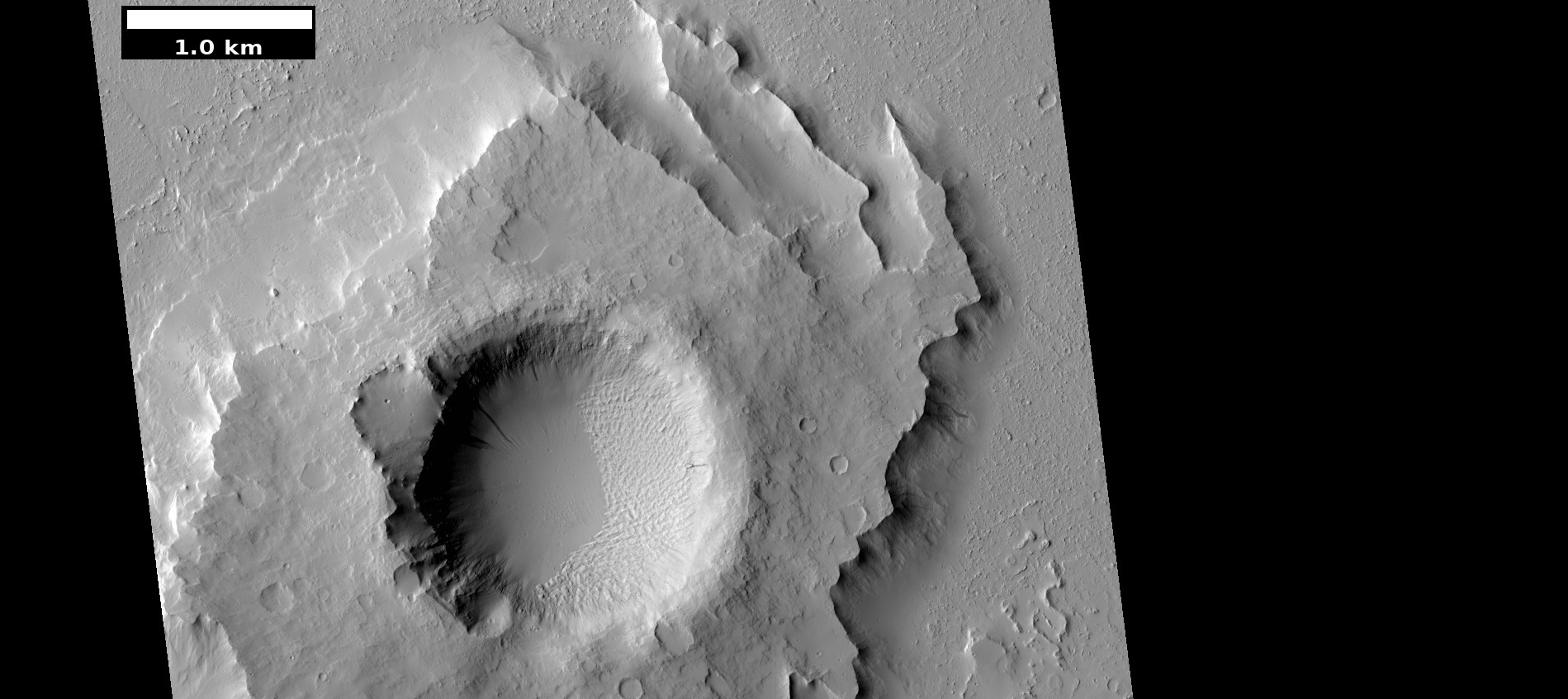
Pedestal crater with layers, as seen by HiRISE under HiWish program Location is Amazonis quadrangle.

== Halo Craters ==
Halo craters have been eroded so much that just a ring of boulders exist.

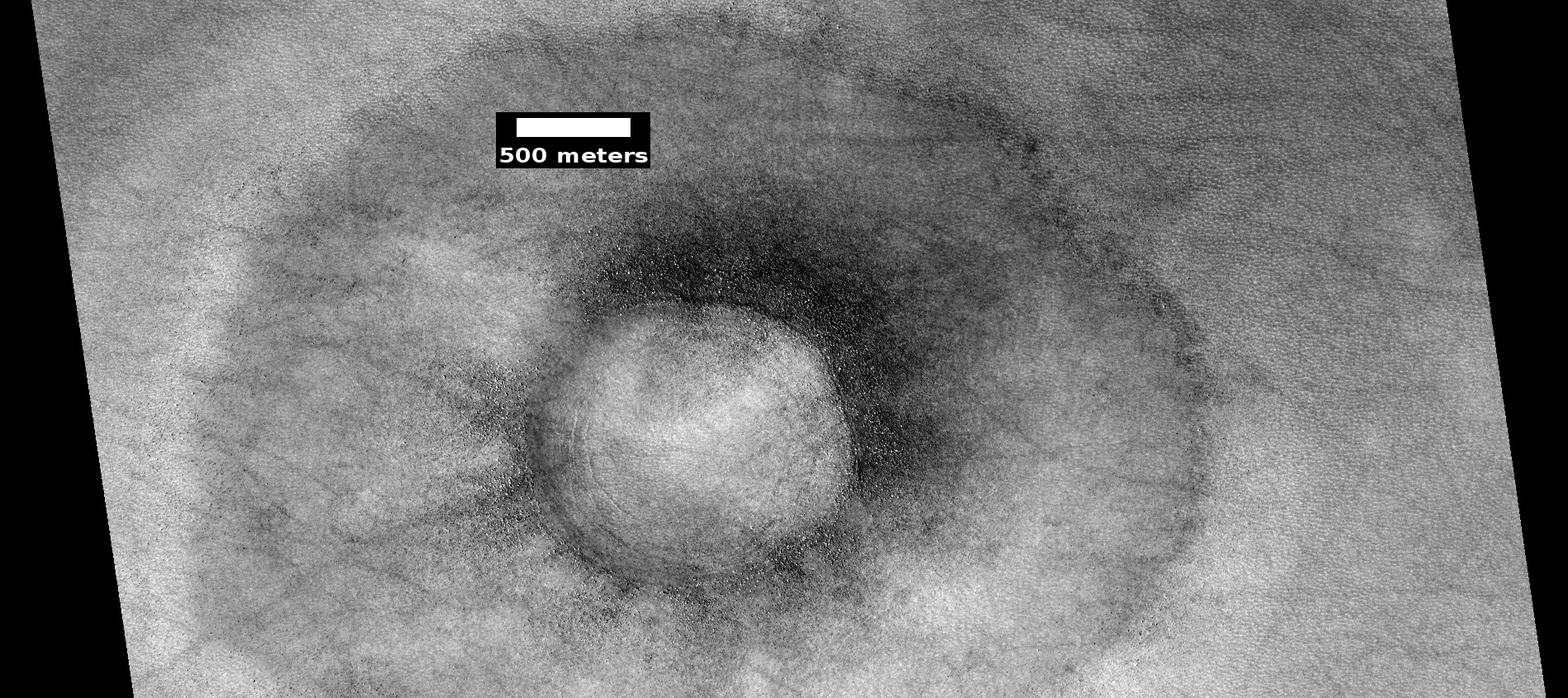
Pedestal crater with boulders along rim. Such craters are called "halo craters." Picture taken with HiRISE under HiWish program.

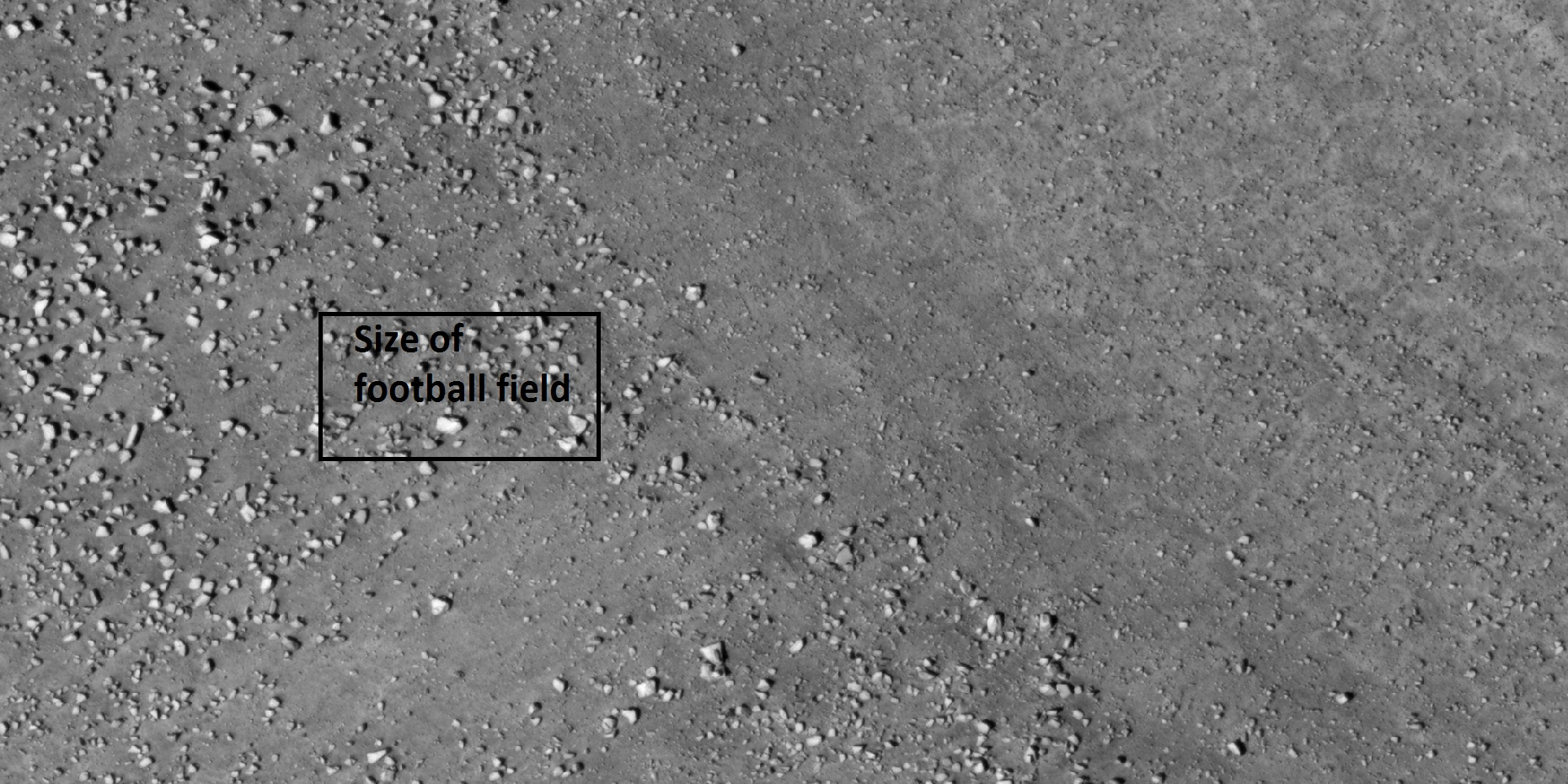
Close view of boulders on lower left of crater rim Box is the size of a football field, so boulders are roughly the size of cars or small houses. Picture taken with HiRISE under HiWish program.

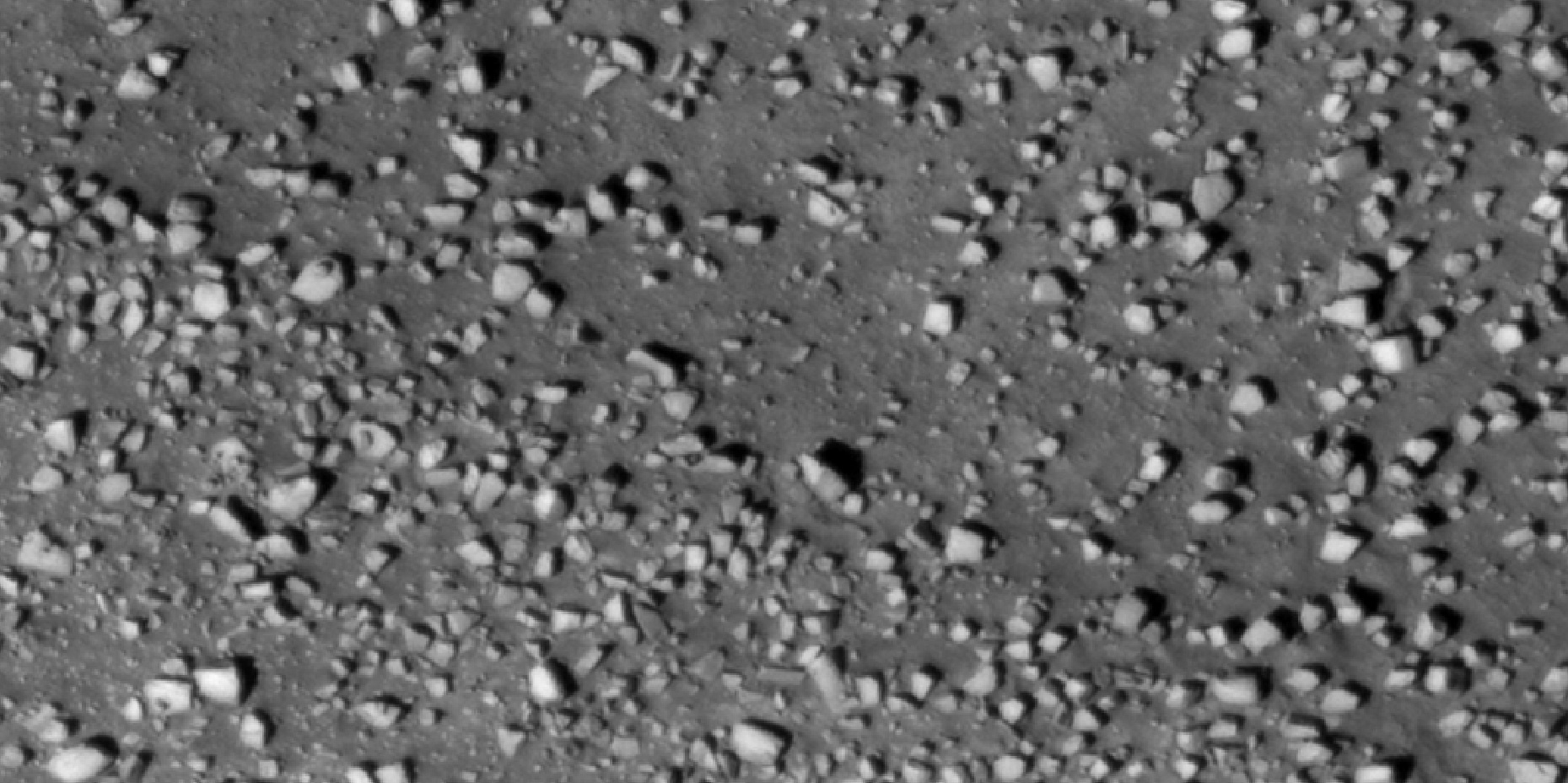
Close view of boulders along crater rim Boulders are roughly the size of cars or small houses. Picture taken with HiRISE under HiWish program.

== Boulders ==
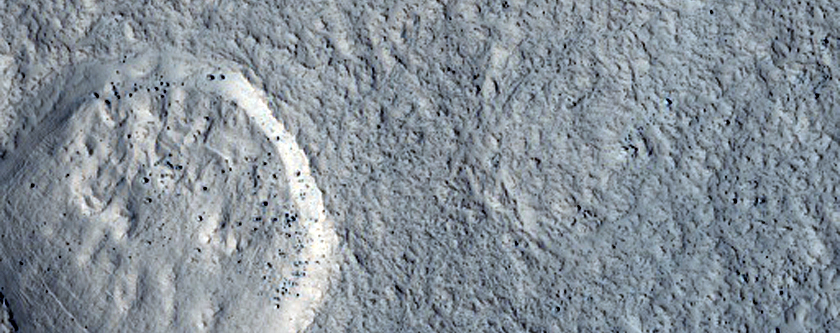
Boulders, as seen by HiRISE under HiWish program Location is Ismenius Lacus quadrangle.

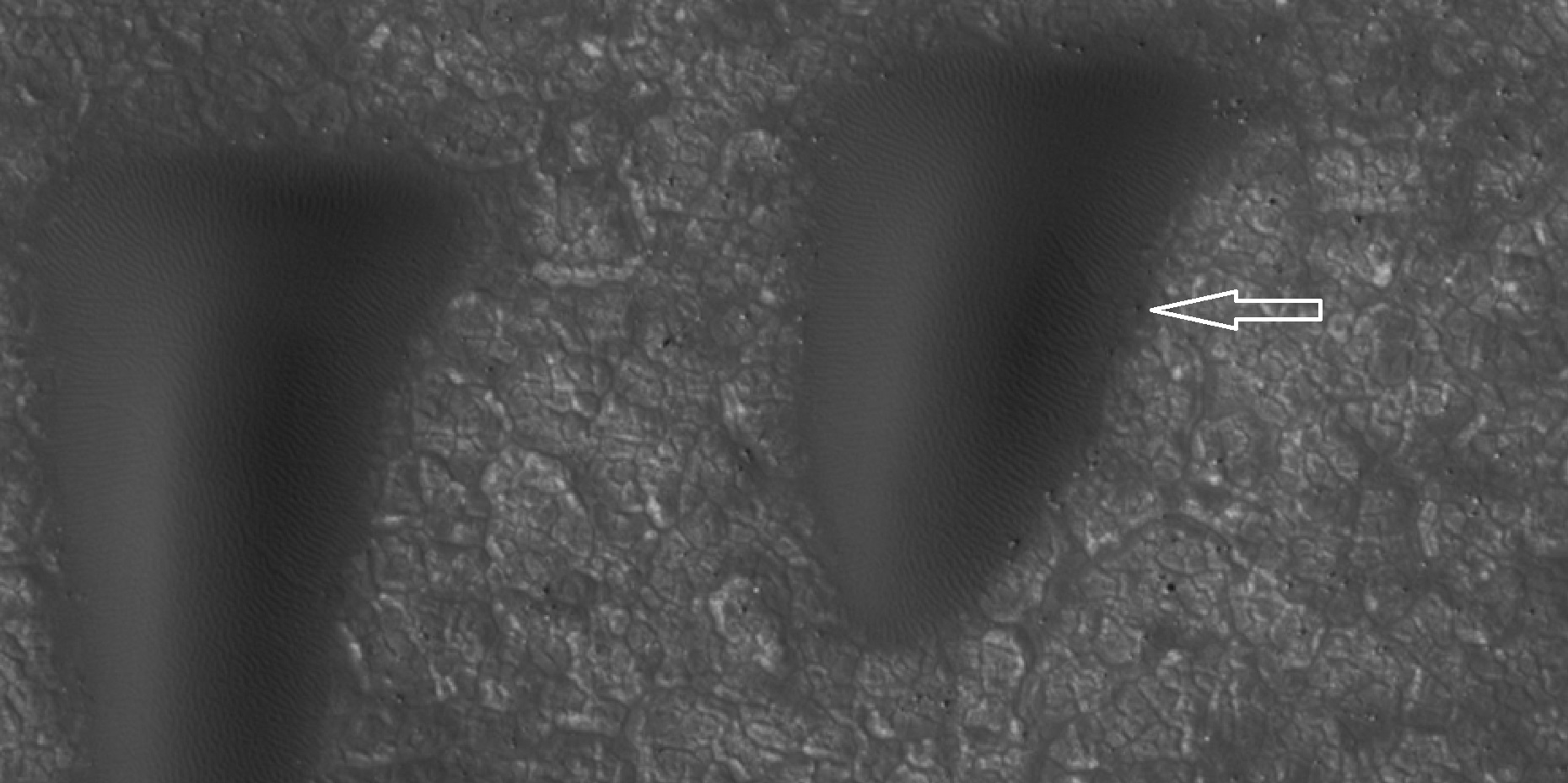
Boulder and boulder tracks, as seen by HiRISE under HiWish program The arrow shows a boulder that has made a track in the sand as it rolled down dune. Click on the picture to get a larger view that shows the boulder more clearly. Location is Mare Boreum quadrangle.

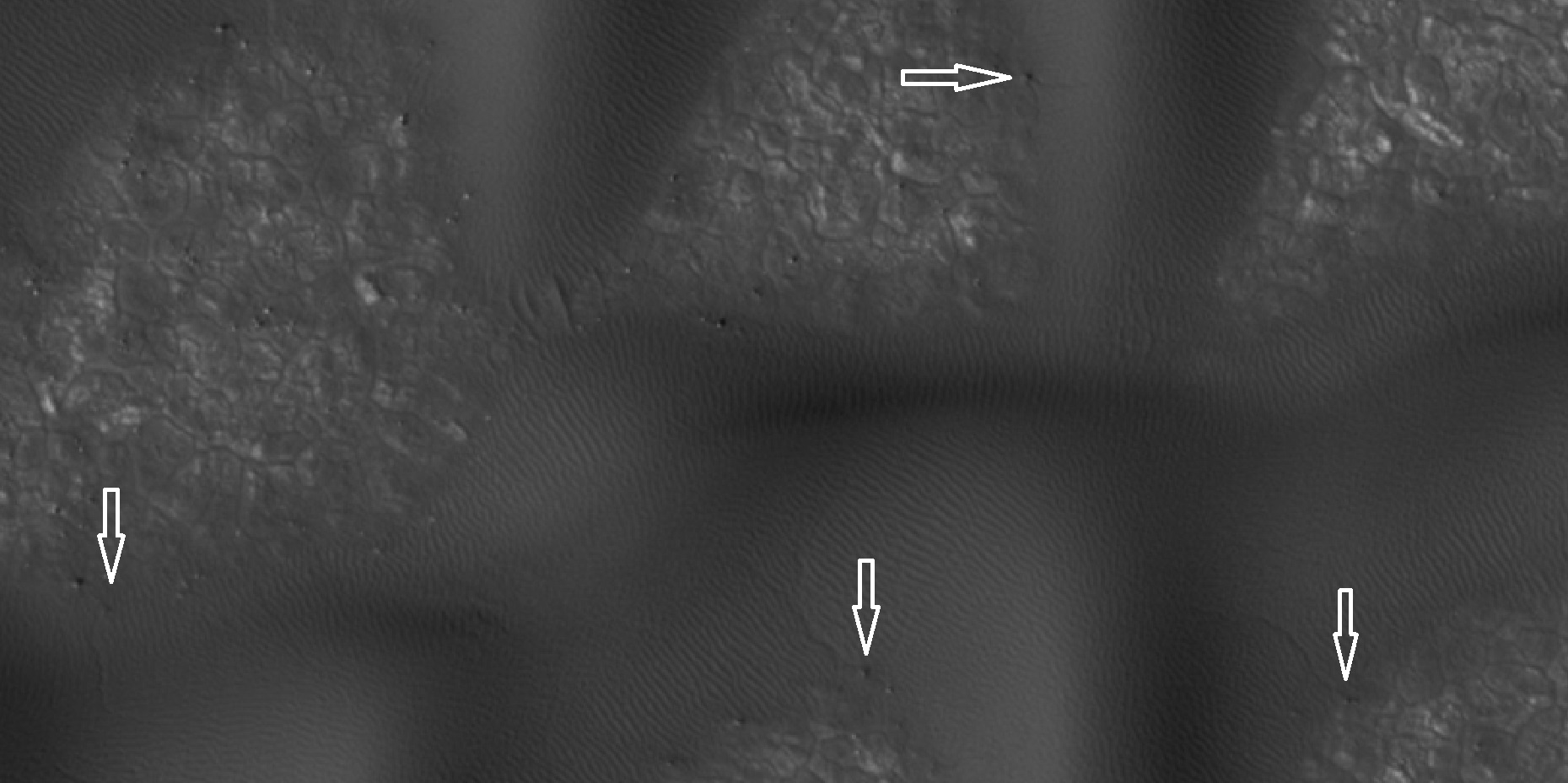
Boulders and tracks, as seen by HiRISE under HiWish program The arrows show a boulders that have produced a track by rolling down dune. Click on the picture to get a larger view that shows the boulder more clearly. Location is Mare Boreum quadrangle.

== Brain terrain ==
Brain terrain is a feature of the Martian surface, consisting of complex ridges found on lobate debris aprons, lineated valley fill and concentric crater fill. It is so named because it suggests the ridges on the surface of the human brain. Wide ridges are called closed-cell brain terrain, and the less common narrow ridges are called open-cell brain terrain. It is thought that the wide closed-cell terrain contains a core of ice, and when the ice disappears the center of the wide ridge collapses to produce the narrow ridges of the open-cell brain terrain.

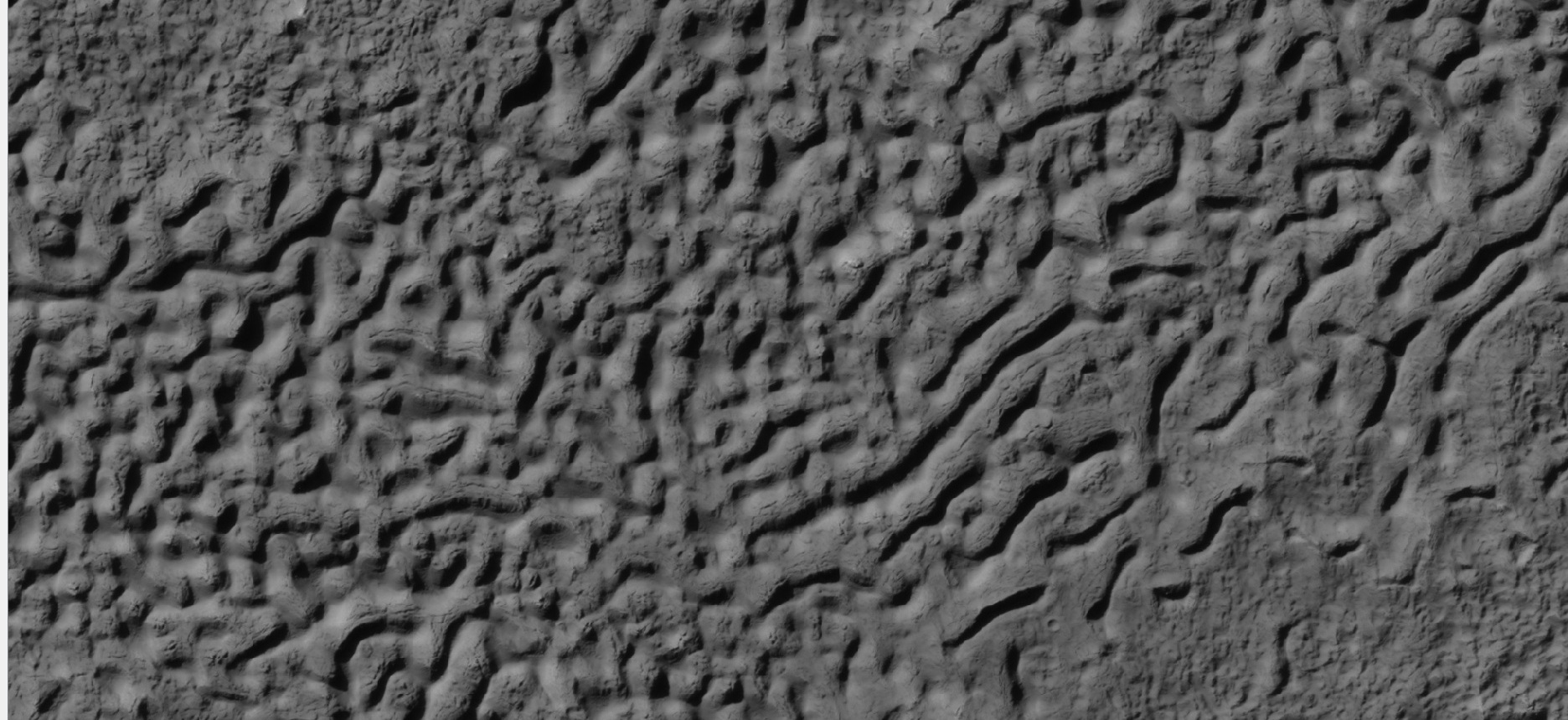
Closed-cell brain terrain, as seen by HiRISE under the HiWish program. This type of surface is common on lobate debris aprons, concentric crater fill, and lineated valley fill.

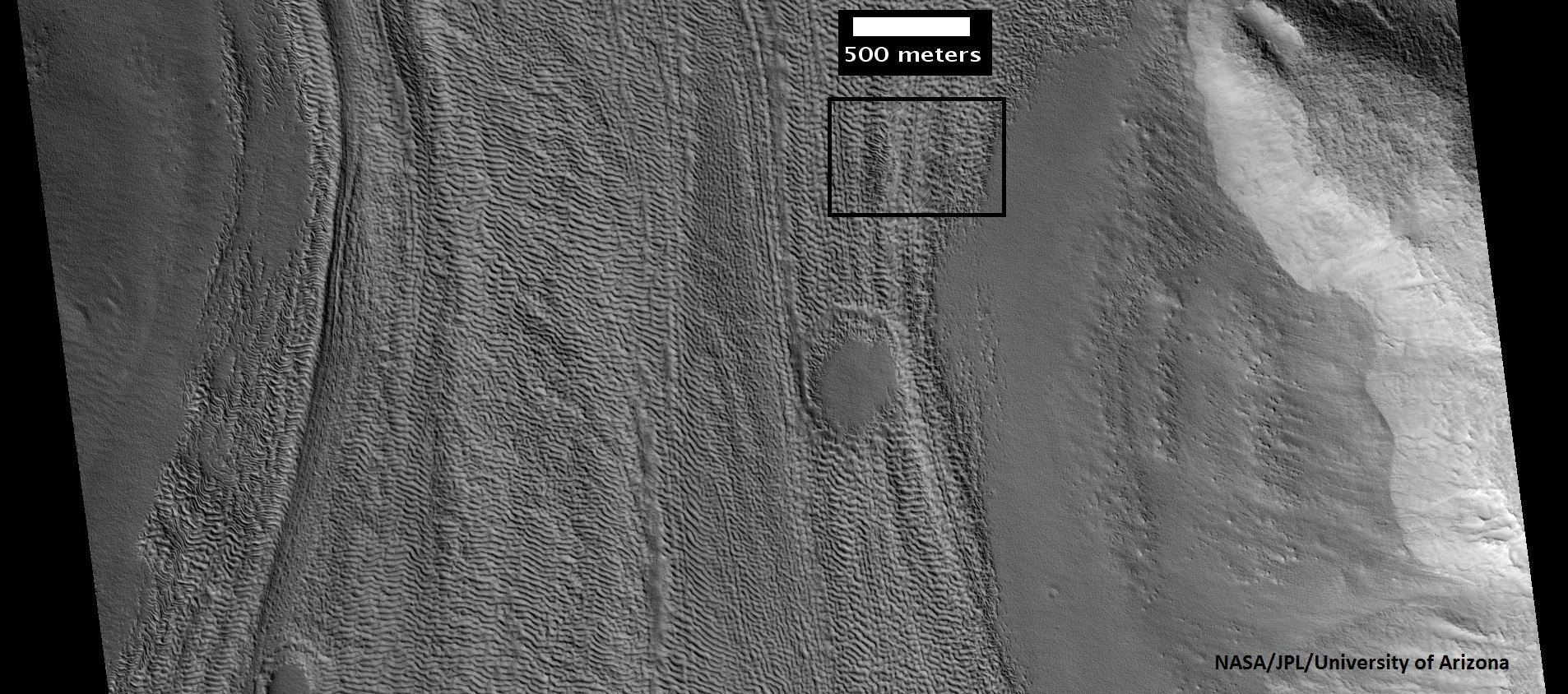
Context picture showing origin of next picture. The location is a region of lineated valley fill. Image from HiRISE under HiWish program.

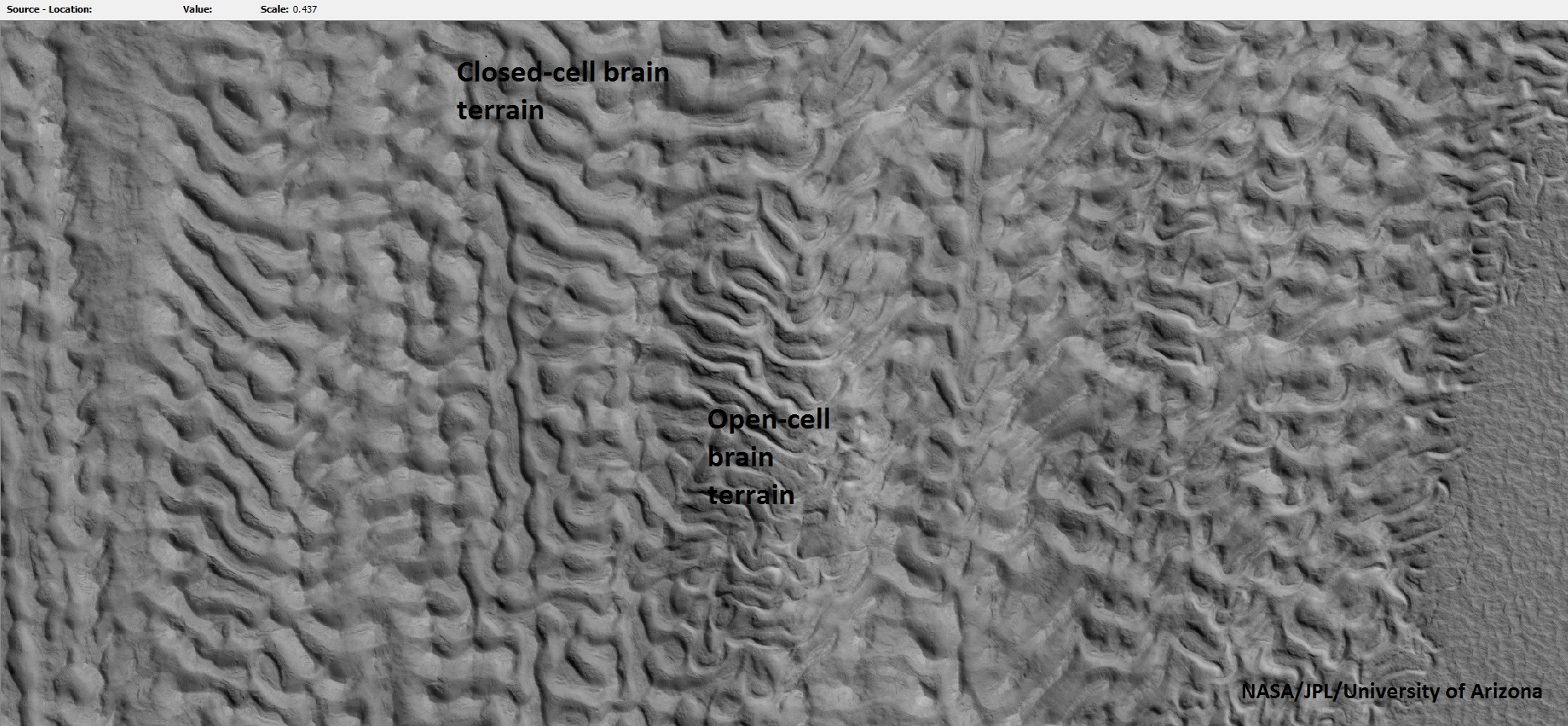
Open and closed-cell brain terrain, as seen by HiRISE, under HiWish program.
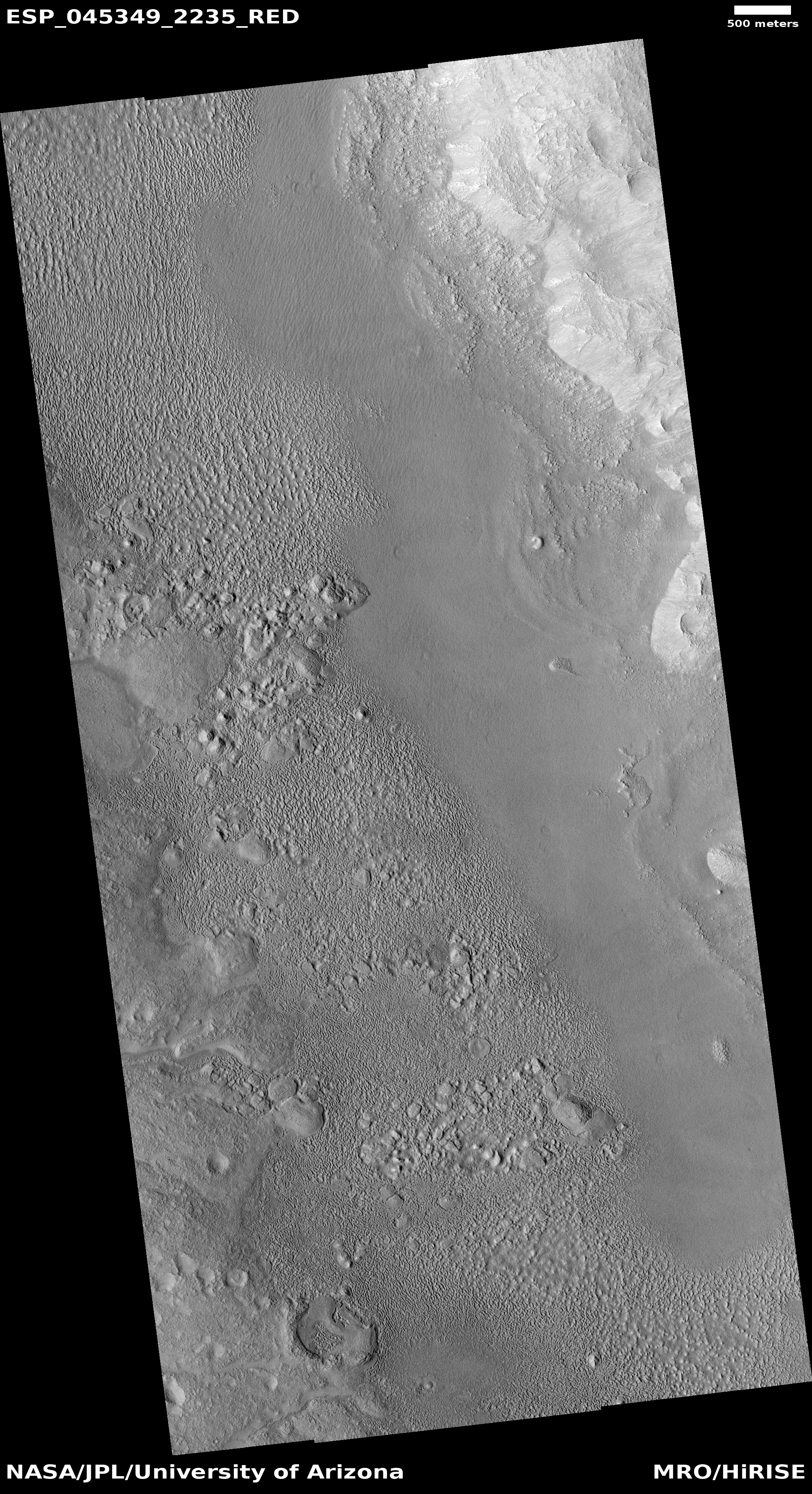
Wide view of brain terrain being formed, as seen by HiRISE under HiWish program

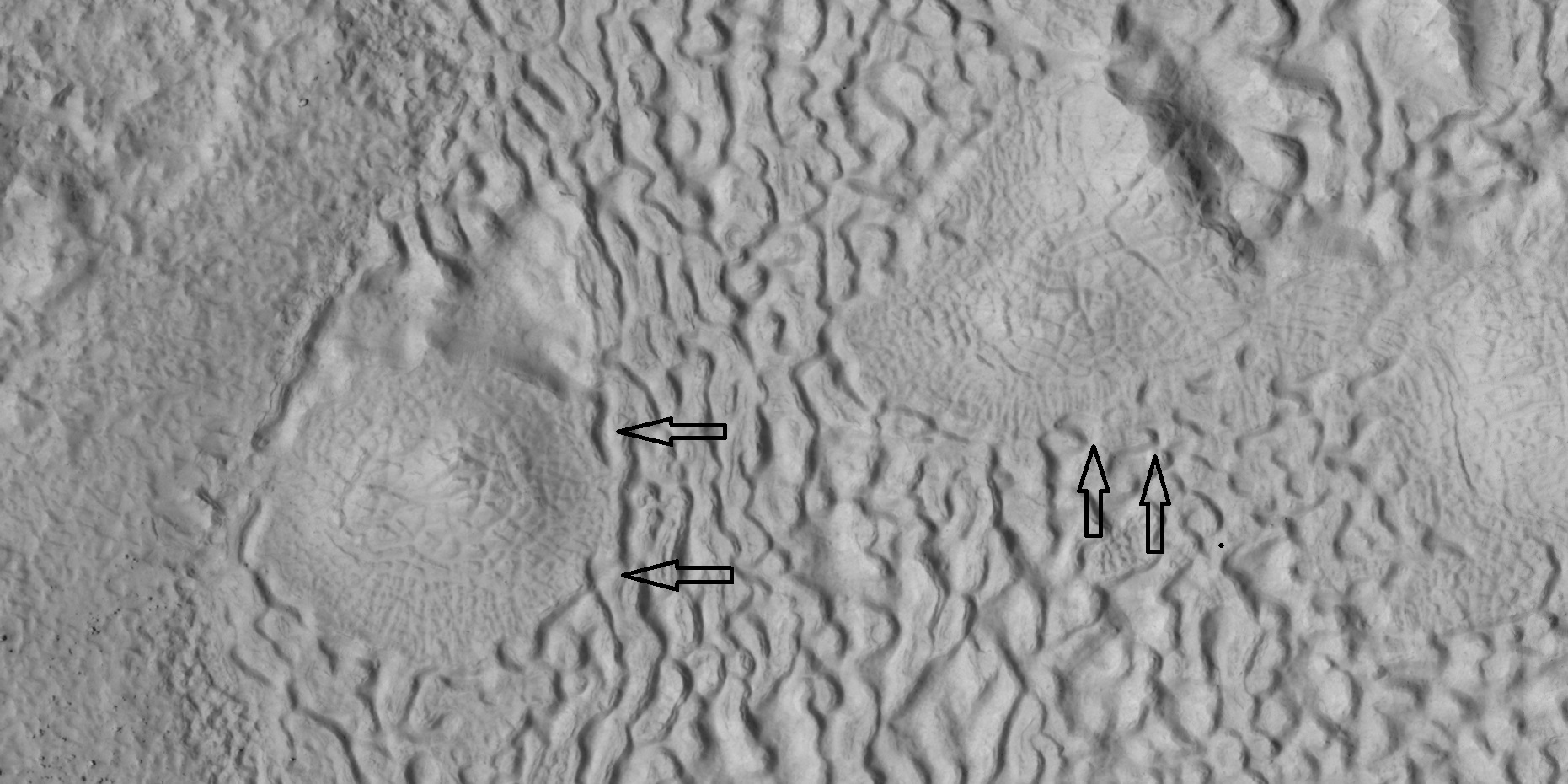
Brain terrain being formed, as seen by HiRISE under HiWish program Note: this is an enlargement of the previous image using HiView. Arrows indicate spots where brain terrain is beginning to form.

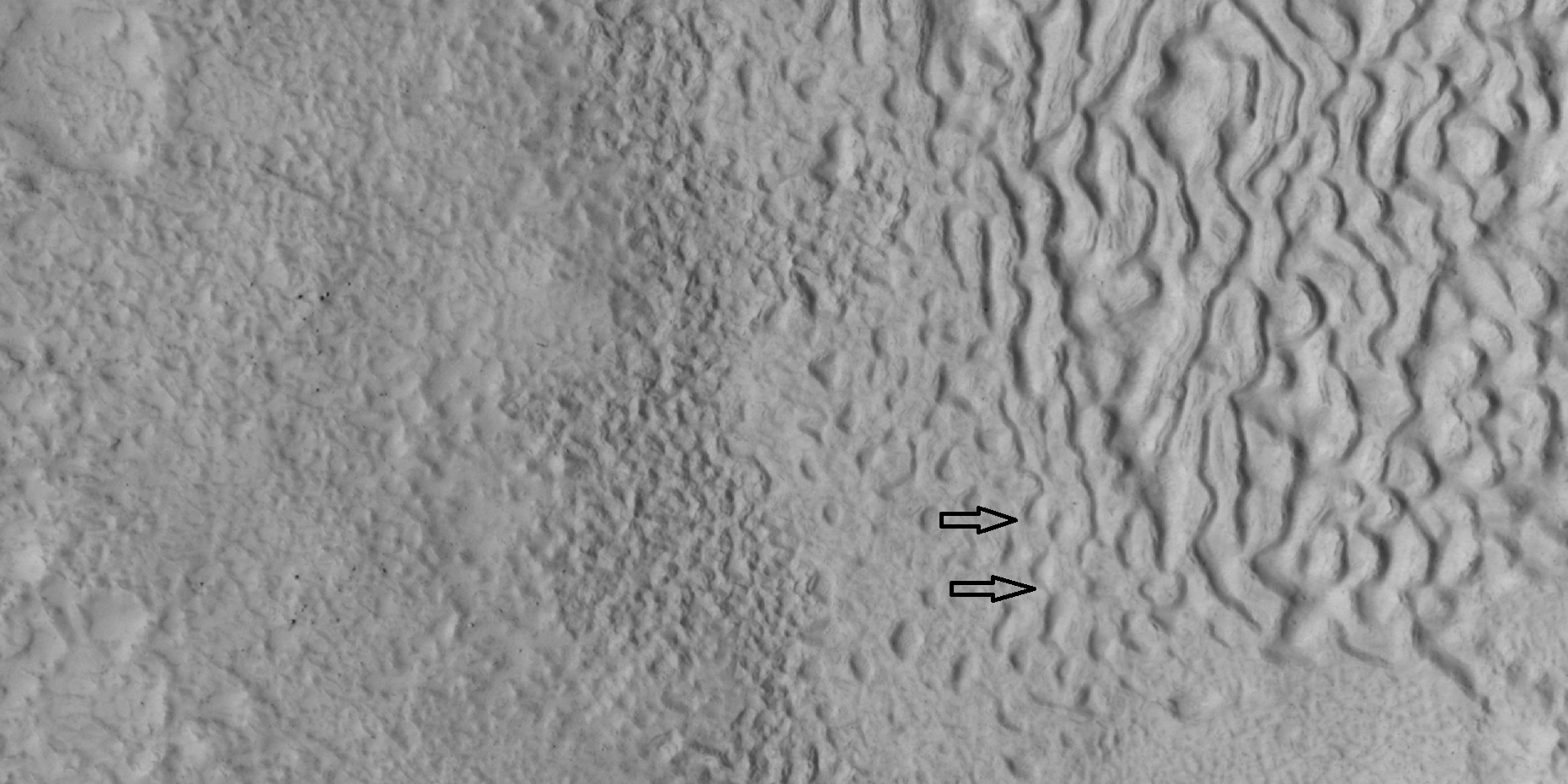
Brain terrain being formed, as seen by HiRISE under HiWish program Note: this is an enlargement of a previous image using HiView. Arrows indicate spots where brain terrain is beginning to form.

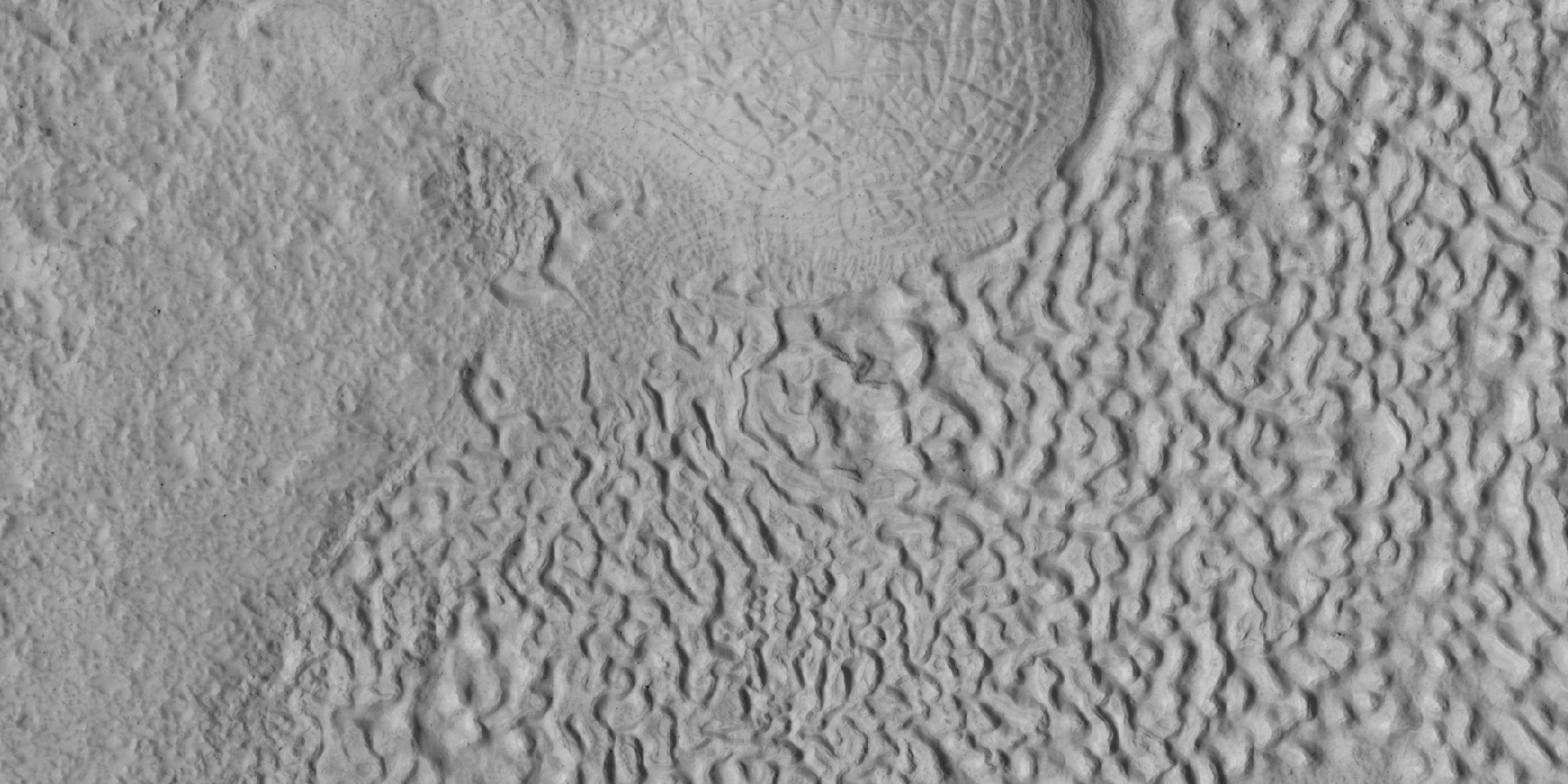
Brain terrain being formed, as seen by HiRISE under HiWish program Note: this is an enlargement of a previous image using HiView.

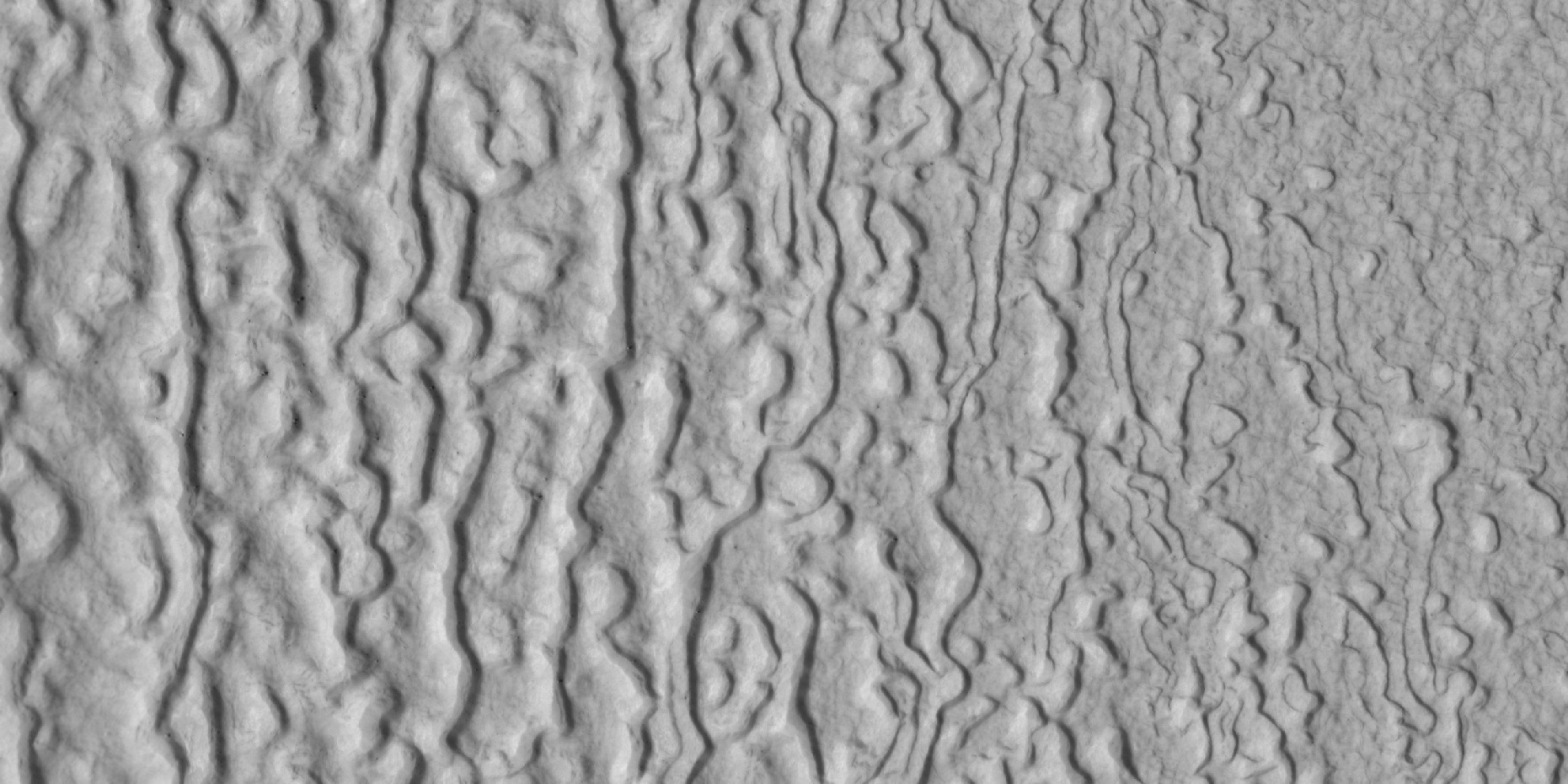
Brain terrain being formed, as seen by HiRISE under HiWish program Note: this is an enlargement of a previous image using HiView.

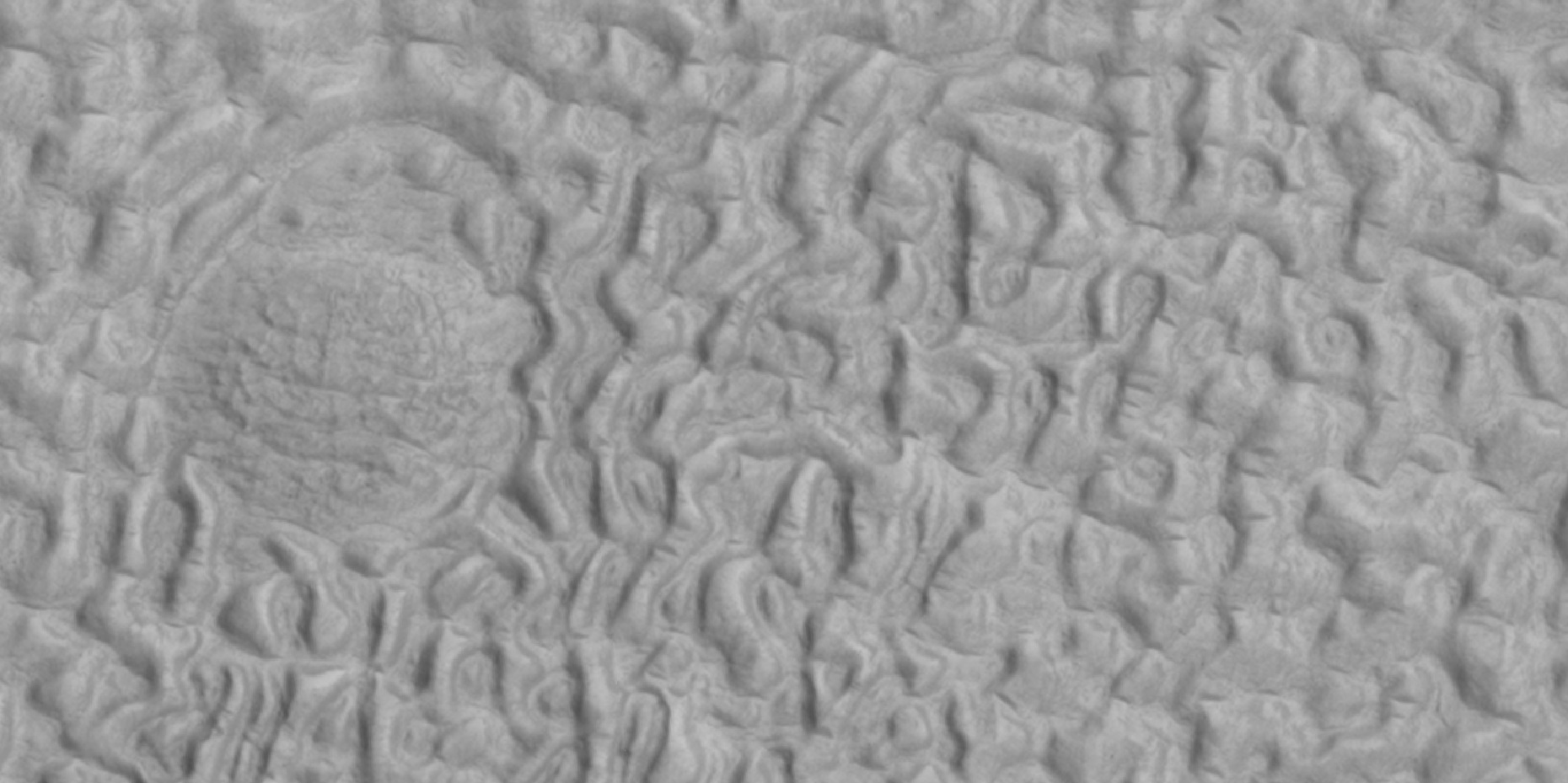
Brain terrain being formed, as seen by HiRISE under HiWish program
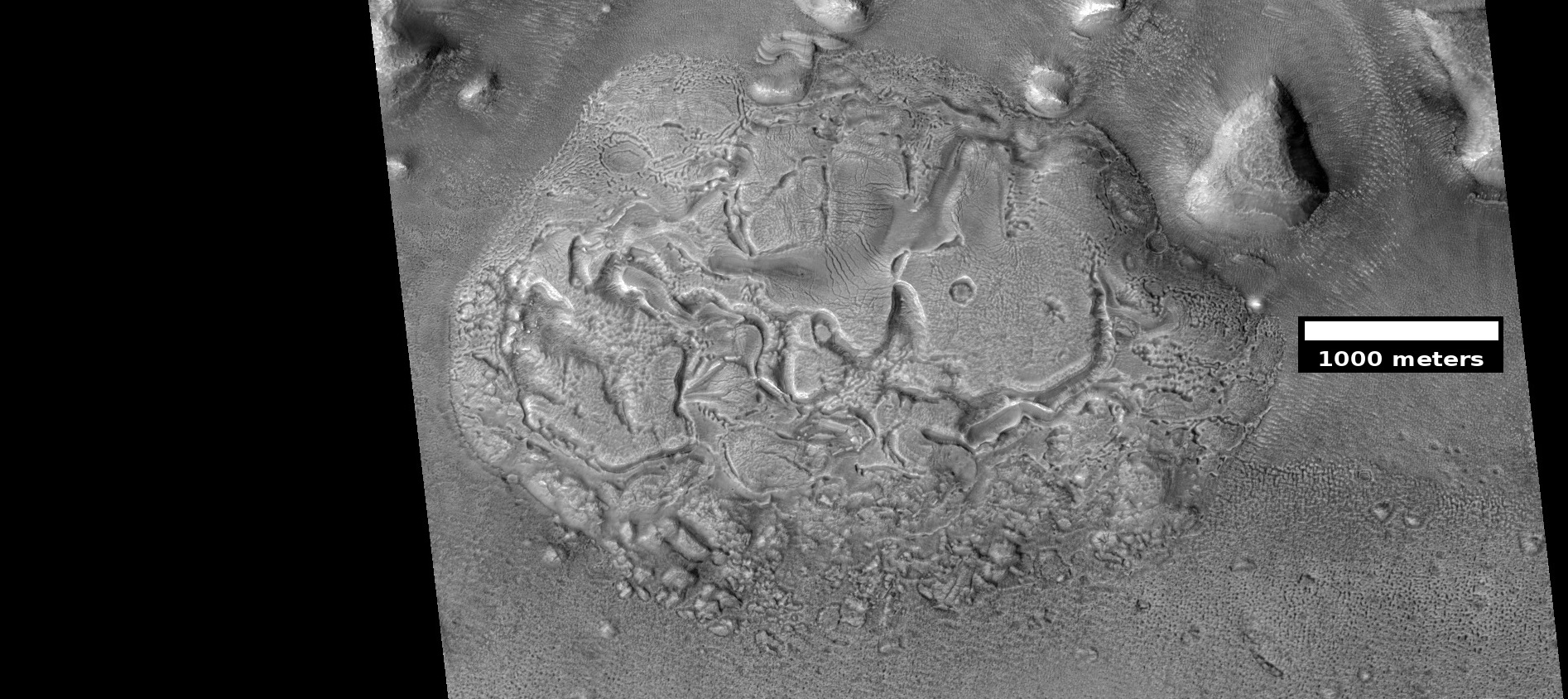
Wide view of brain terrain being formed, as seen by HiRISE under HiWish program

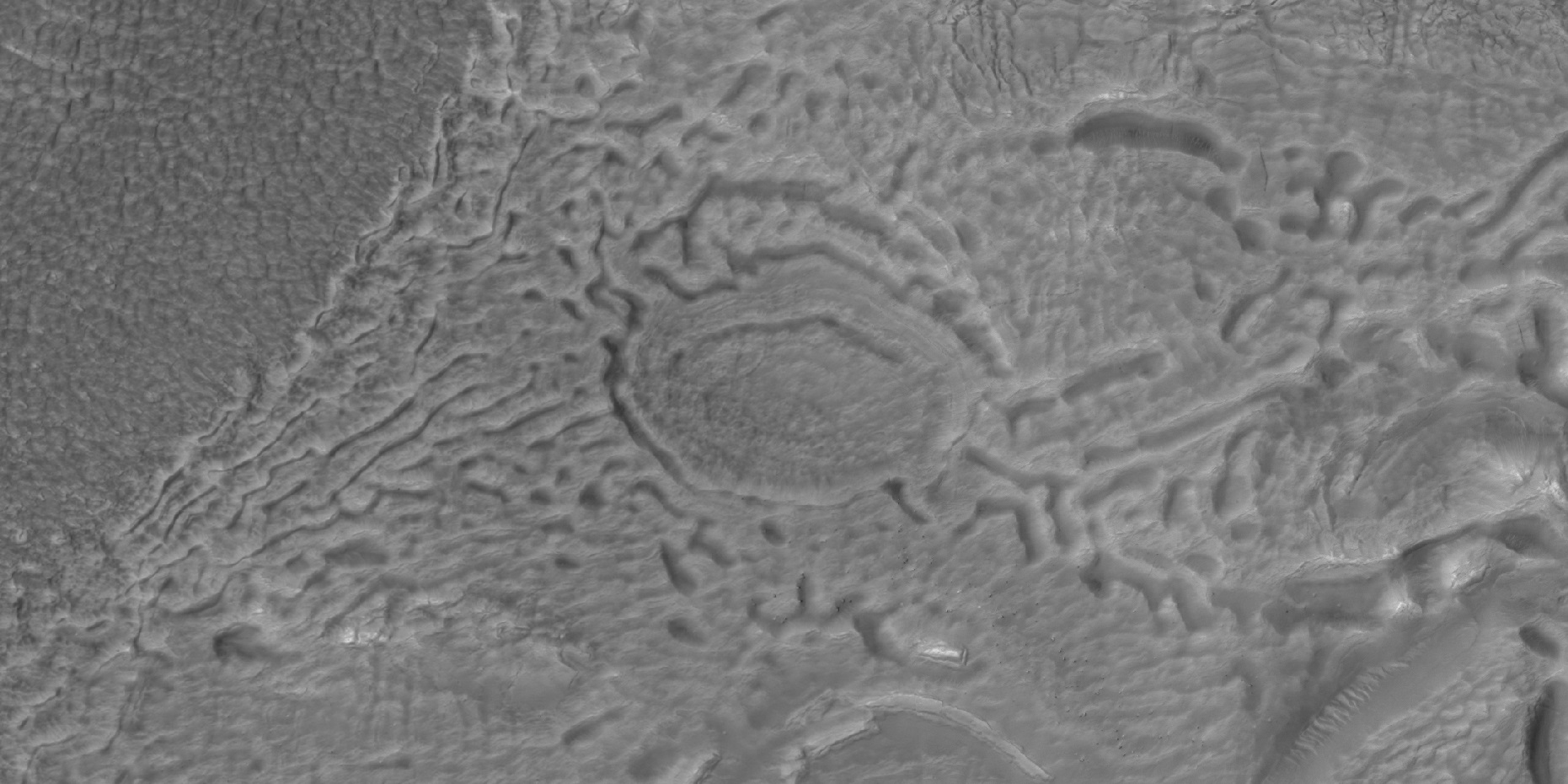
Brain terrain being formed, as seen by HiRISE under HiWish program Note: this is an enlargement of the previous image using HiView.

== Ring mold craters ==
Ring mold craters are believed to be formed from asteroid impacts into ground that has an underlying layer of ice. The impact produces a rebound of the ice layer to form a "ring-mold" shape. These features may be markers where ground ice is especially thick. Future colonists may send robots to these types of formations to harvest ice.

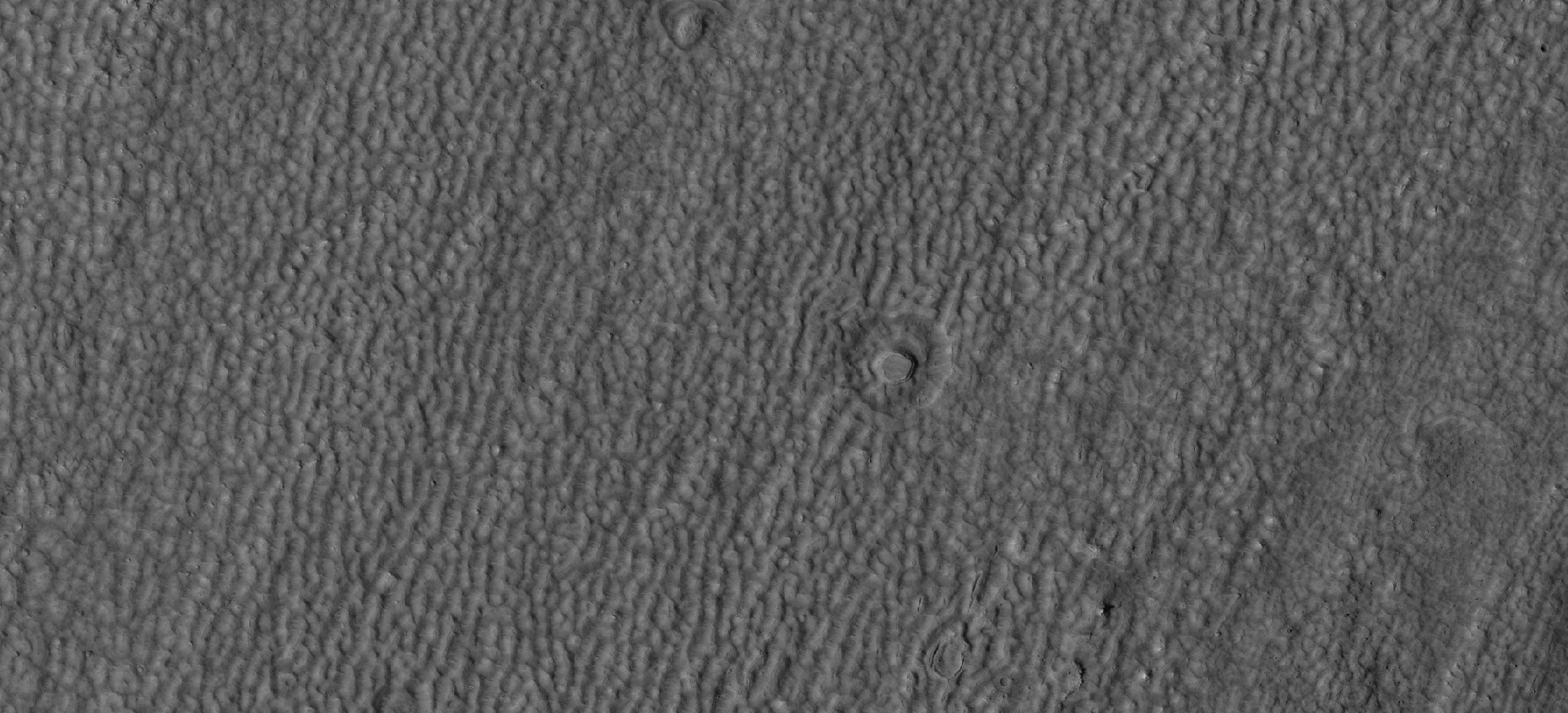
Ring mold craters on floor of a crater, as seen by HiRISE under HiWish program Location is Ismenius Lacus quadrangle.

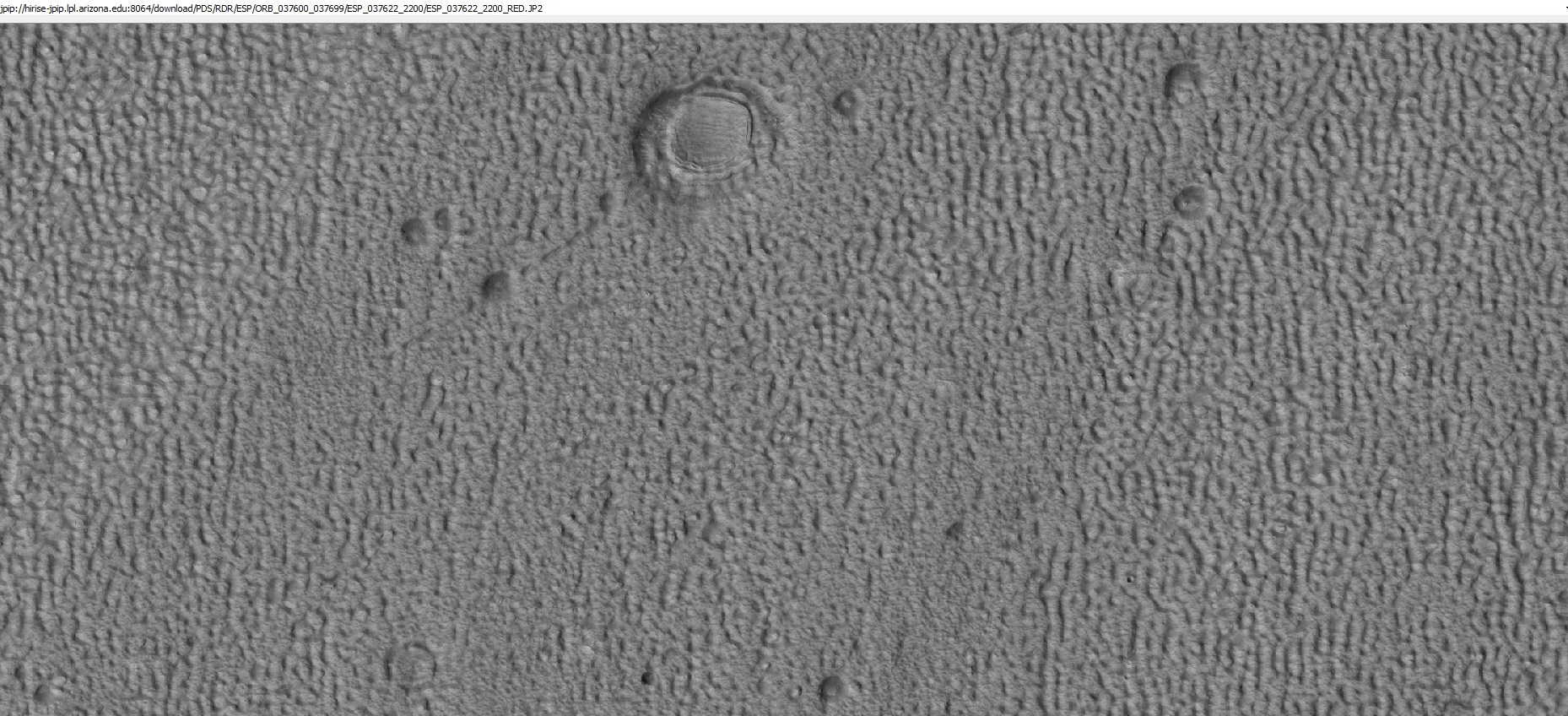
Ring mold craters of various sizes on floor of a crater, as seen by HiRISE under HiWish program Location is Ismenius Lacus quadrangle.

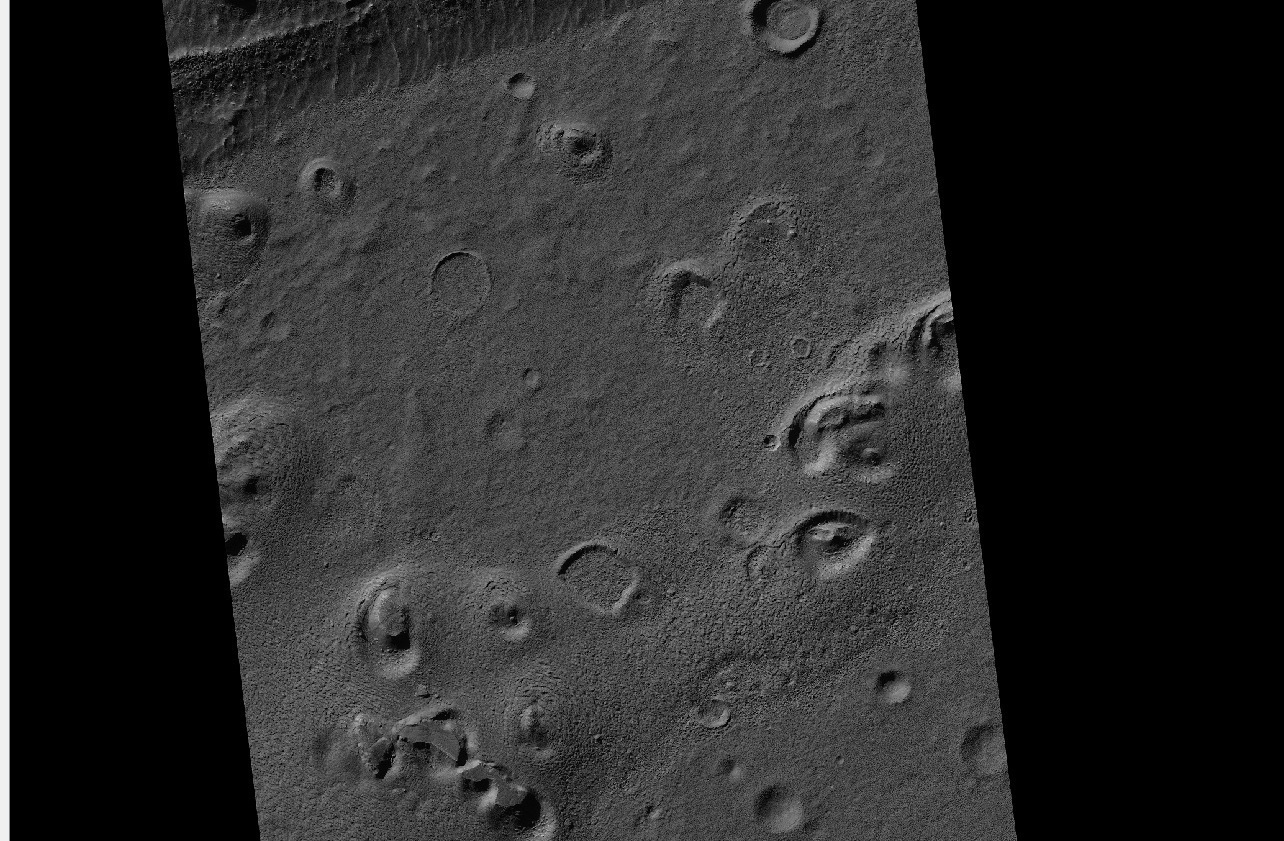
Wide view of a field of ring mold craters, as seen by HiRISE under HiWish program

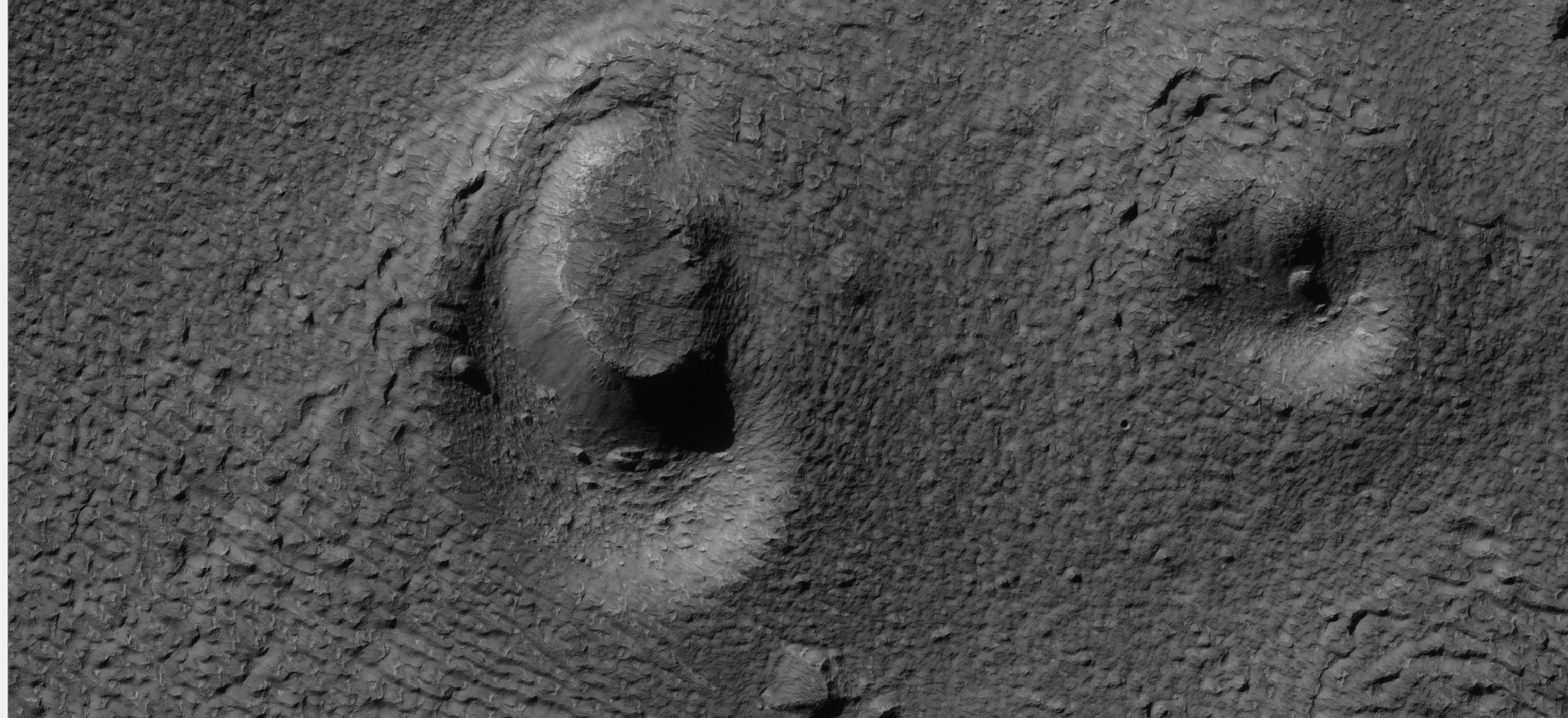
Close view of ring mold crater, as seen by HiRISE under HiWish program Note: this is an enlargement of the previous image of a field of ring mold craters.

== Rootless cones ==
Rootless cones are caused by explosions of lava with ground ice under the flow. The ice melts and turns into a vapor that expands in an explosion that produces a cone or ring. Features like these are found in Iceland, when lavas cover water-saturated substrates.

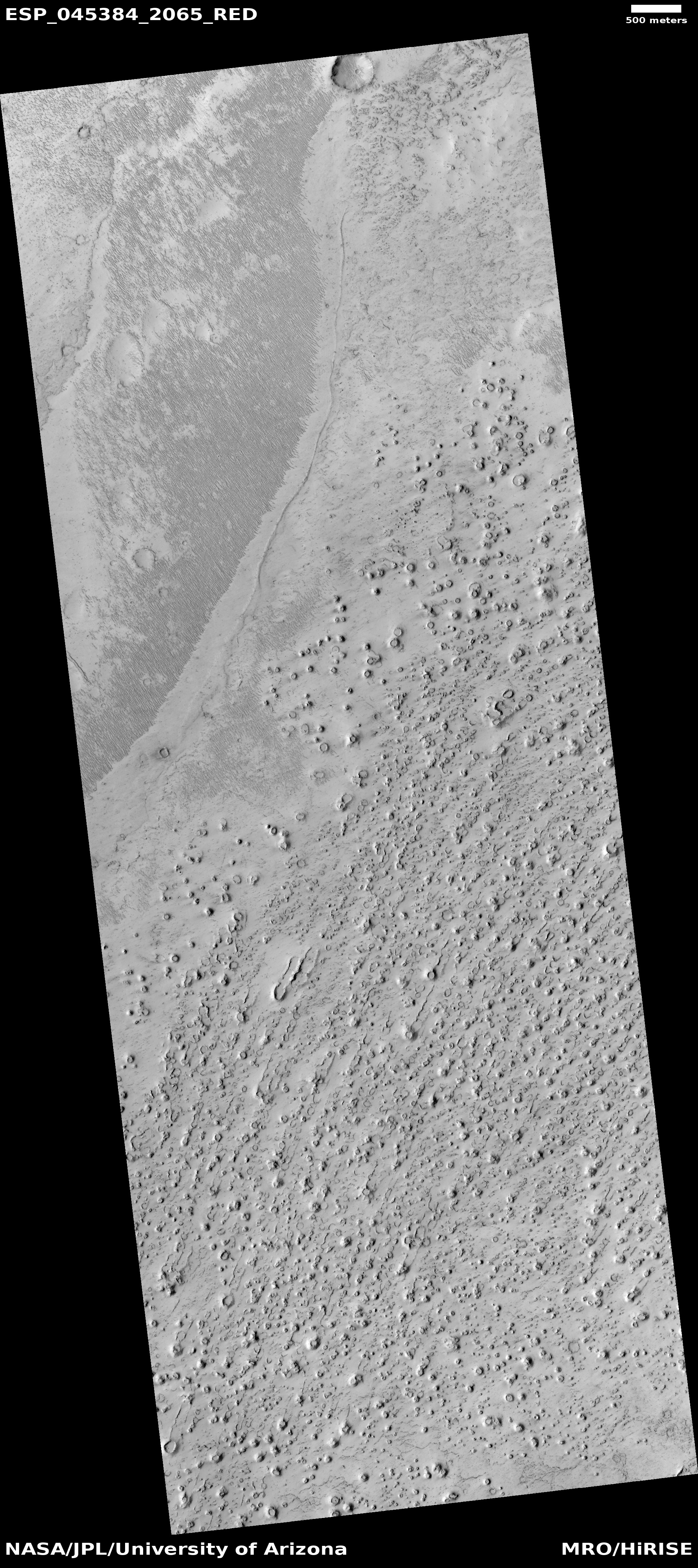
Wide view of field of rootless cones, as seen by HiRISE under HiWish program

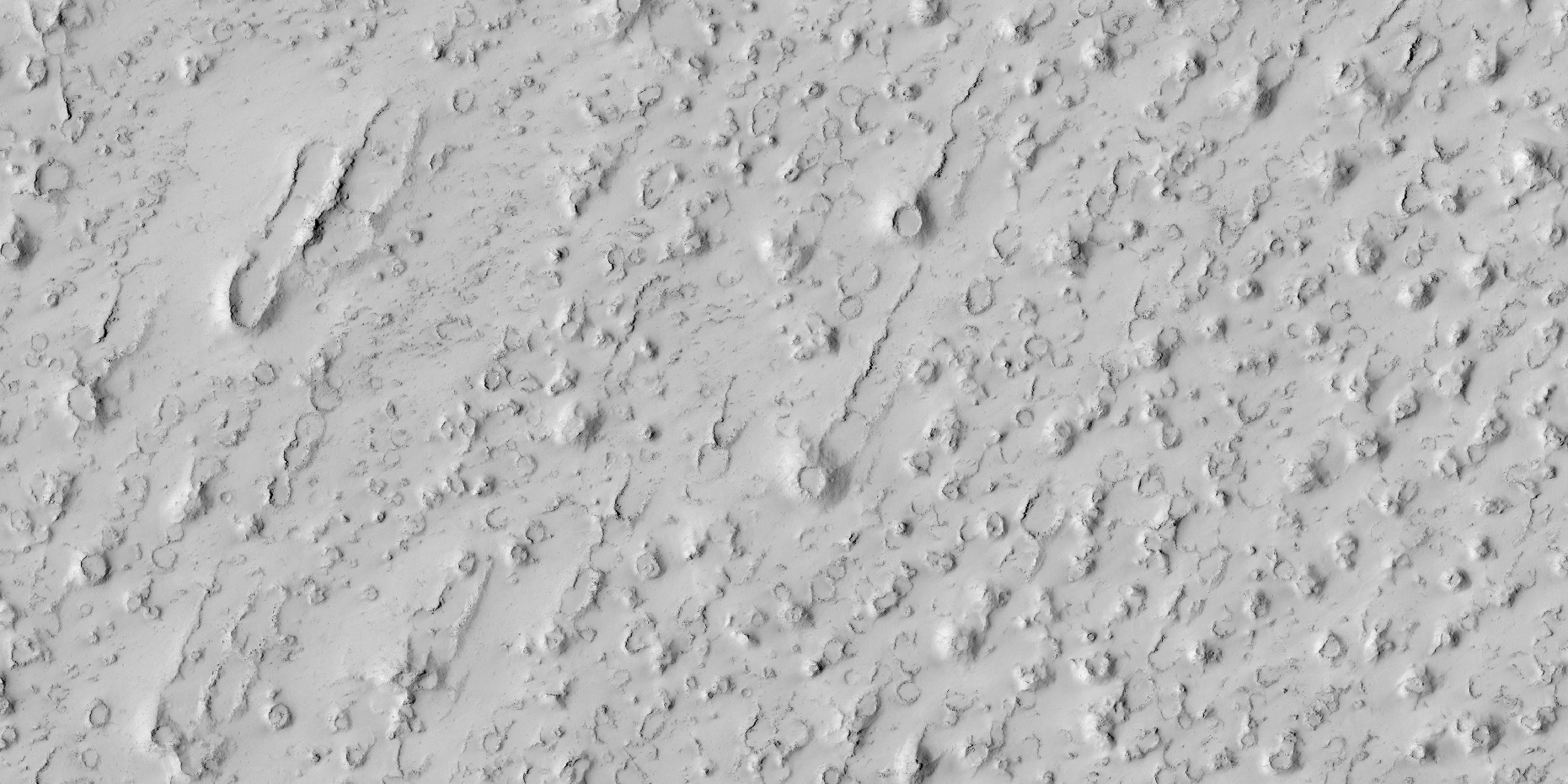
Close view of rootless cones with tails that suggest lava was moving toward the Southwest over ice-rich ground, as seen by HiRISE under HiWish program

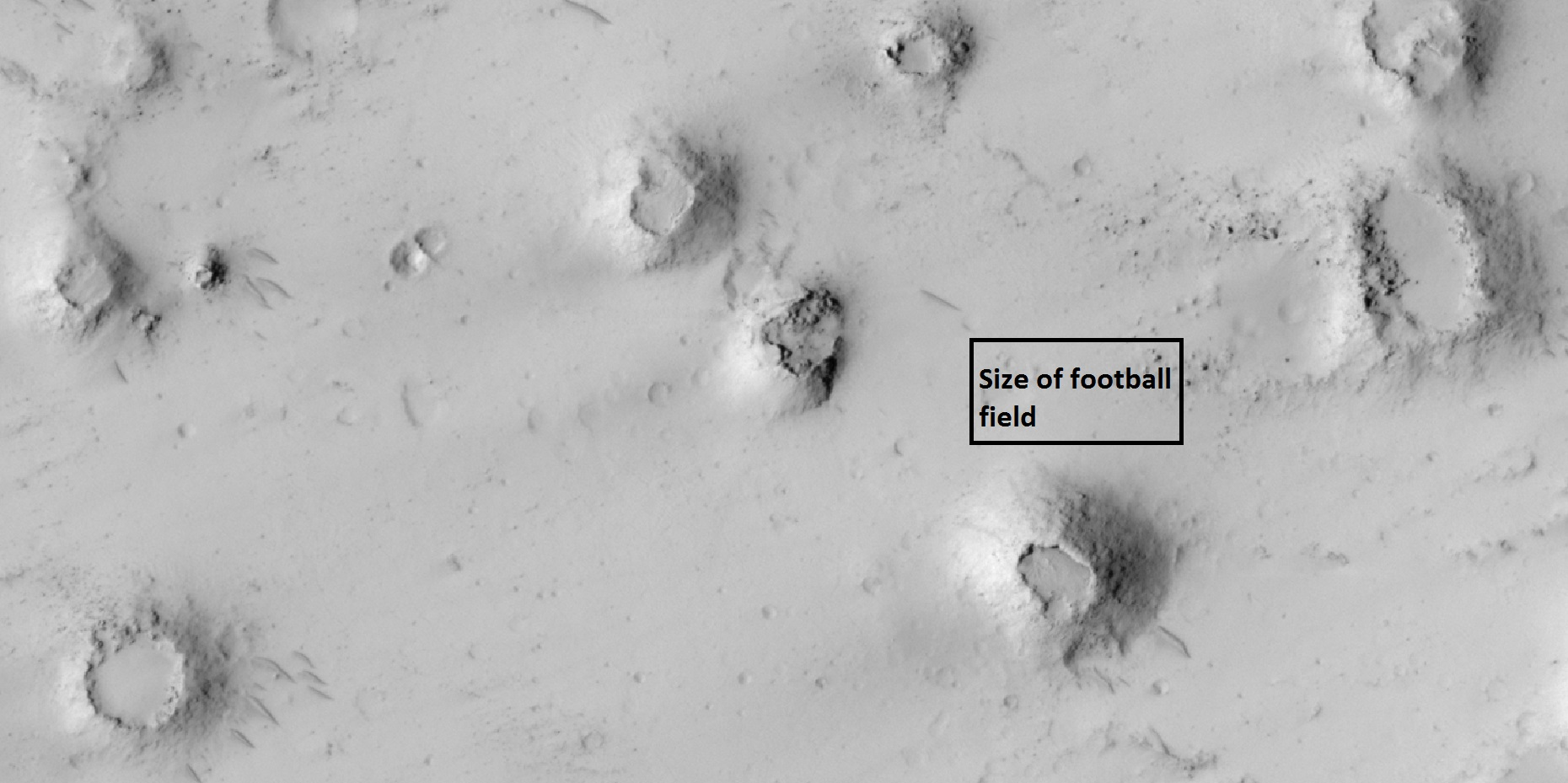
Close view of cones with the size of a football field shown, as seen by HiRISE under HiWish program

== Mud volcanoes ==
Some features look like volcanoes. Some of them may be mud volcanoes where pressurized mud is forced upward forming cones. These features may be places to look for life as they bring to the surface possible life that has been protected from radiation.

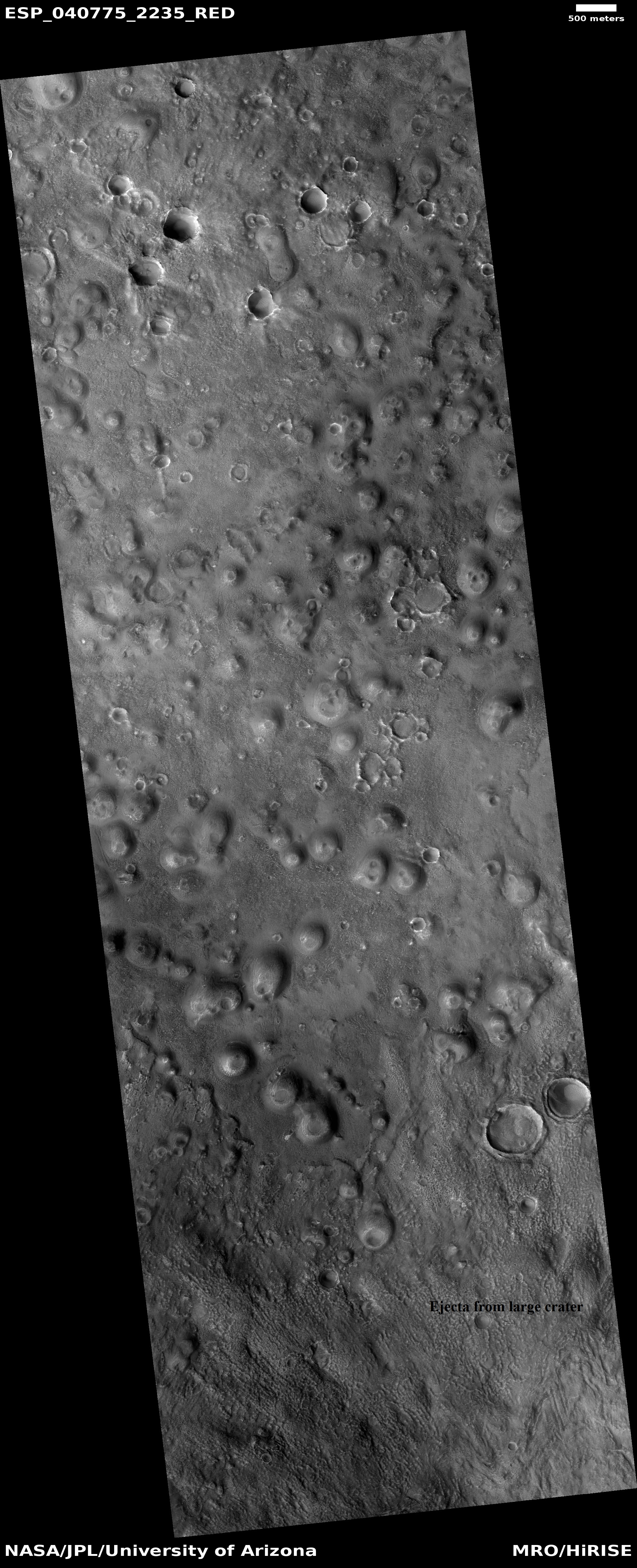
Large field of cones that may be mud volcanoes, as seen by HiRISE under HiWish program

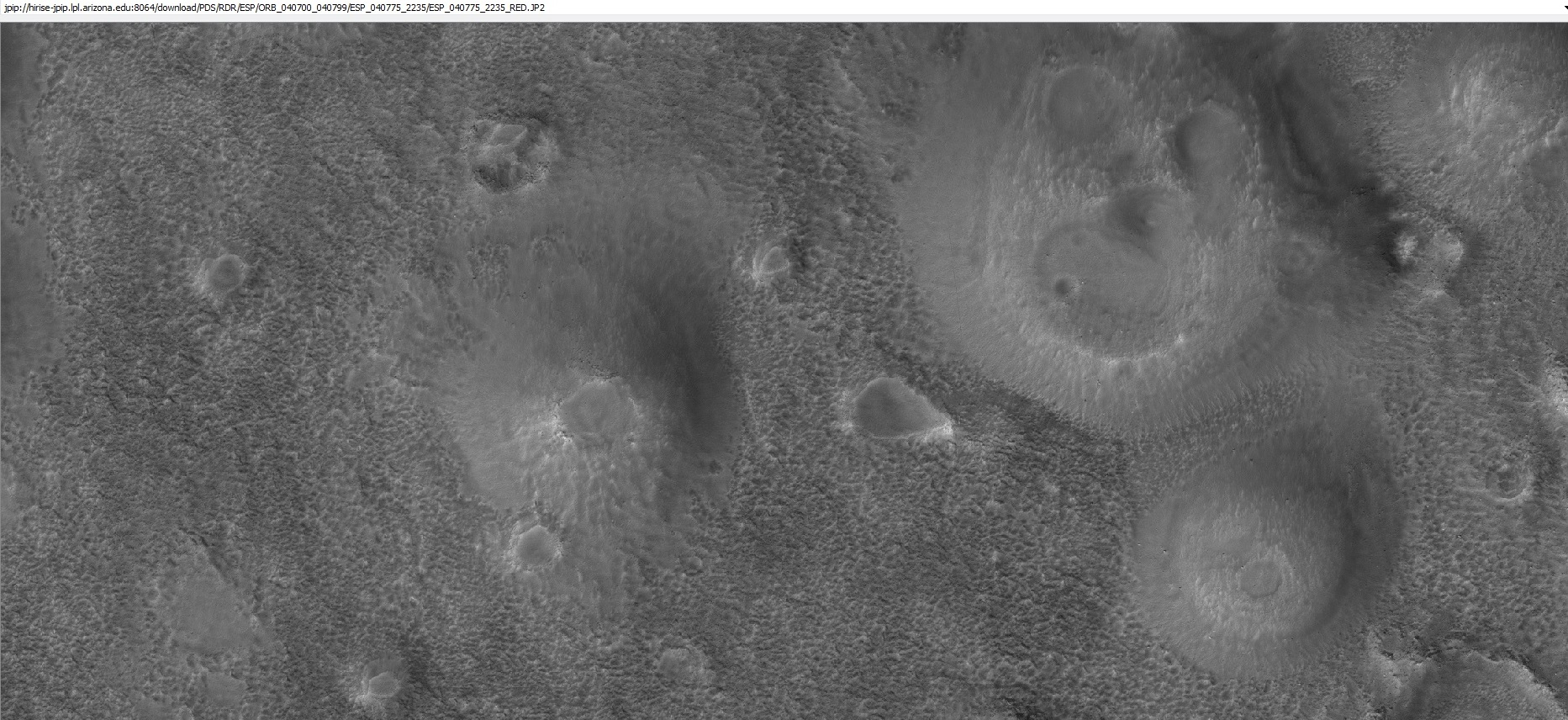
Close-up of possible mud volcanoes, as seen by HiRISE under HiWish program Note: this is an enlargement of the previous image.

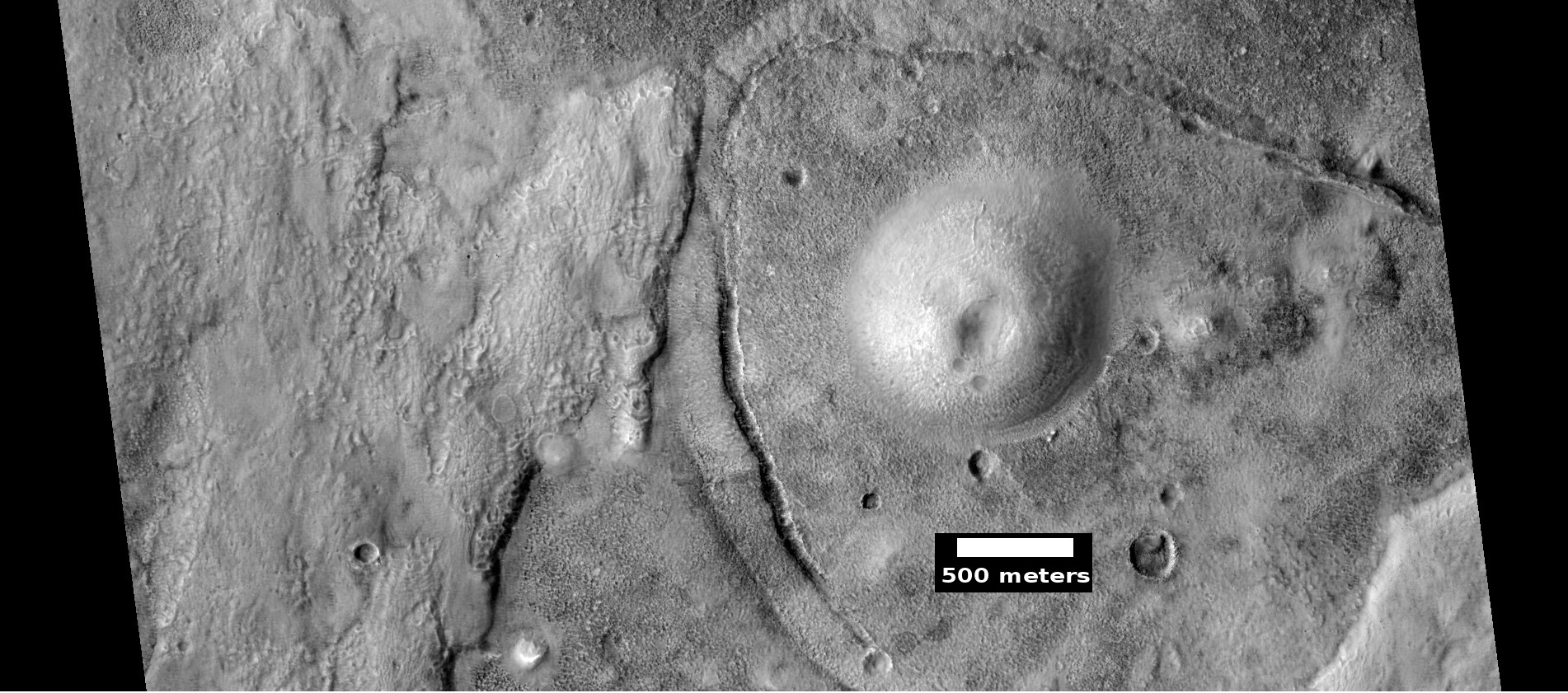
Possible mud volcano, as seen by HiRISE under HiWish program

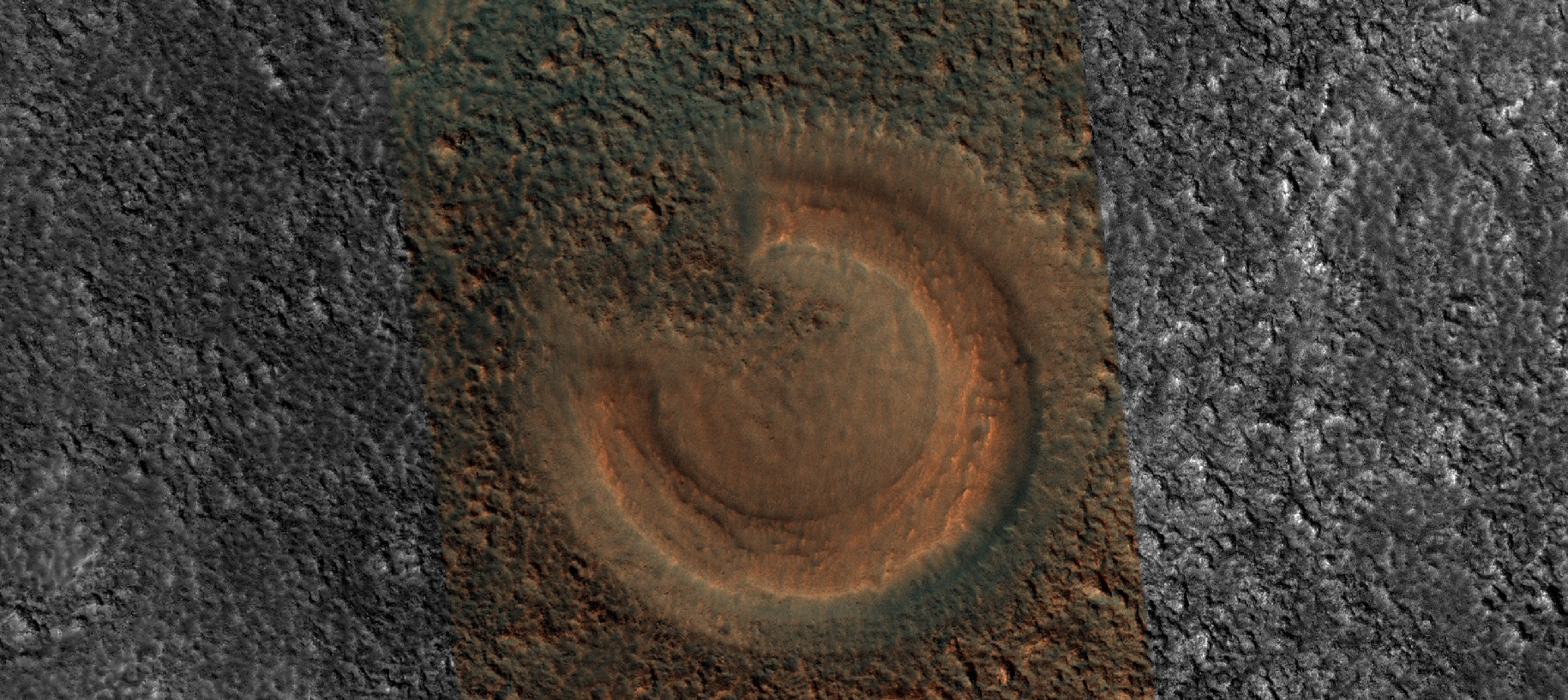
Close view of mud volcano, as seen by HiRISE. Picture is about 1 km across. This mud volcano has a different color than the surroundings because it consists of material brought up from depth. These structures may be useful to explore for remains of past life since they contain samples that would have been protected from the strong radiation at the surface.

== Lava flows ==
Mass has extensive fields of lava. Most of the lava was of the basalt variety. It was very liquid and could flow long distances. It often flowed about obstacles like mounds.

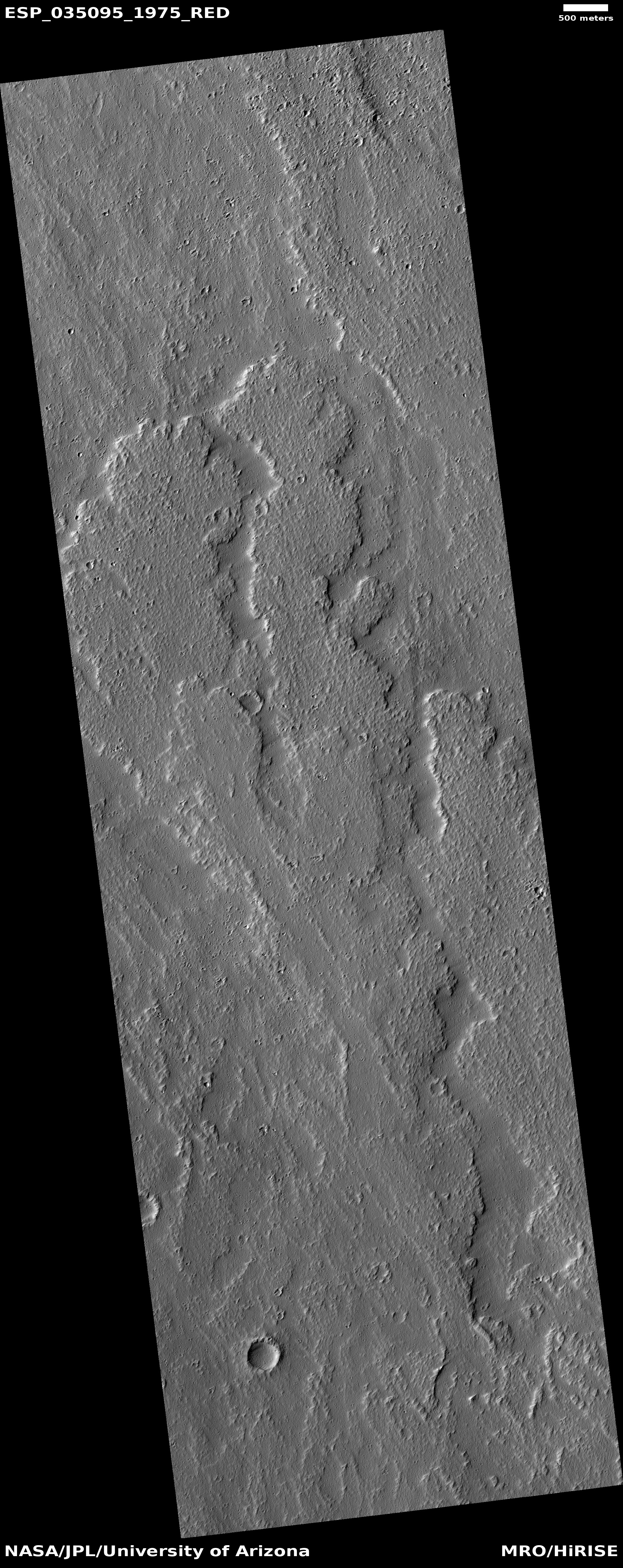
Lava flow in Tharsis quadrangle, as seen by HiRISE under HiWish program

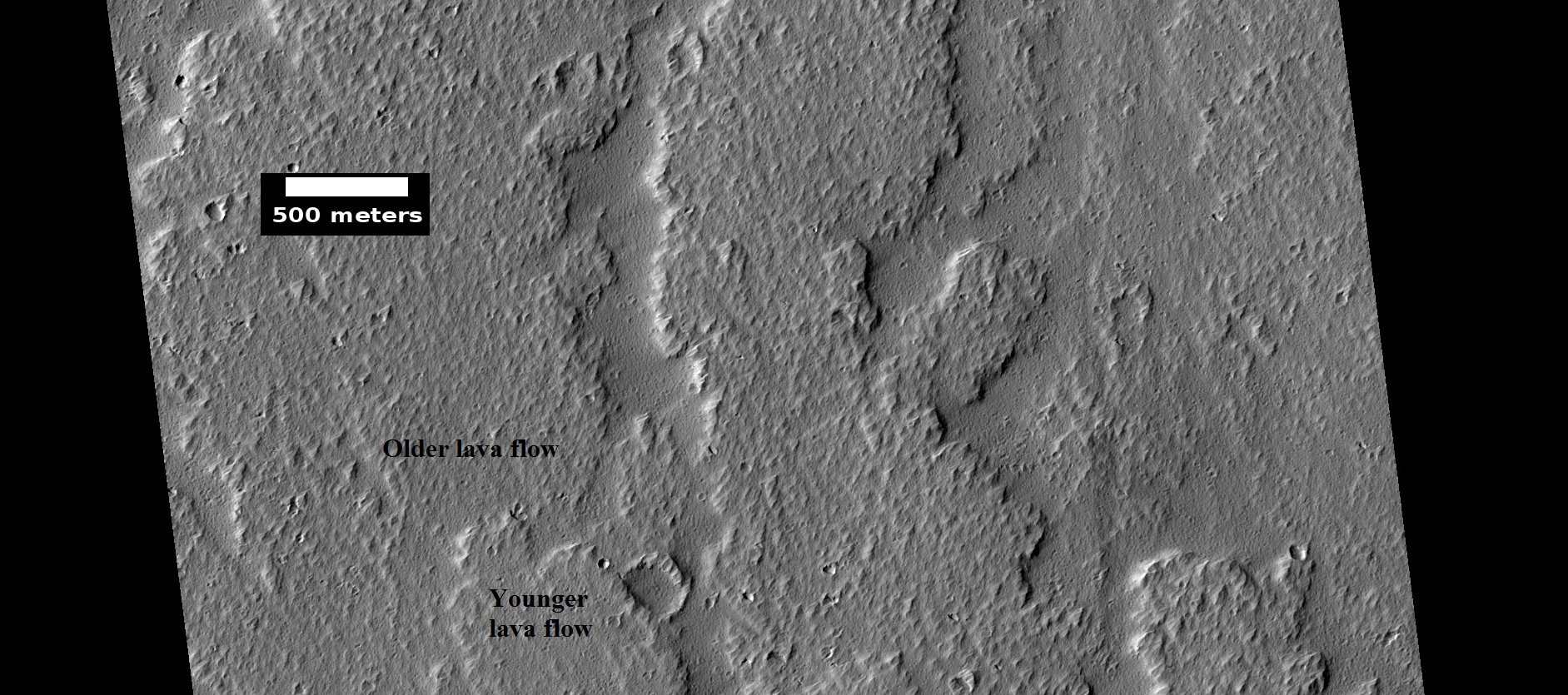
Close-up of lava flow with labels, as seen by HiRISE under HiWish program Note: this is an enlargement of the previous image of lava flows.

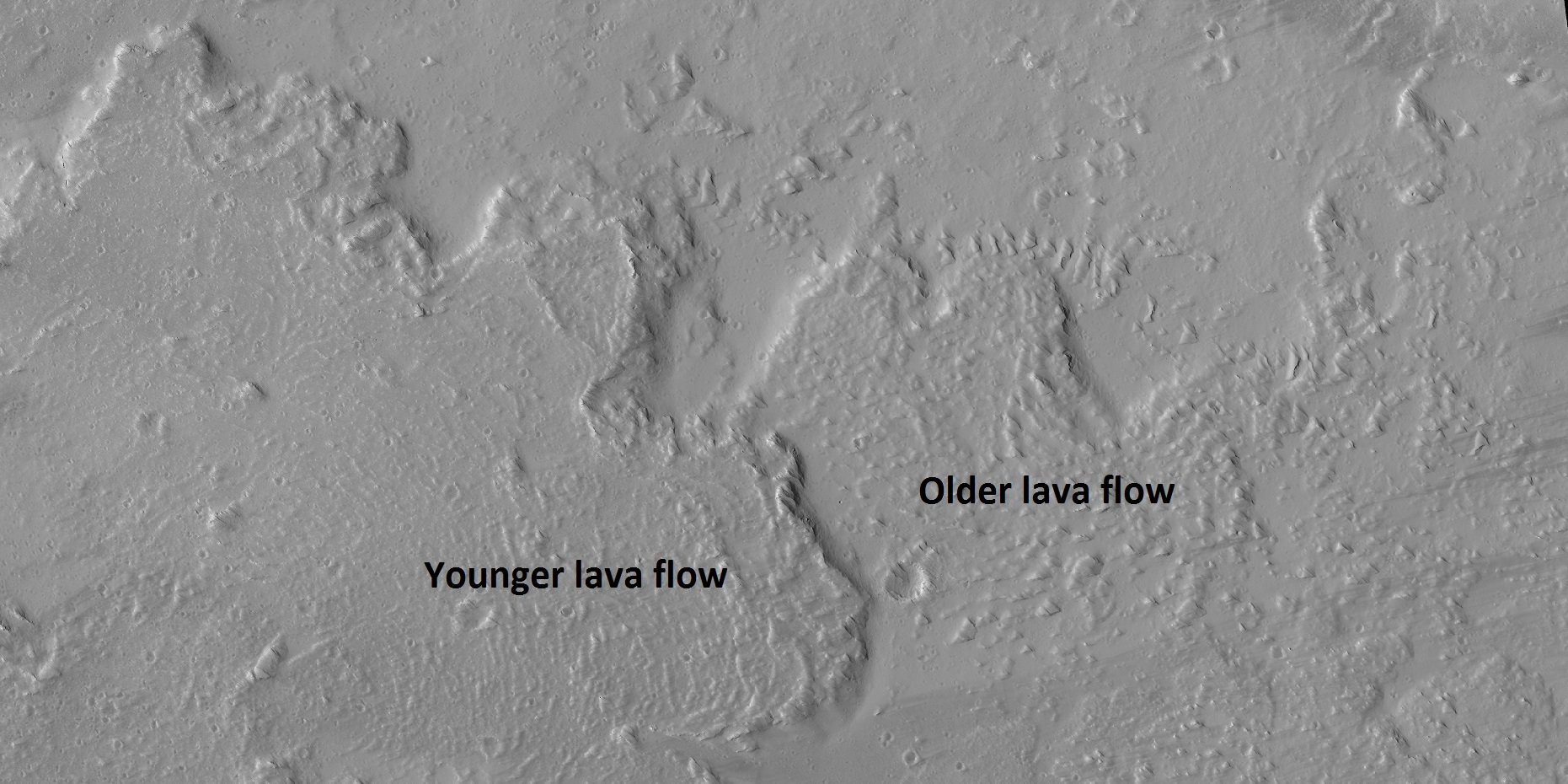
Lava flows with older and younger flows labeled, as seen by HiRISE under HiWish program

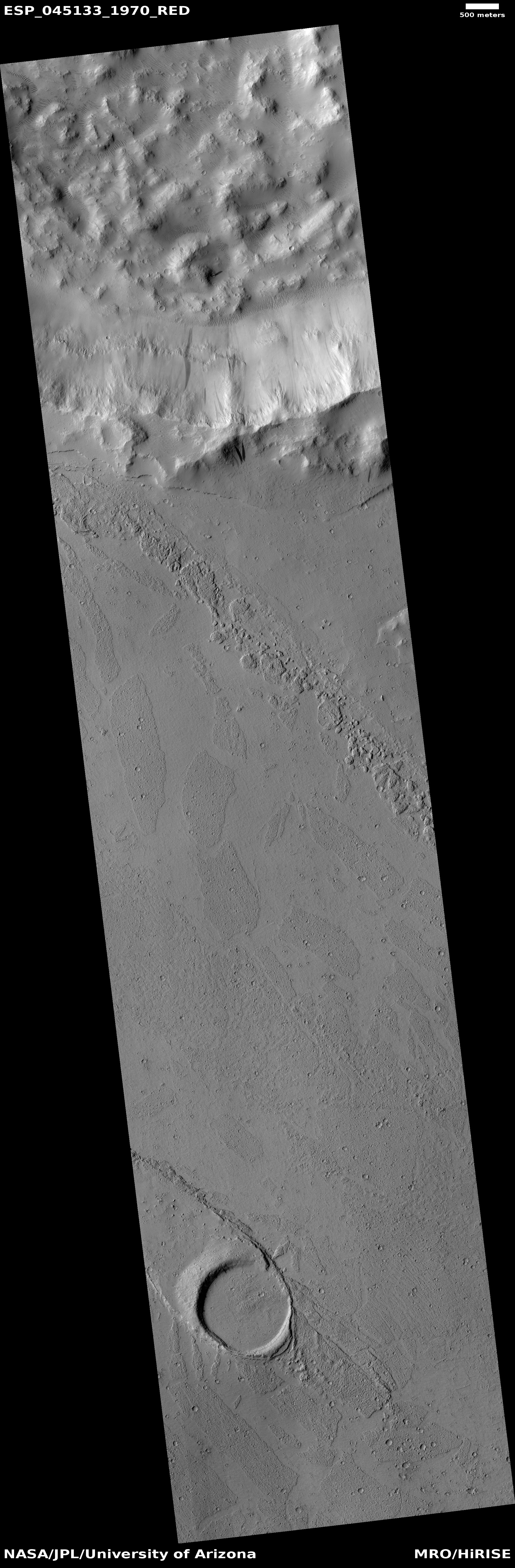
Wide view of streamlined shape and rafts of lava, as seen by HiRISE under HiWish program Location is Amazonis quadrangle.

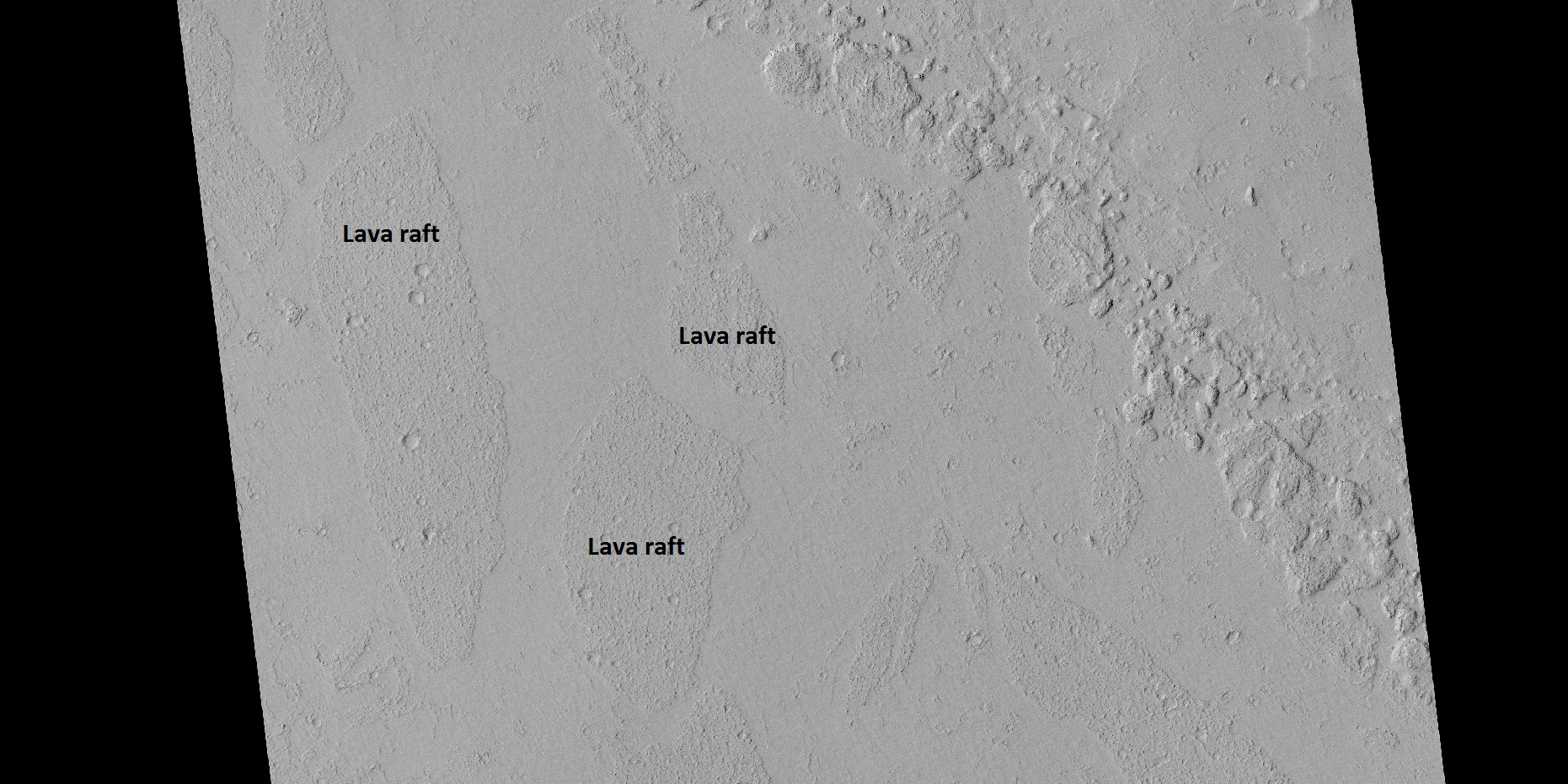
Close view of lava rafts from previous image, as seen by HiRISE under HiWish program

== Linear Ridge Networks ==
Linear ridge networks are found in various places on Mars in and around craters. Ridges often appear as mostly straight segments that intersect in a lattice-like manner. They are hundreds of meters long, tens of meters high, and several meters wide. It is thought that impacts created fractures in the surface, these fractures later acted as channels for fluids. Fluids cemented the structures. With the passage of time, surrounding material was eroded away, thereby leaving hard ridges behind. Since the ridges occur in locations with clay, these formations could serve as a marker for clay which requires water for its formation.

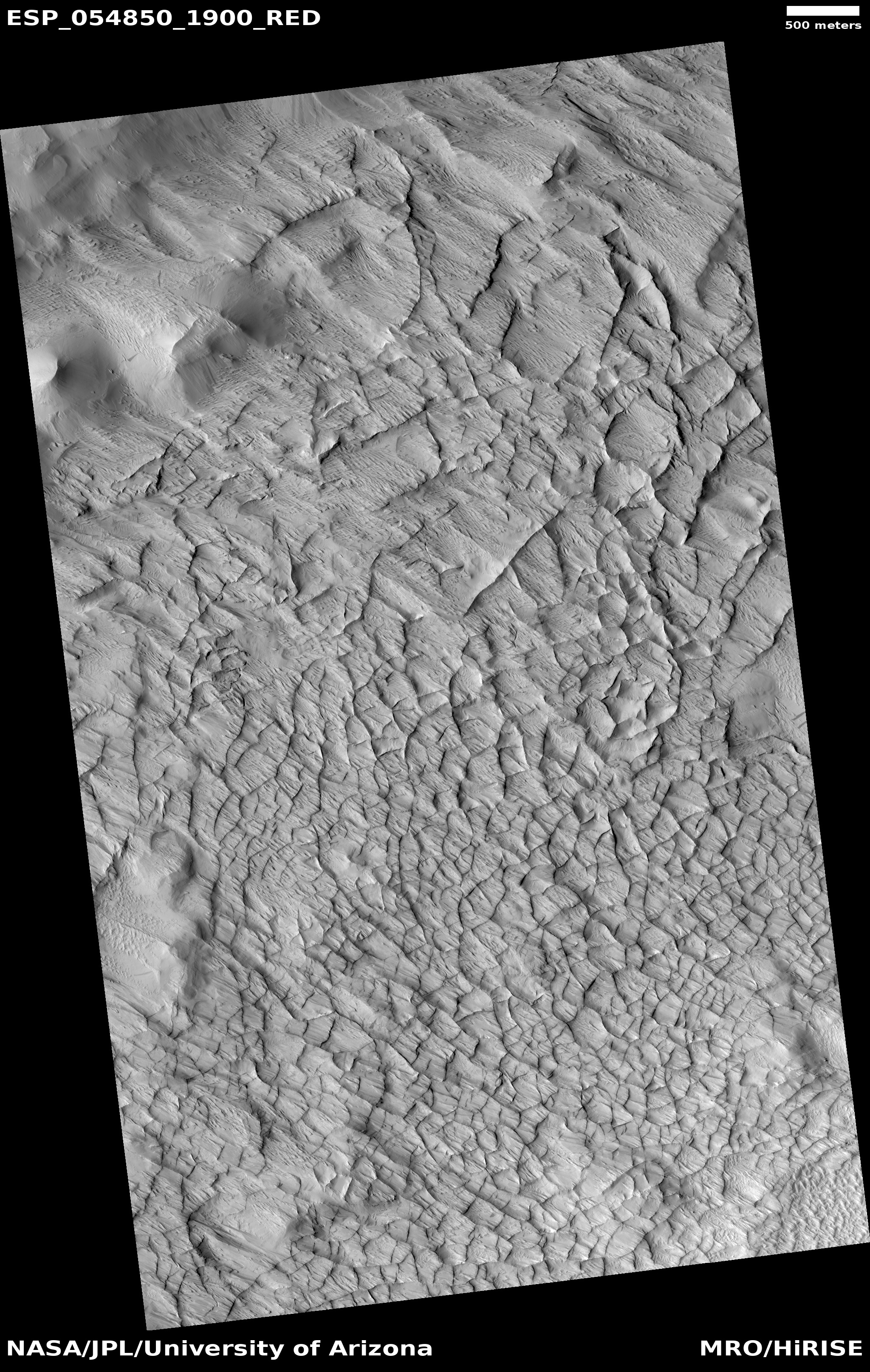
Wide view of large ridge network, as seen by HiRISE under HiWish program

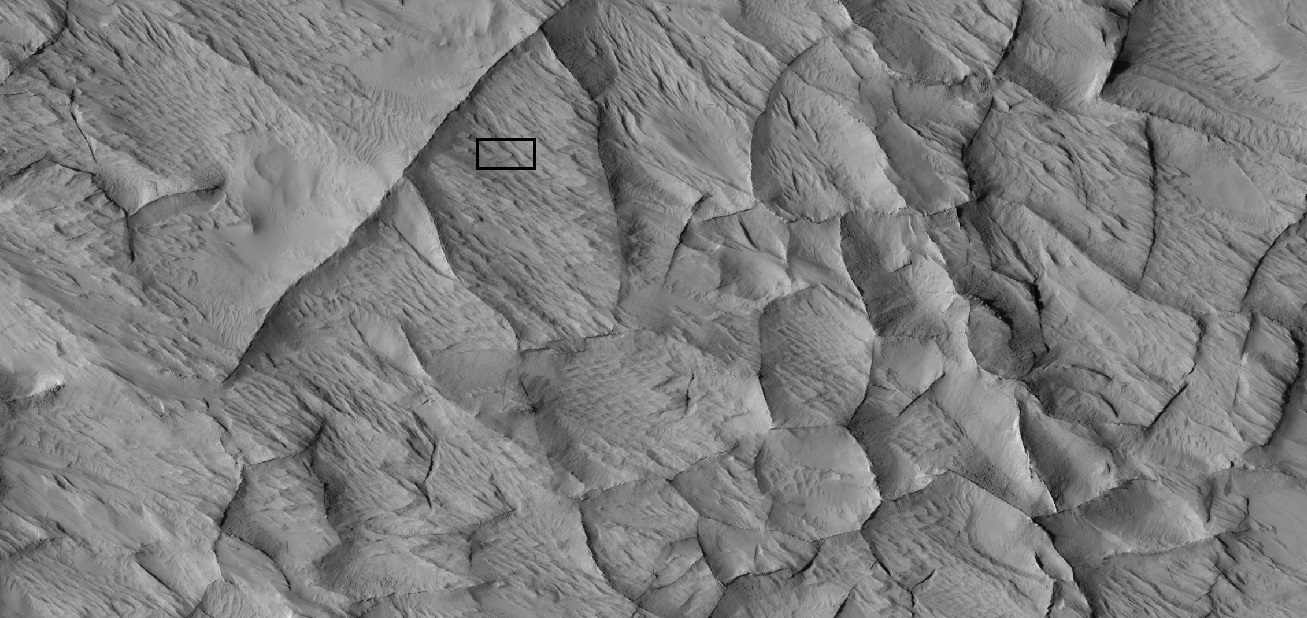
Close view of ridge network, as seen by HiRISE under HiWish program Box shows size of football field.

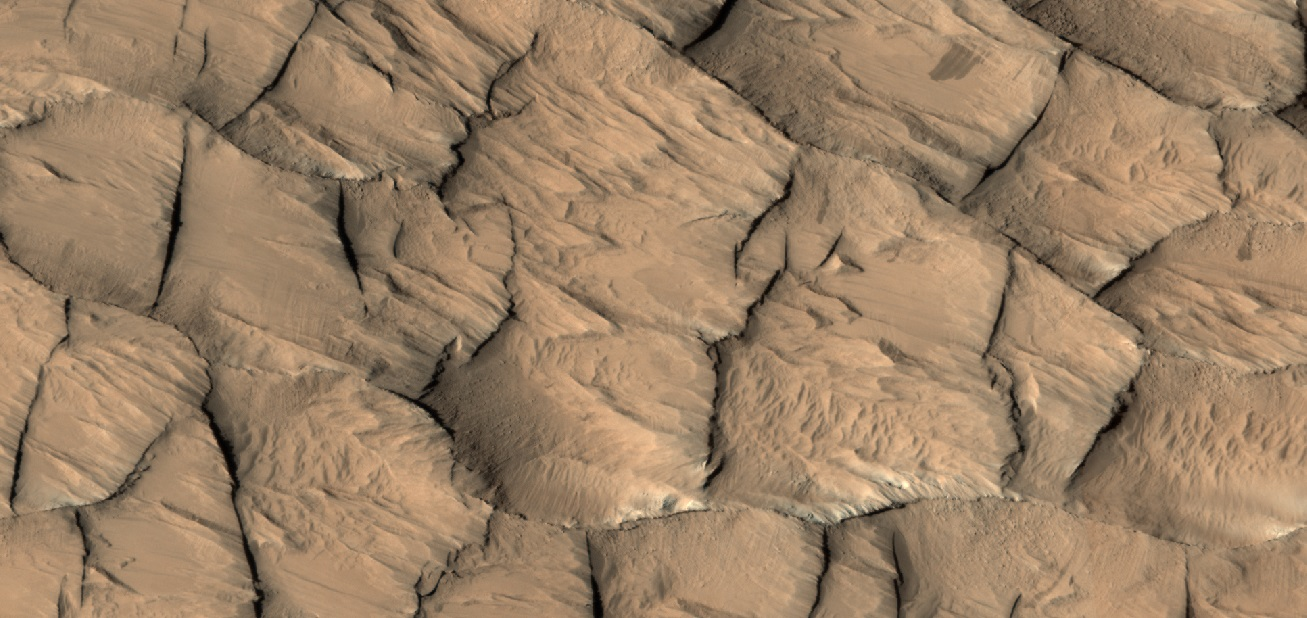
Close, color view of ridges, as seen by HiRISE under HiWish program
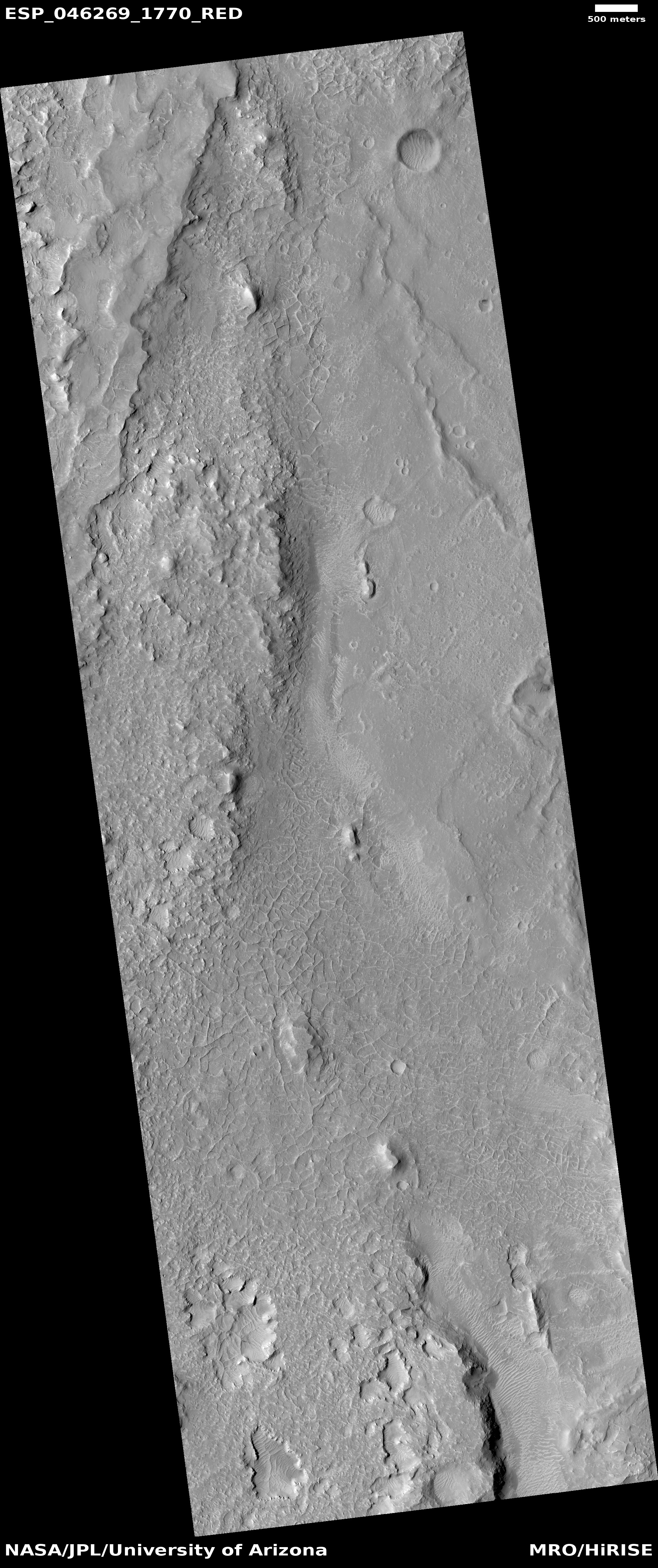
Wide view of ridge networks, as seen by HiRISE under HiWish program Parts of this are enlarged in next three images.

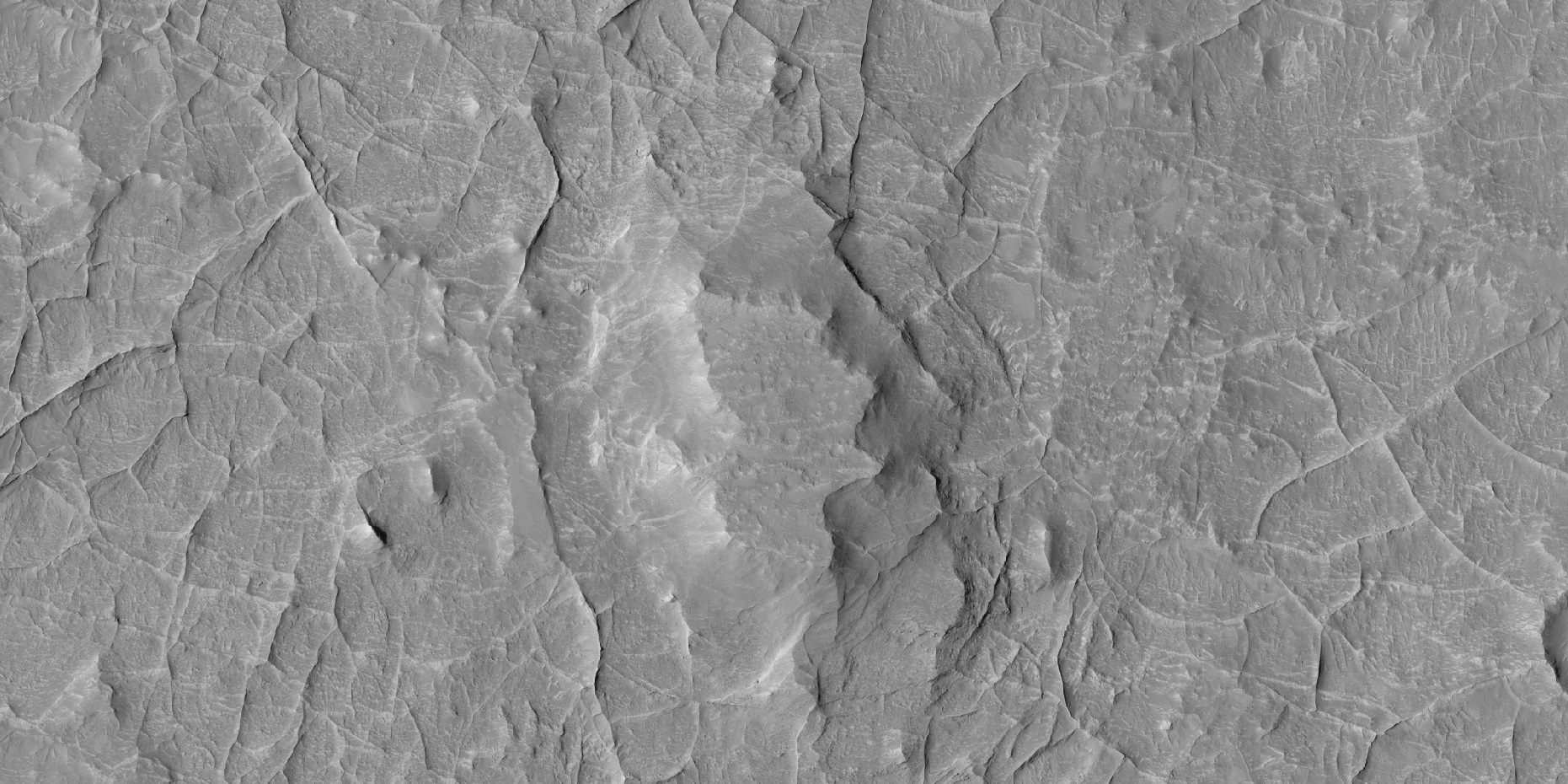
Close view of ridge networks, as seen by HiRISE under HiWish program Notice that the ridges appear in a lower level, but not in the top unit that forms a mound. That means that the time when the ridges were made was before the upper layer.

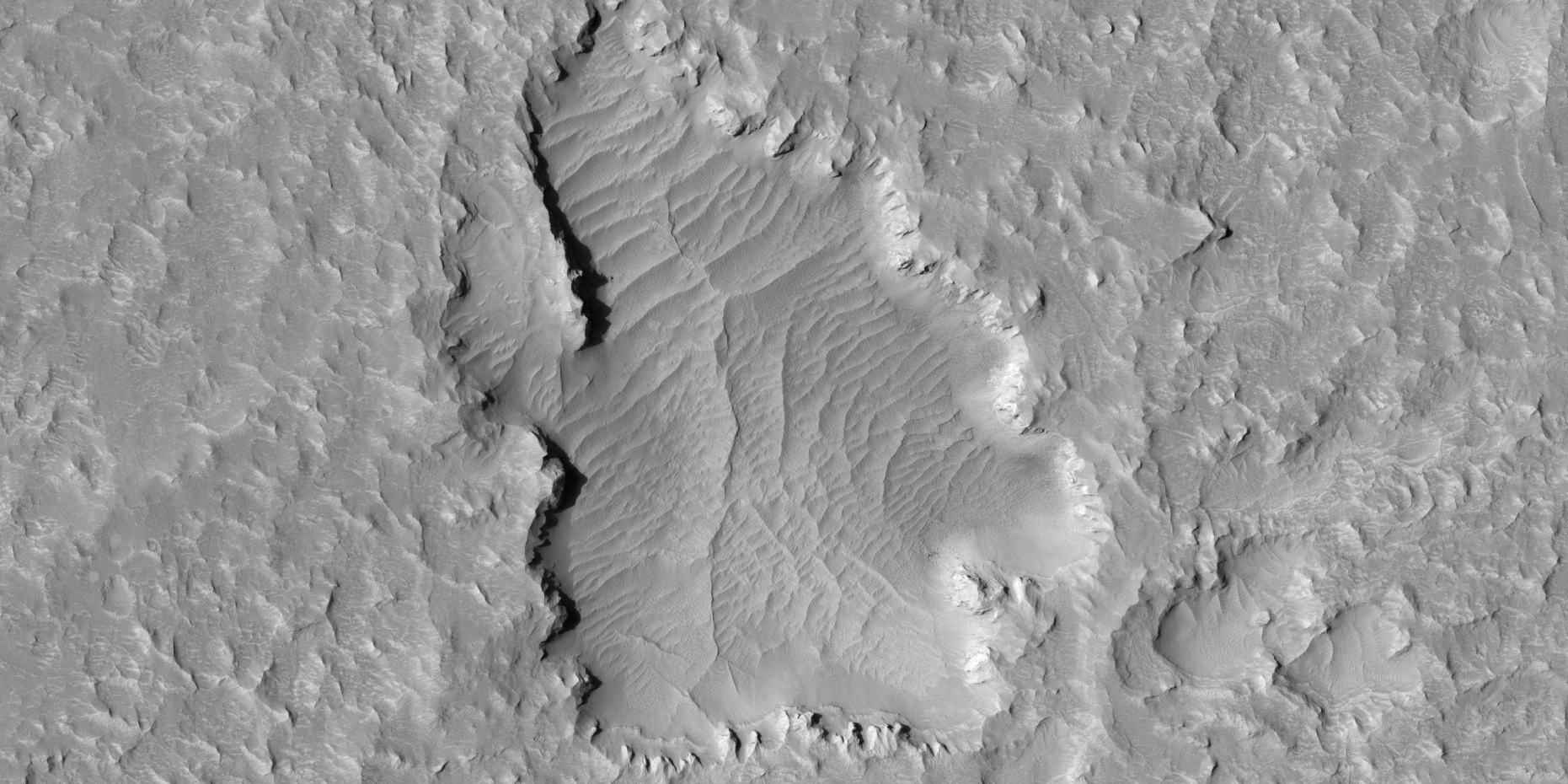
Close view of ridge networks, as seen by HiRISE under HiWish program Since some ridges are at the bottom of the depression, the ridges may be from a lower layer.
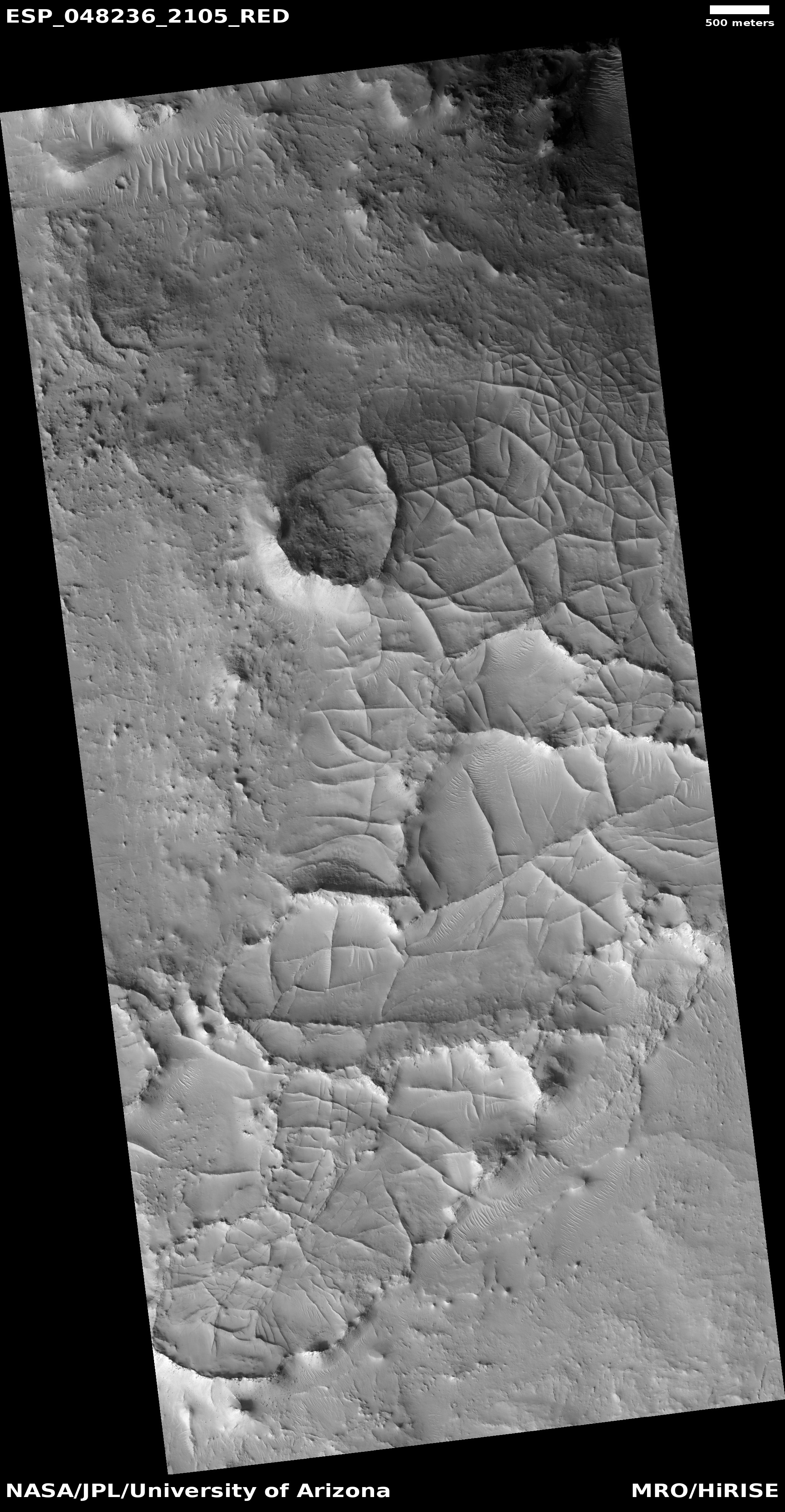
Wide view of network of ridges, as seen by HiRISE under HiWish program Portions of this image are enlarged in following images. Location is the Casius quadrangle.

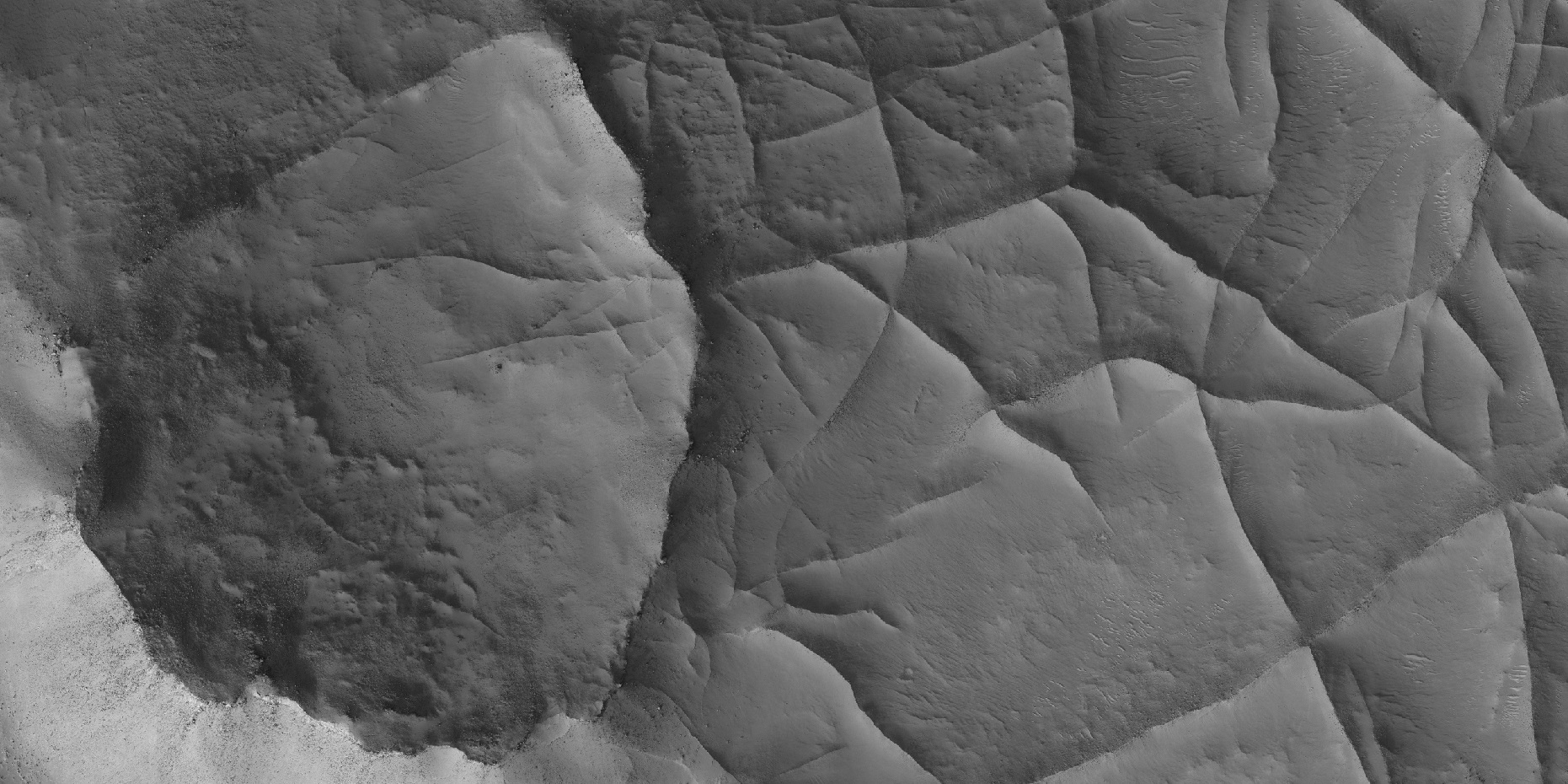
Close view of network of ridges, as seen by HiRISE under HiWish program This is an enlargement of a previous image.

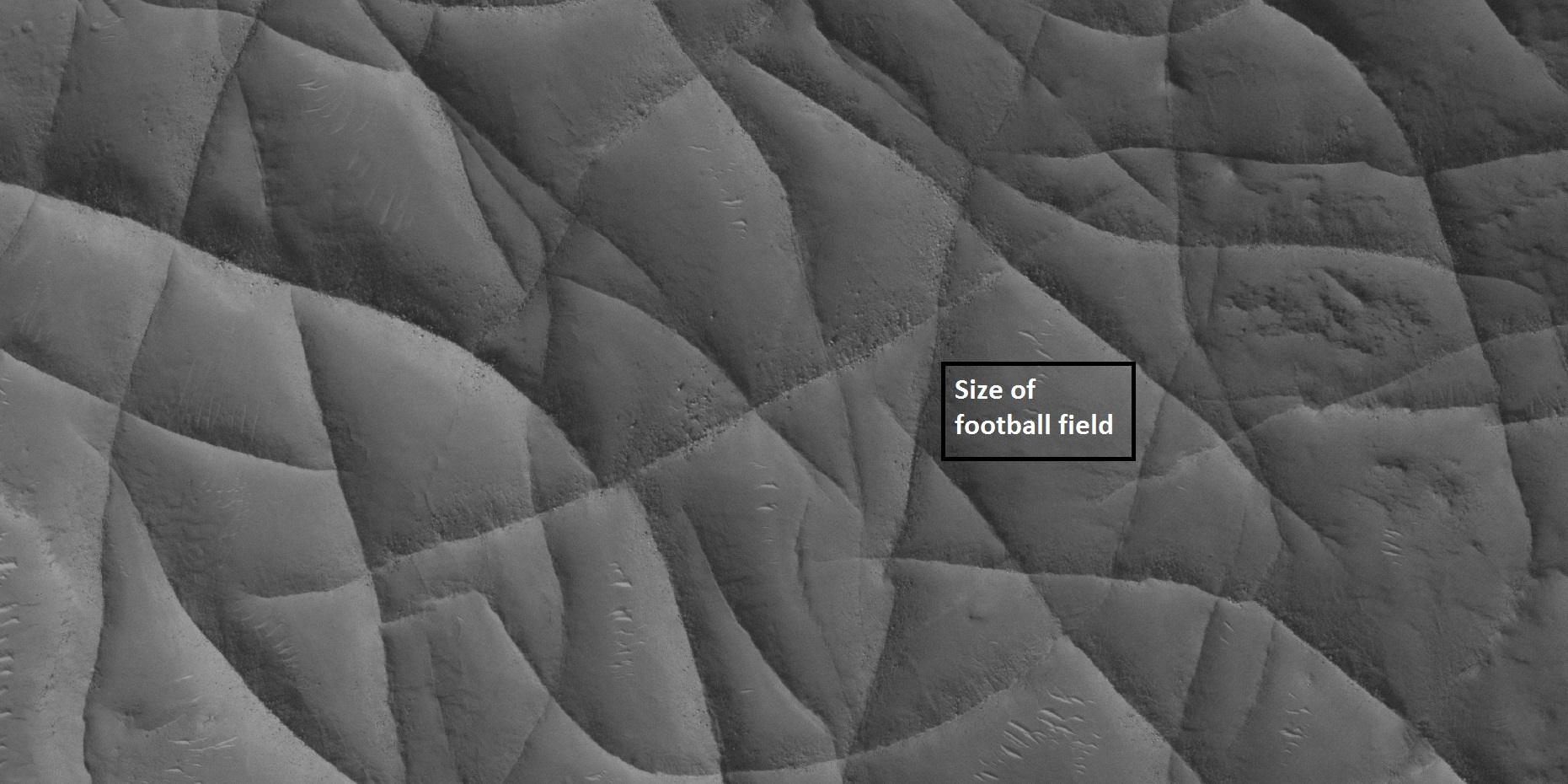
Close view of network of ridges, as seen by HiRISE under HiWish program This is an enlargement of a previous image. Box shows the size of a football field.

== Fractures forming blocks ==
In places large fractures break up surfaces. Sometimes straight edges are formed and large cubes are created by the fractures.

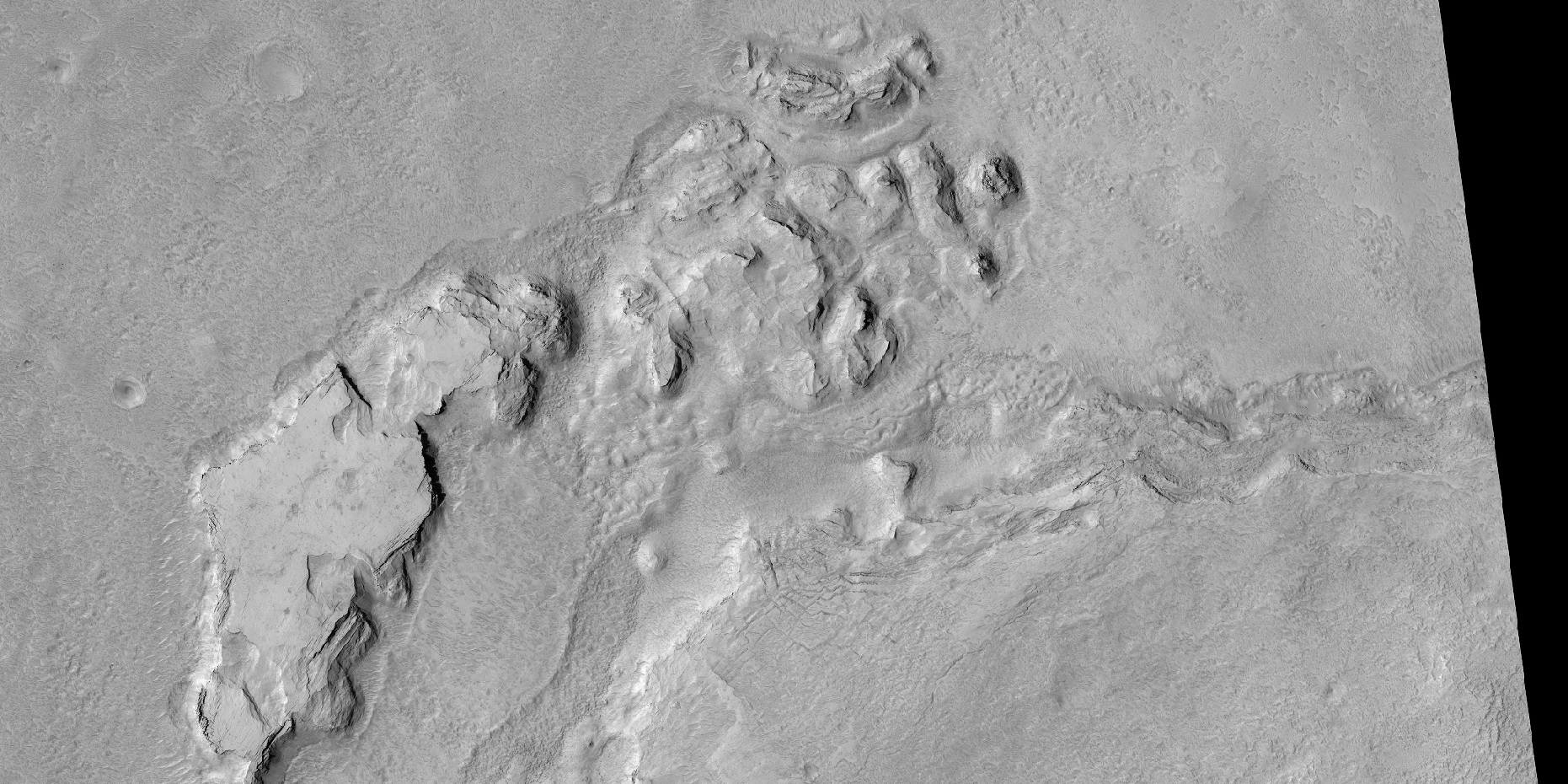
Wide view of mesas that are forming fractures, as seen by HiRISE under HiWish program. Location is North Arabia Terra in Ismenius Lacus quadrangle.

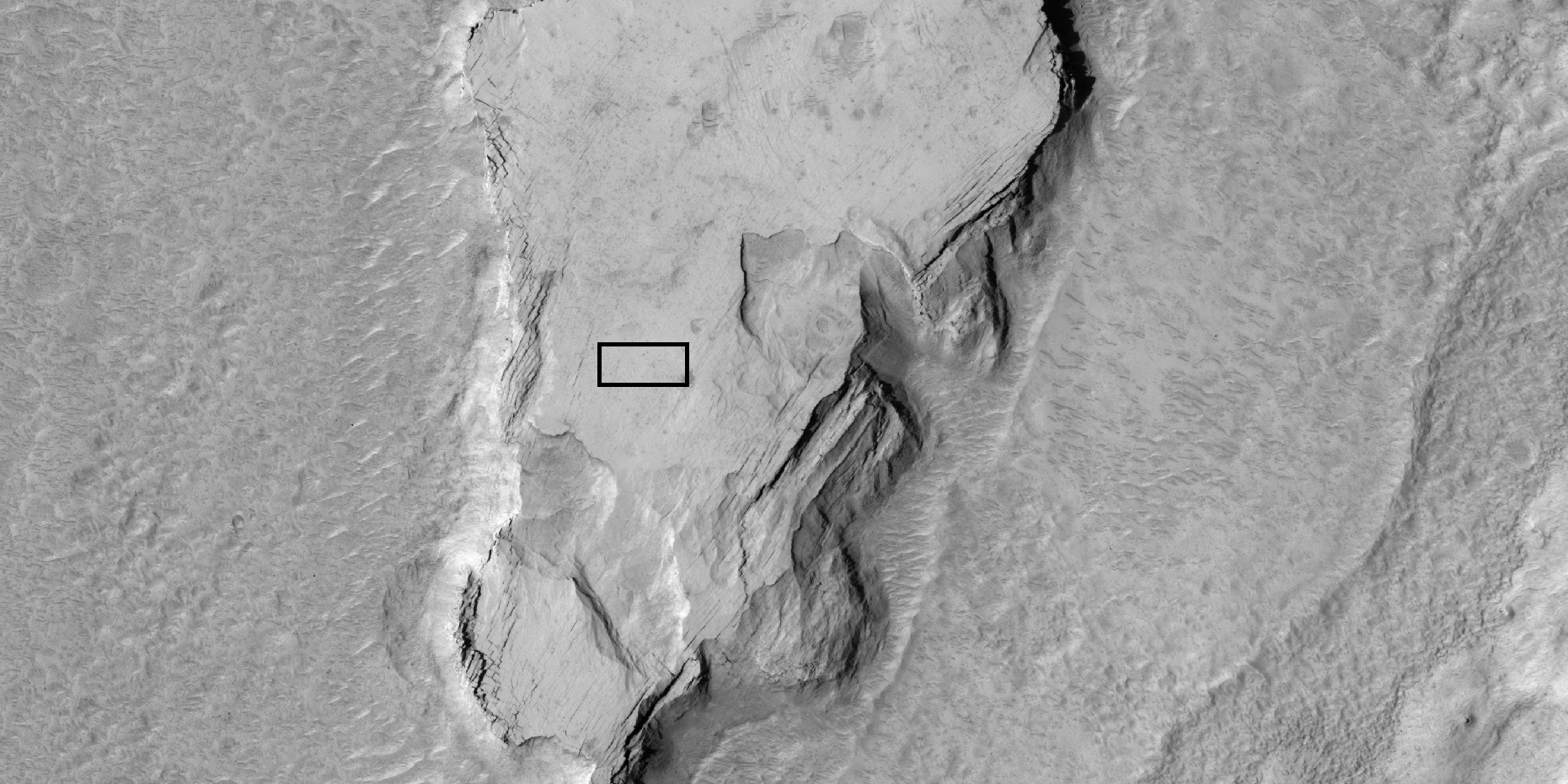
Enlarged view of a part of previous image, as seen by HiRISE under HiWish program. The rectangle represents the size of a football field.

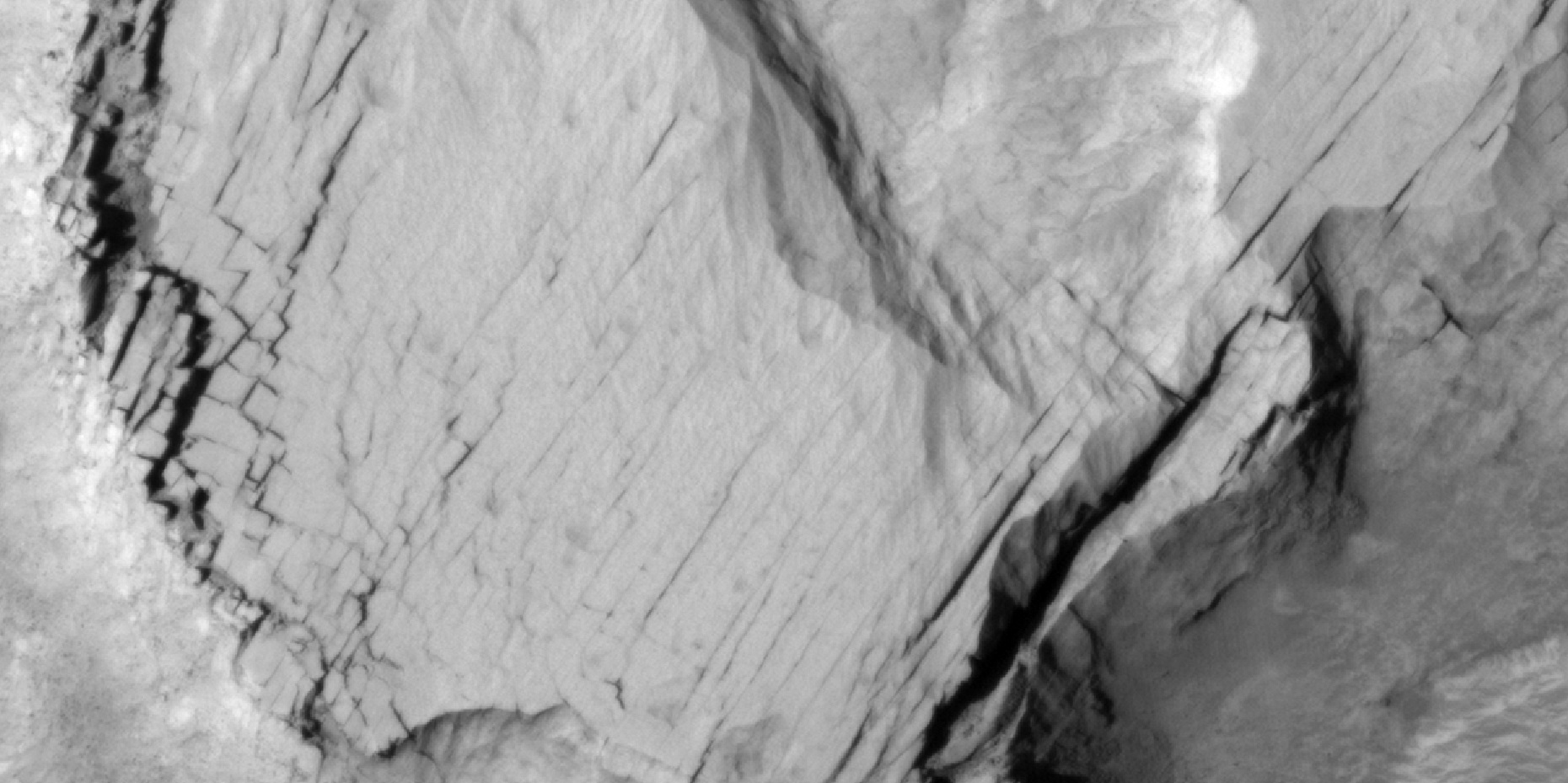
Close-up of blocks being formed, as seen by HiRISE under HiWish program as seen by HiRISE under HiWish program.

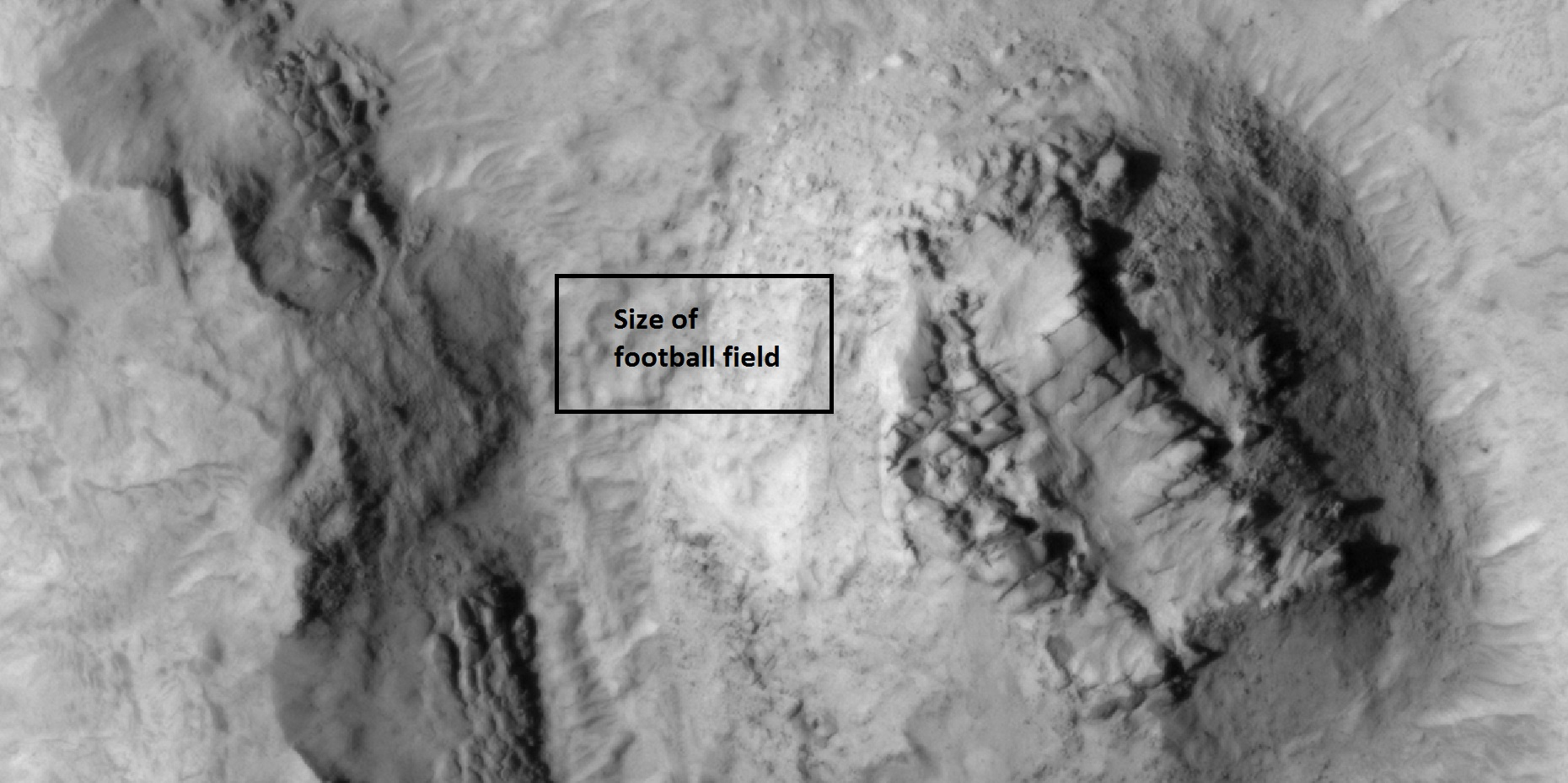
Close-up of blocks being formed, as seen by HiRISE under HiWish program The rectangle represents the size of a football field, so blocks are the size of buildings.

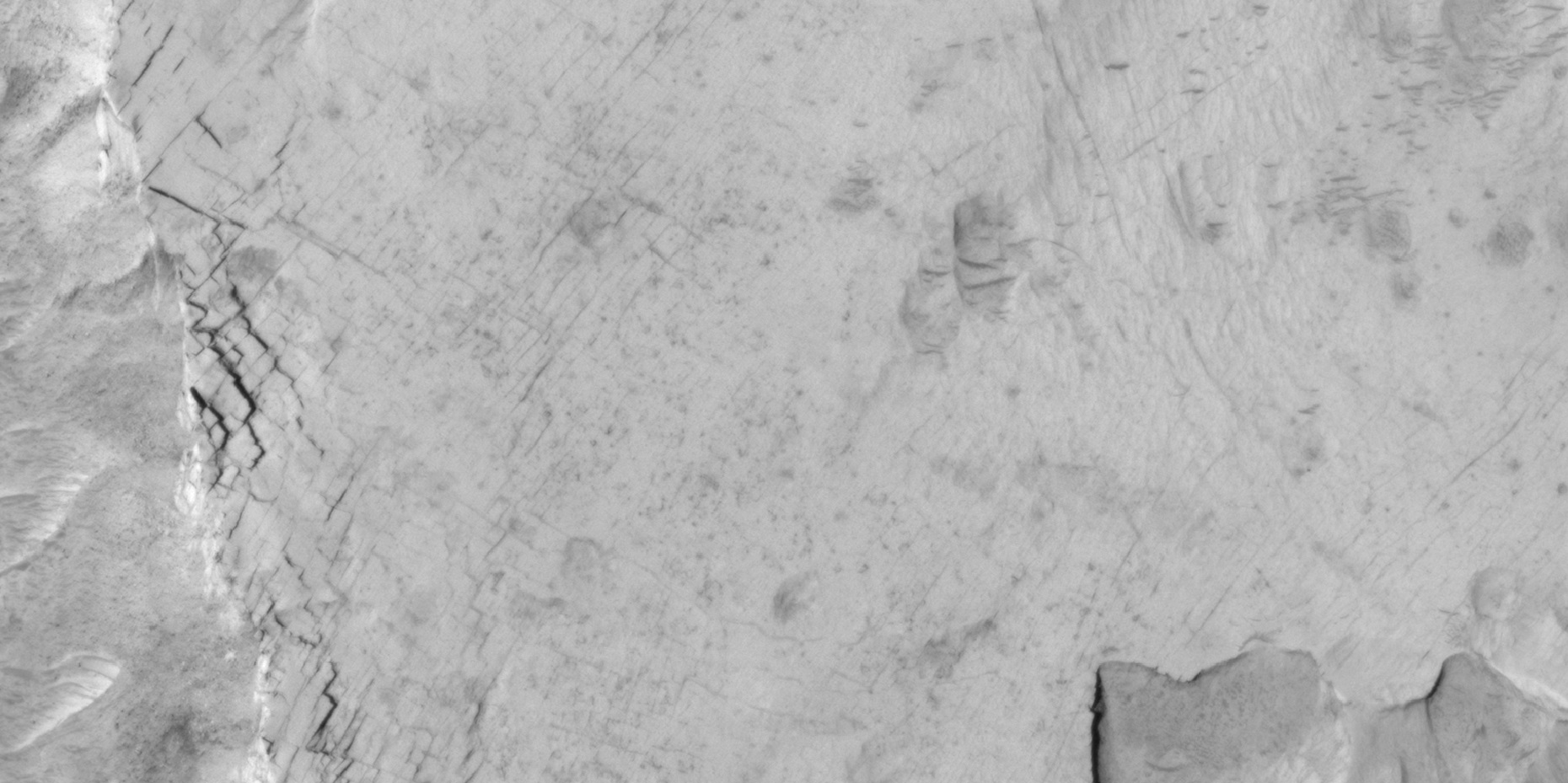
Close-up of blocks being formed, as seen by HiRISE under HiWish program as seen by HiRISE under HiWish program. Many long fractures are visible on the surface.

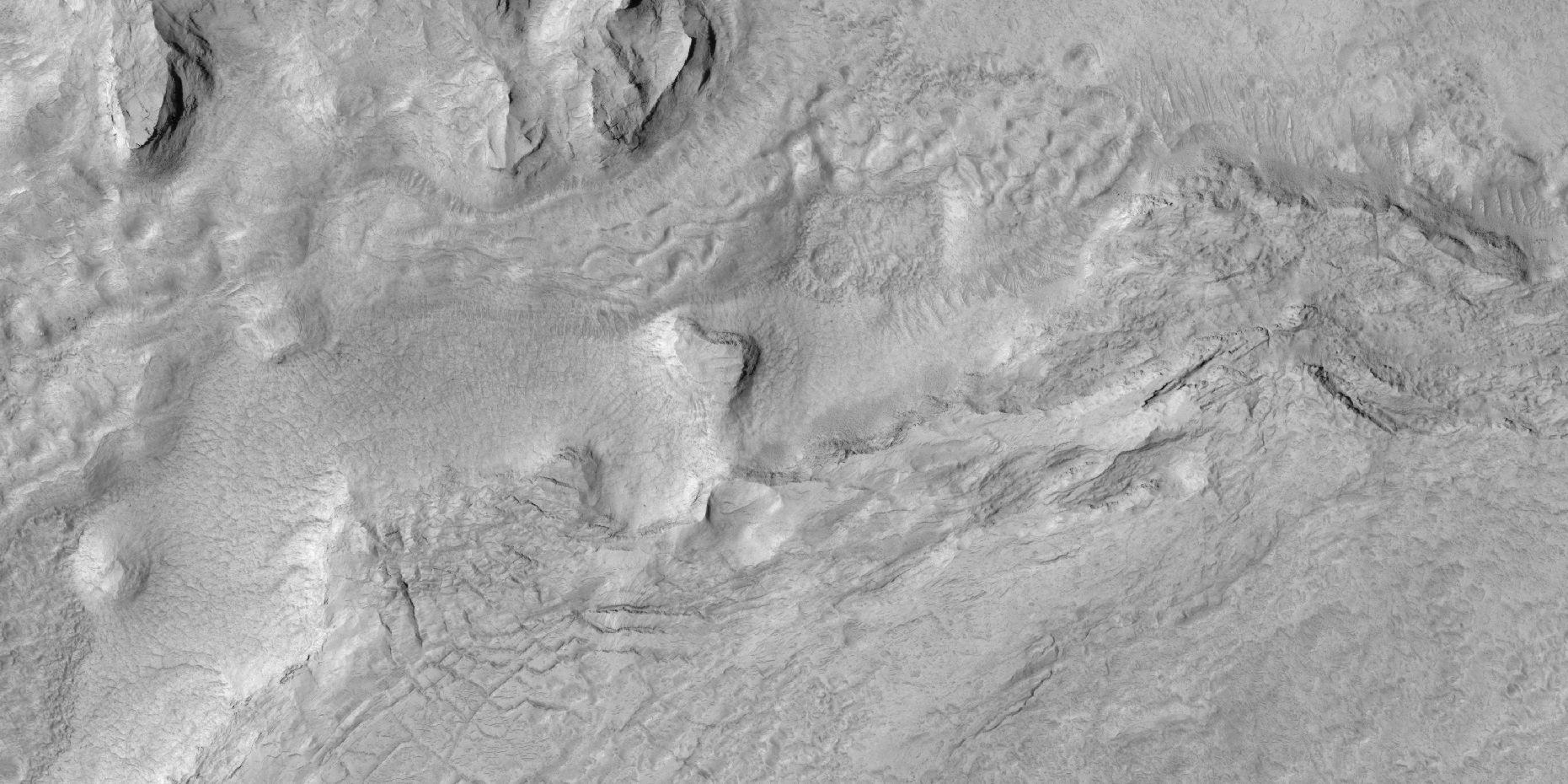
Surface breaking up, as seen by HiRISE under HiWish program as seen by HiRISE under HiWish program. Near the top the surface is eroding into brain terrain.

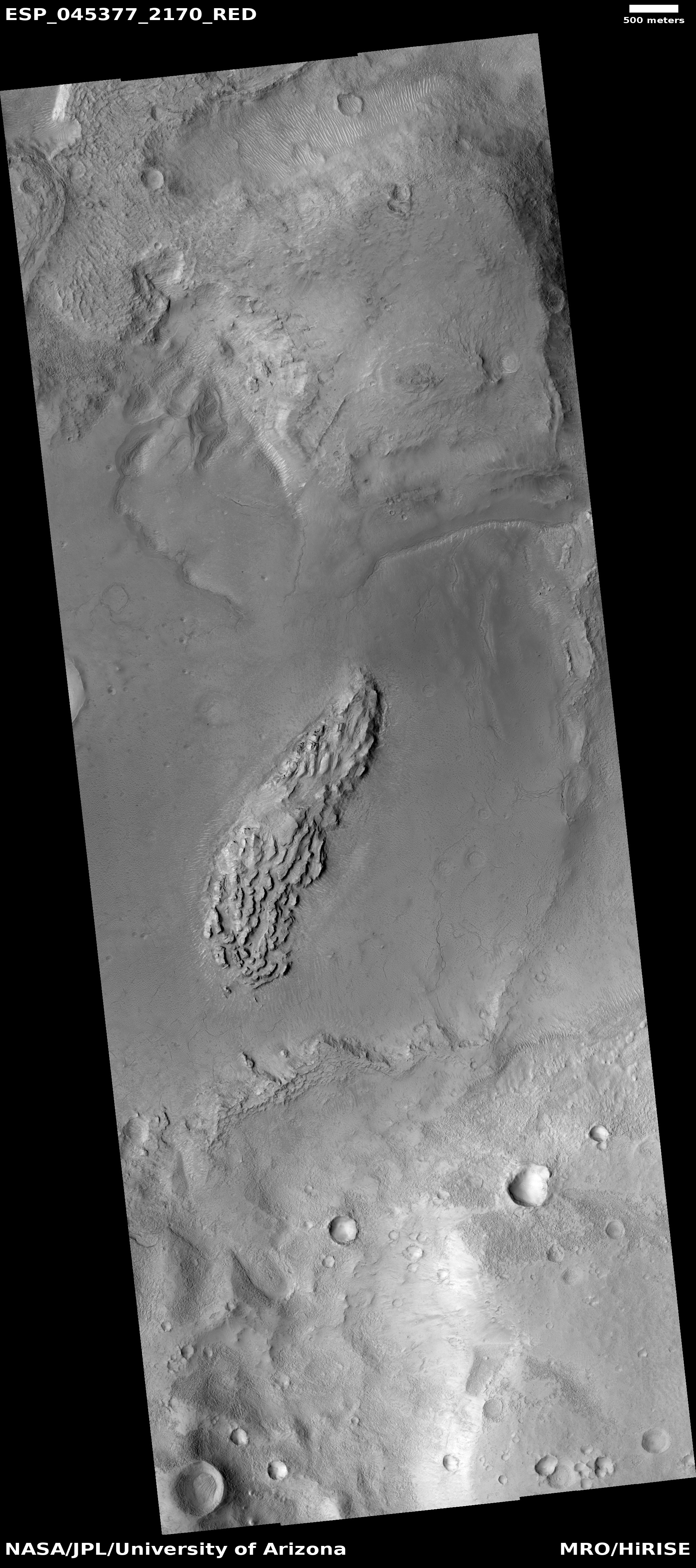
Wide view showing light-toned feature that is breaking into blocks, as seen by HiRISE under HiWish program

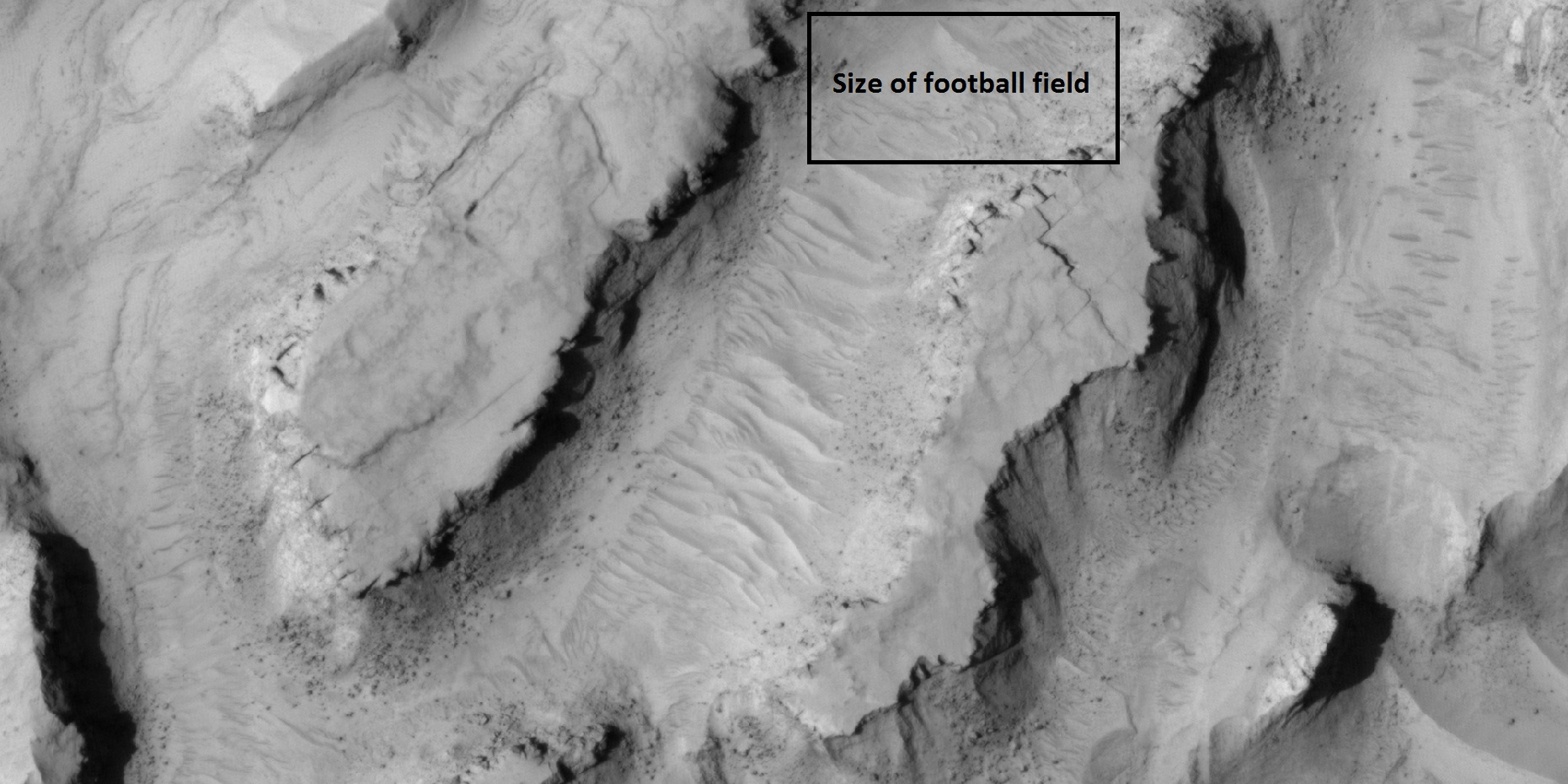
Close view showing blocks being formed, as seen by HiRISE under HiWish program Note: this is an enlargement of the previous image. Box represents size of football field.

== Volcanoes under ice ==
There is evidence that volcanoes sometimes erupt under ice, as they do on Earth at times. What seems to happen it that much ice melts, the water goes away, and then the surface cracks and collapses. These exhibit concentric fractures and large pieces of ground that seemed to have been pulled apart. Sites like this may have recently had held liquid water, hence they may be fruitful places to search for evidence of life.

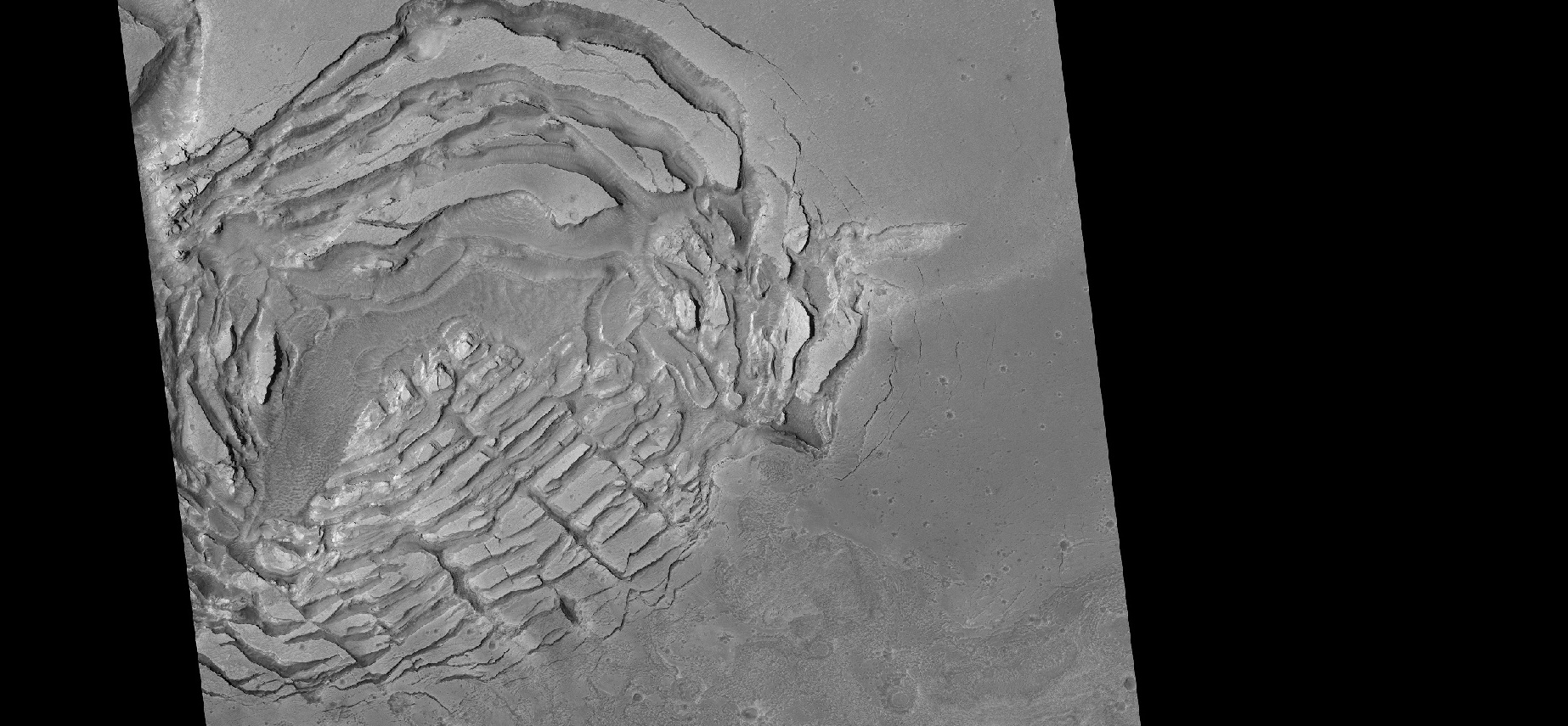
Large group of concentric cracks, as seen by HiRISE, under HiWish program Location is Ismenius Lacus quadrangle. Cracks were formed by a volcano under ice.

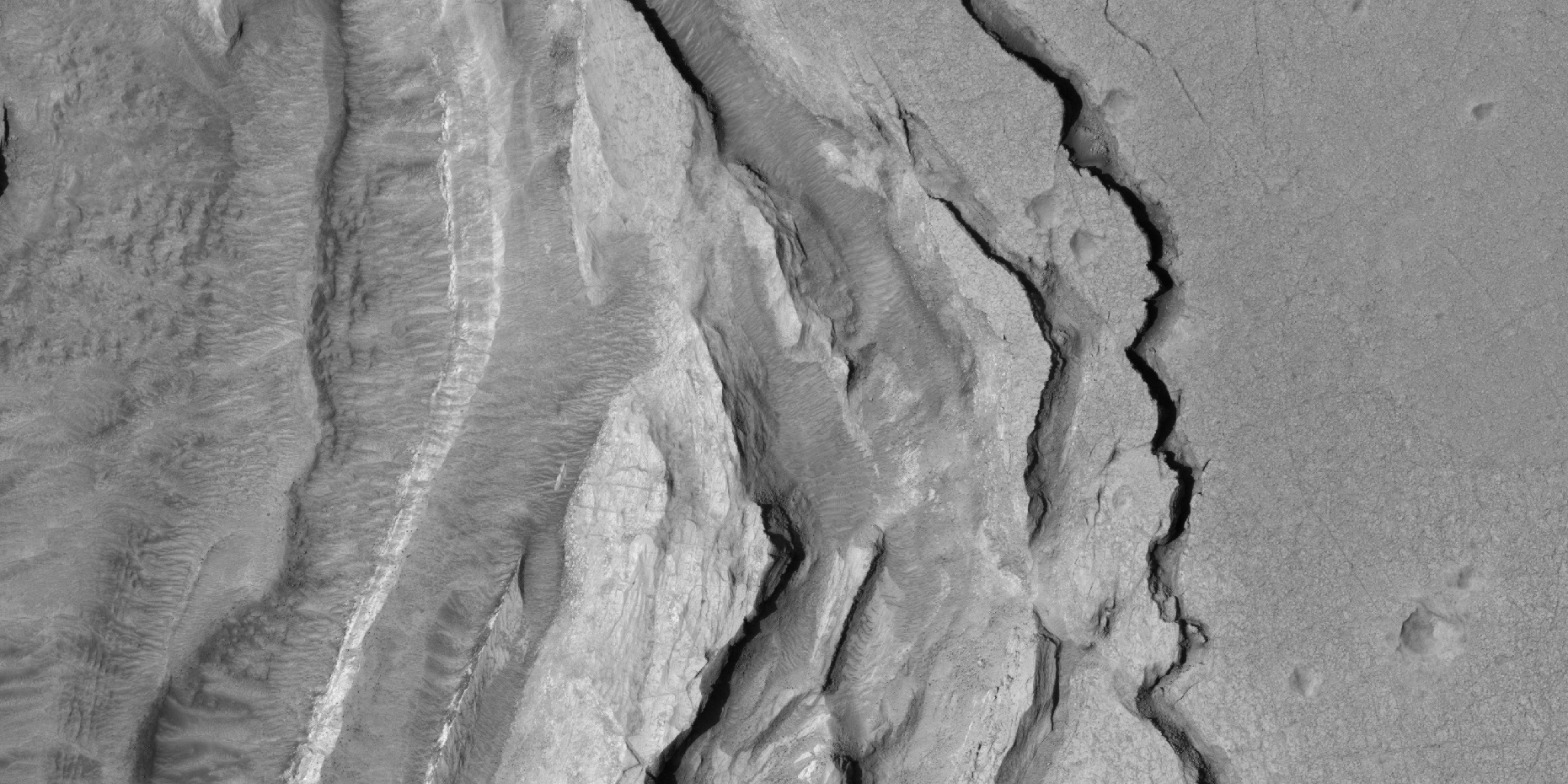
Tilted layers formed when ground collapsed, as seen by HiRISE, under HiWish program

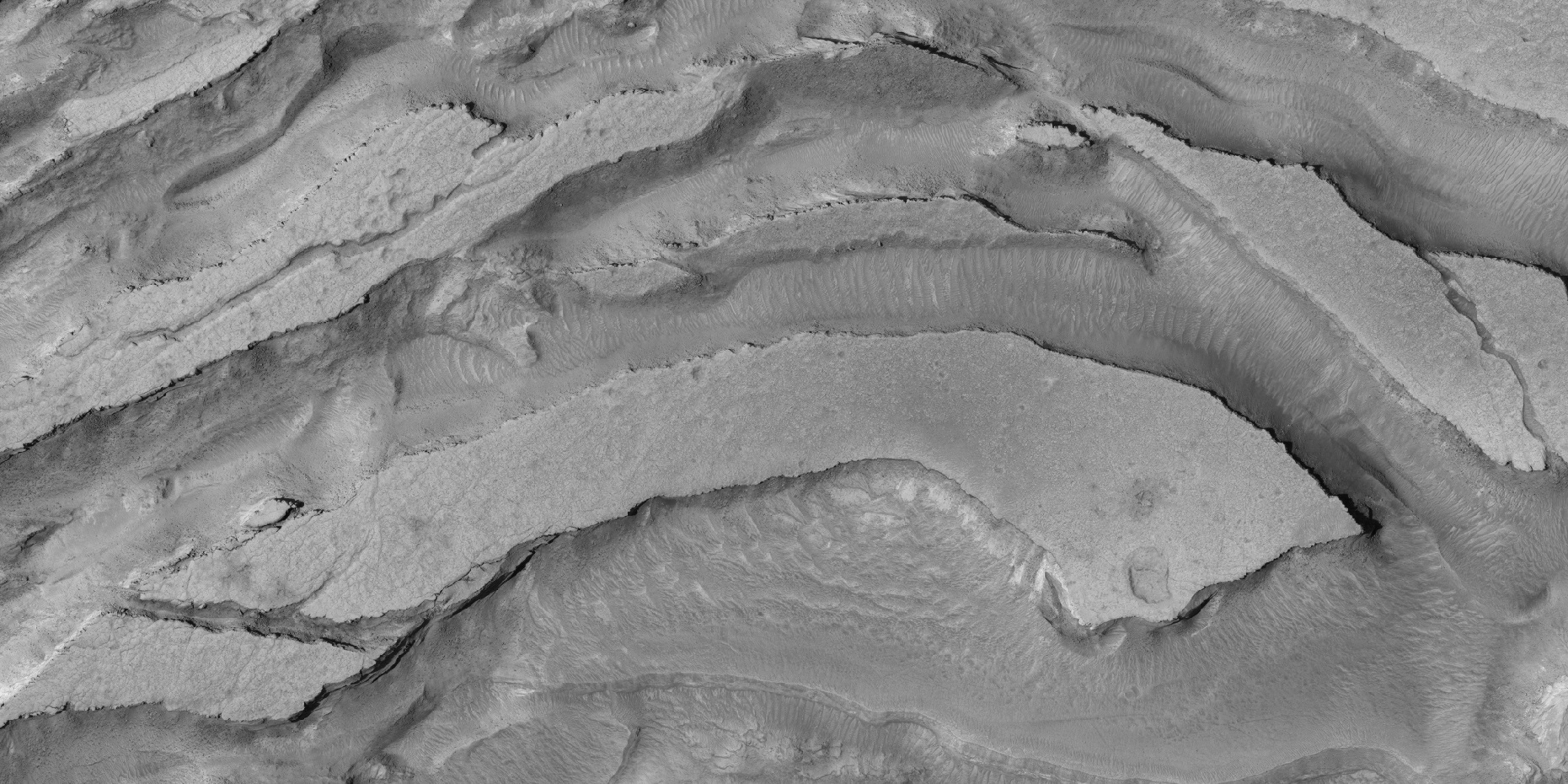
Tilted layers formed from ground collapse, as seen by HiRISE, under HiWish program.

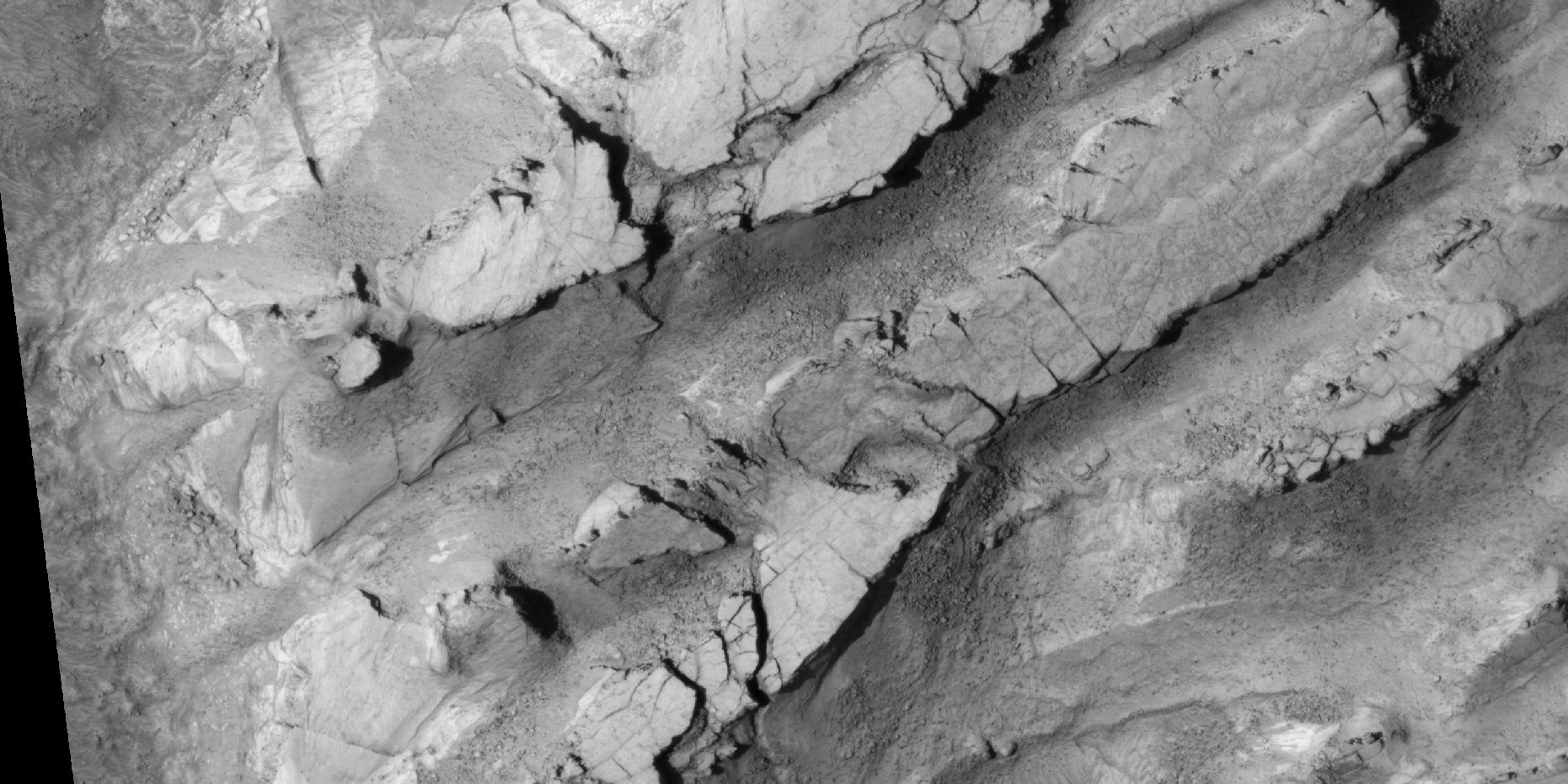
Mesas breaking up into blocks, as seen by HiRISE, under HiWish program.

== Noctis Labyrinthus ==
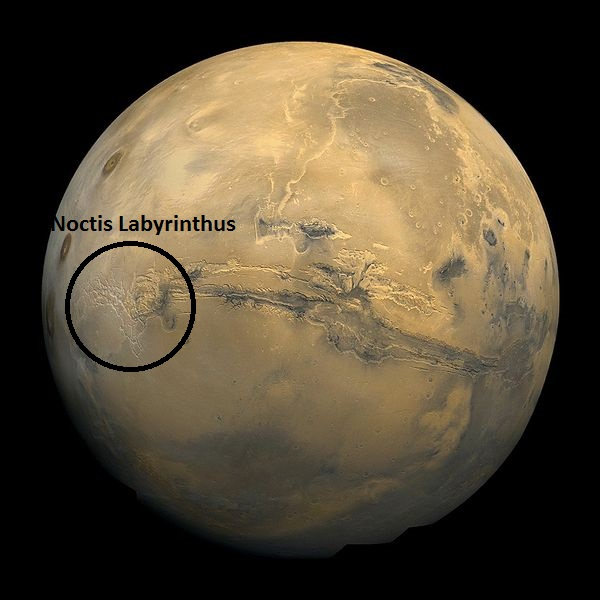
Moasic of Viking 1 Orbiter pictures showing location of Noctus Labyrinthus

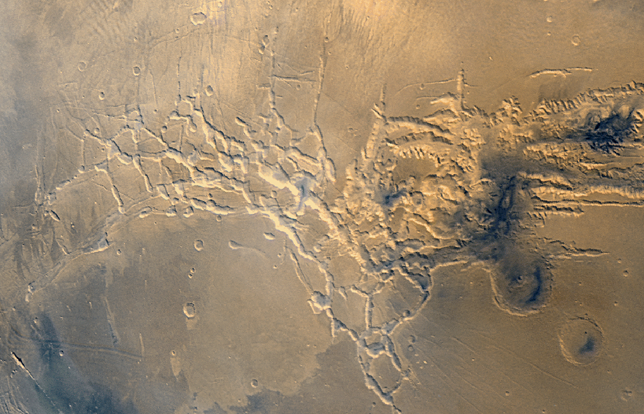
Noctis Labyrinthus, as seen by Viking 1

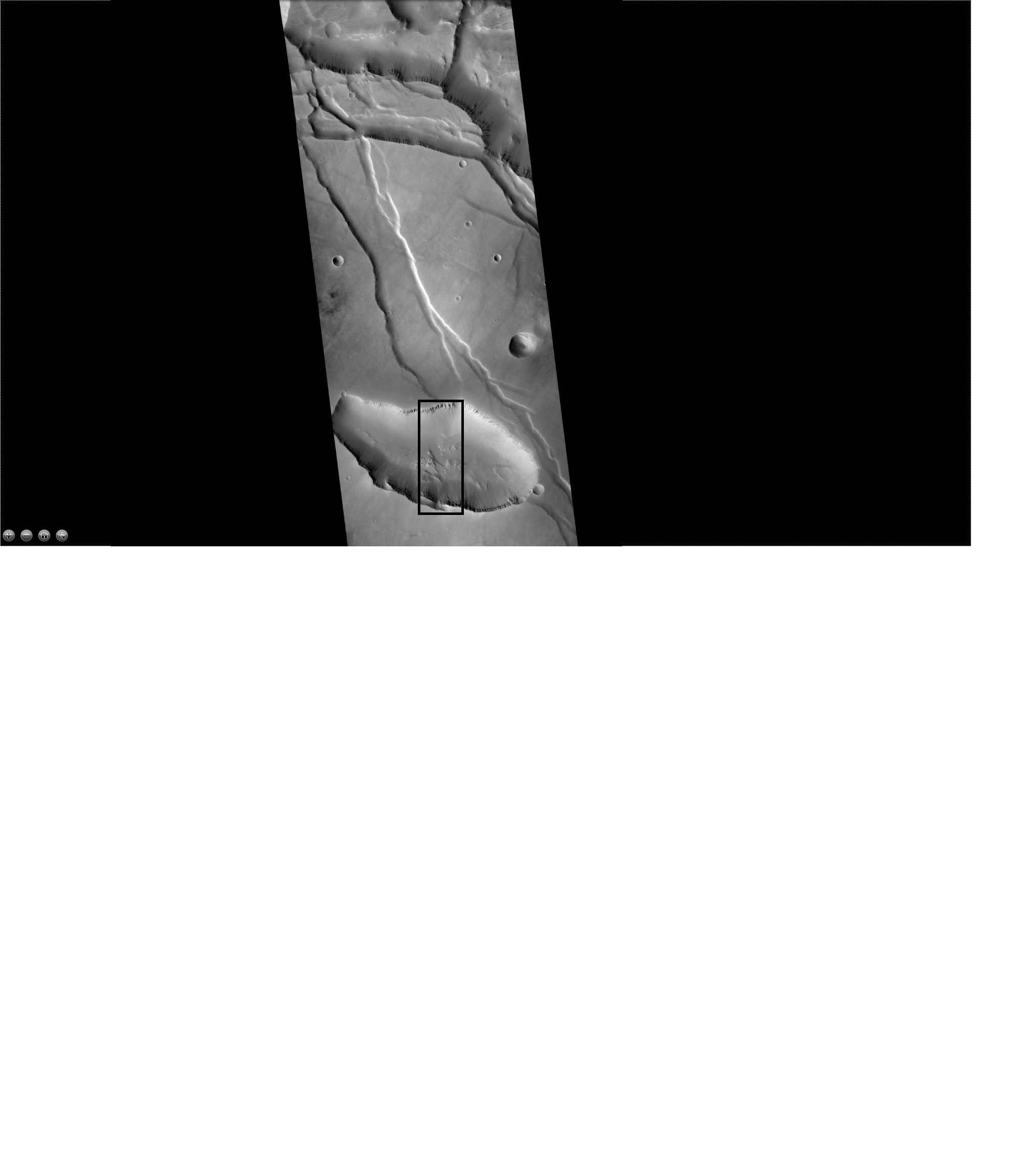
Part of Noctis Labyrinthus as seen by CTX Box shows the area covered by the following HiRISE image

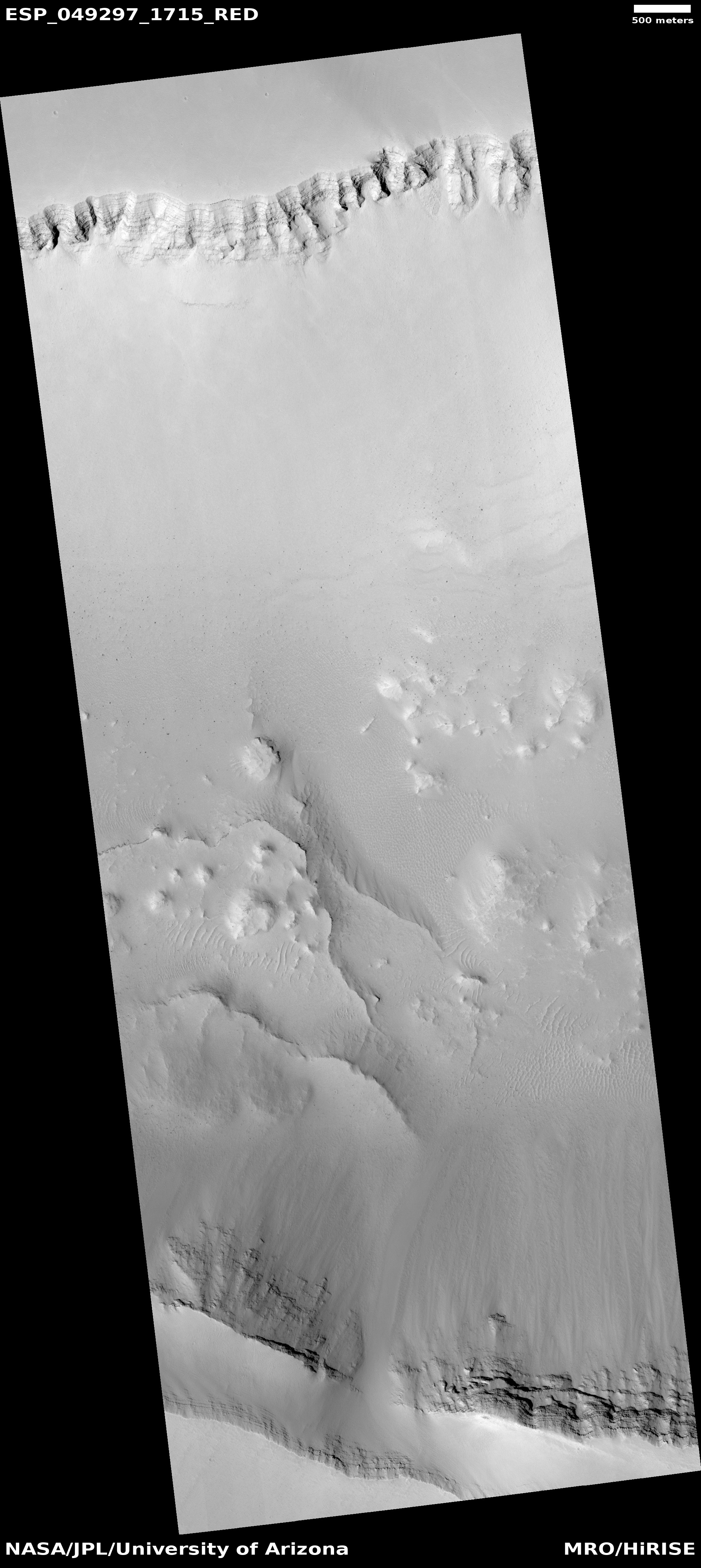
North and south walls of part of Noctis Labyrinthus, as seen by HiRISE under HiWish program

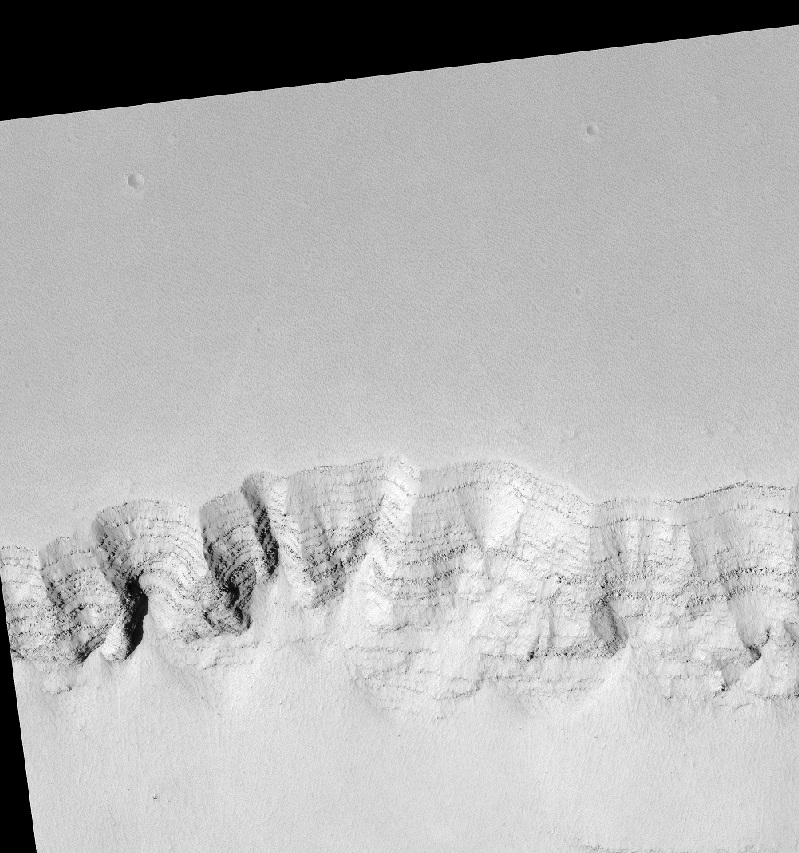
Wide view of north wall of part of Noctis Labyrinthus, as seen by HiRISE under HiWish program

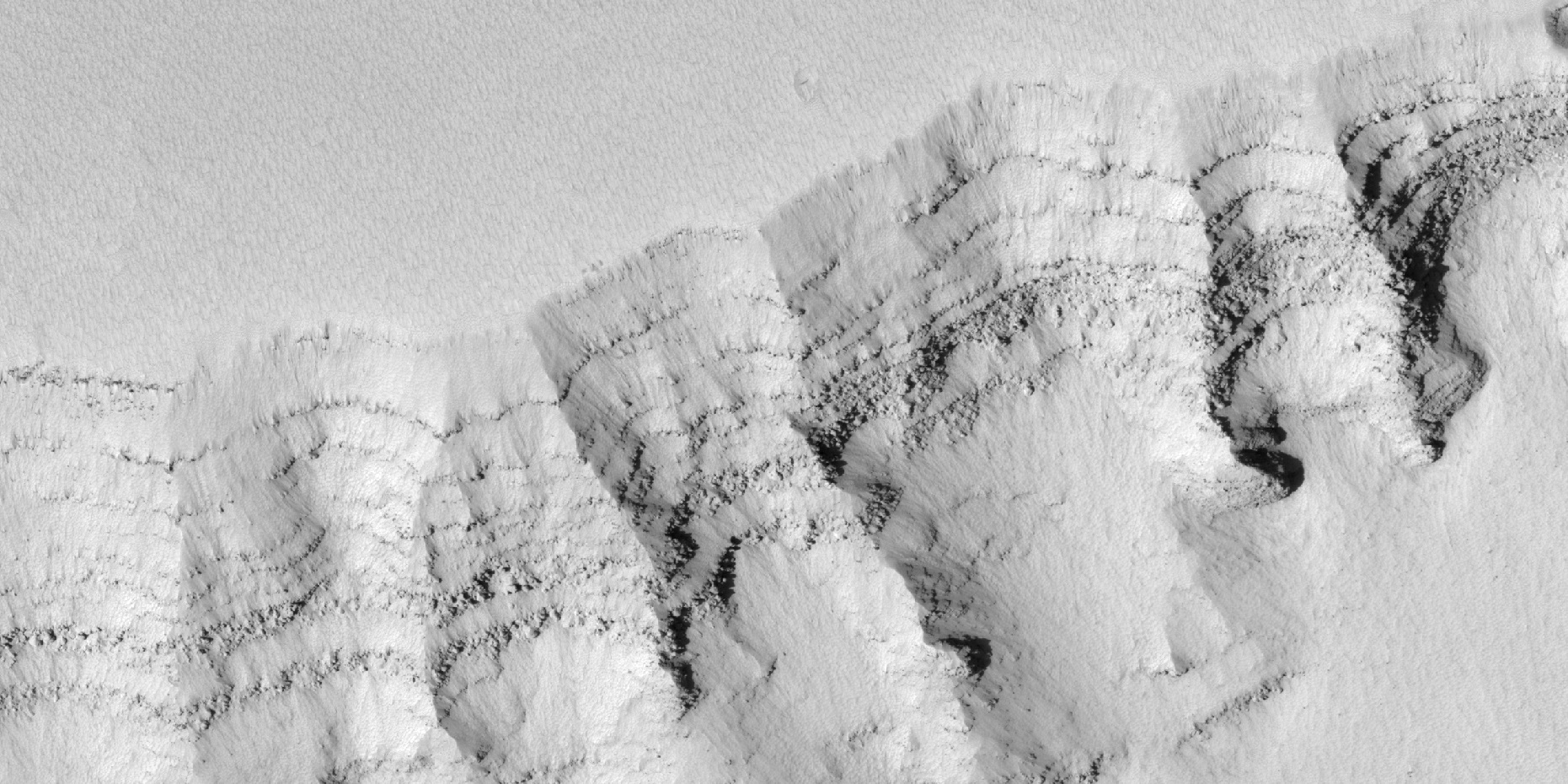
Close view of north wall of part of Noctis Labyrinthus, as seen by HiRISE under HiWish program

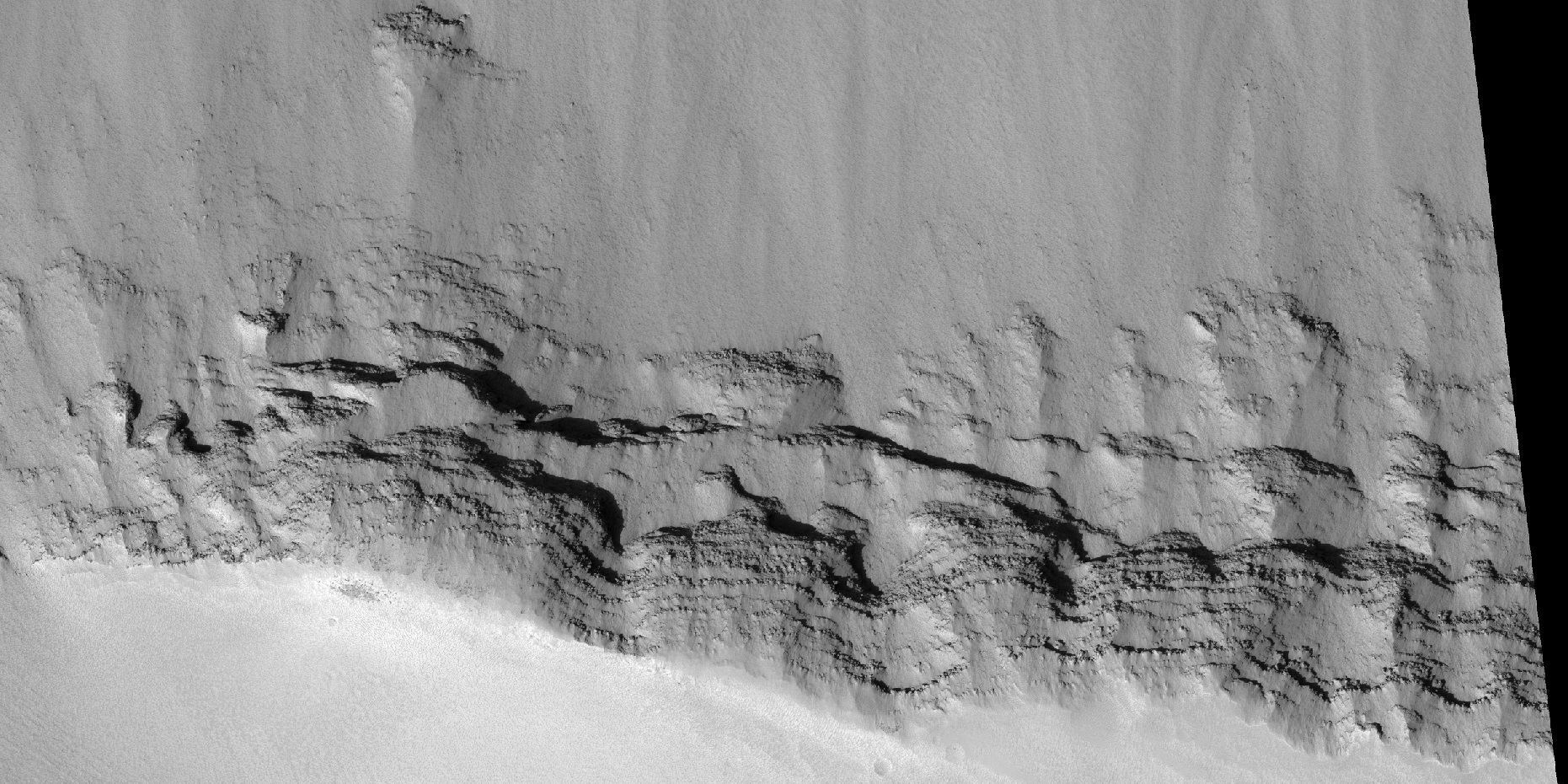
Close view of south wall of part of Noctis Labyrinthus, as seen by HiRISE under HiWish program

== Defrosting ==
In the spring, various shapes appear because frost is disappearing from the surface, exposing the underling dark soil. Also, in some places dust is blown out of in geyser-like eruptions that are sometimes called "spiders." If a wind is blowing, the material creates a long, dark streak or fan.

During the winter, much frost accumulates. It freezes out directly onto the surface of the permanent polar cap, which is made of water ice covered with layers of dust and sand. The deposit begins as a layer of dusty CO_{2} frost. Over the winter, it recrystallizes and becomes denser. The dust and sand particles caught in the frost slowly sink. By the time temperatures rise in the spring, the frost layer has become a slab of semi-transparent ice about 3 feet thick, lying on a substrate of dark sand and dust. This dark material absorbs light and causes the ice to sublimate (turn directly into a gas). Eventually much gas accumulates and becomes pressurized. When it finds a weak spot, the gas escapes and blows out the dust. Speeds can reach 100 miles per hour. Dark channels can sometimes be seen; they are called "spiders." The surface appears covered with dark spots when this process is occurring.

Many ideas have been advanced to explain these features. These features can be seen in some of the pictures below.

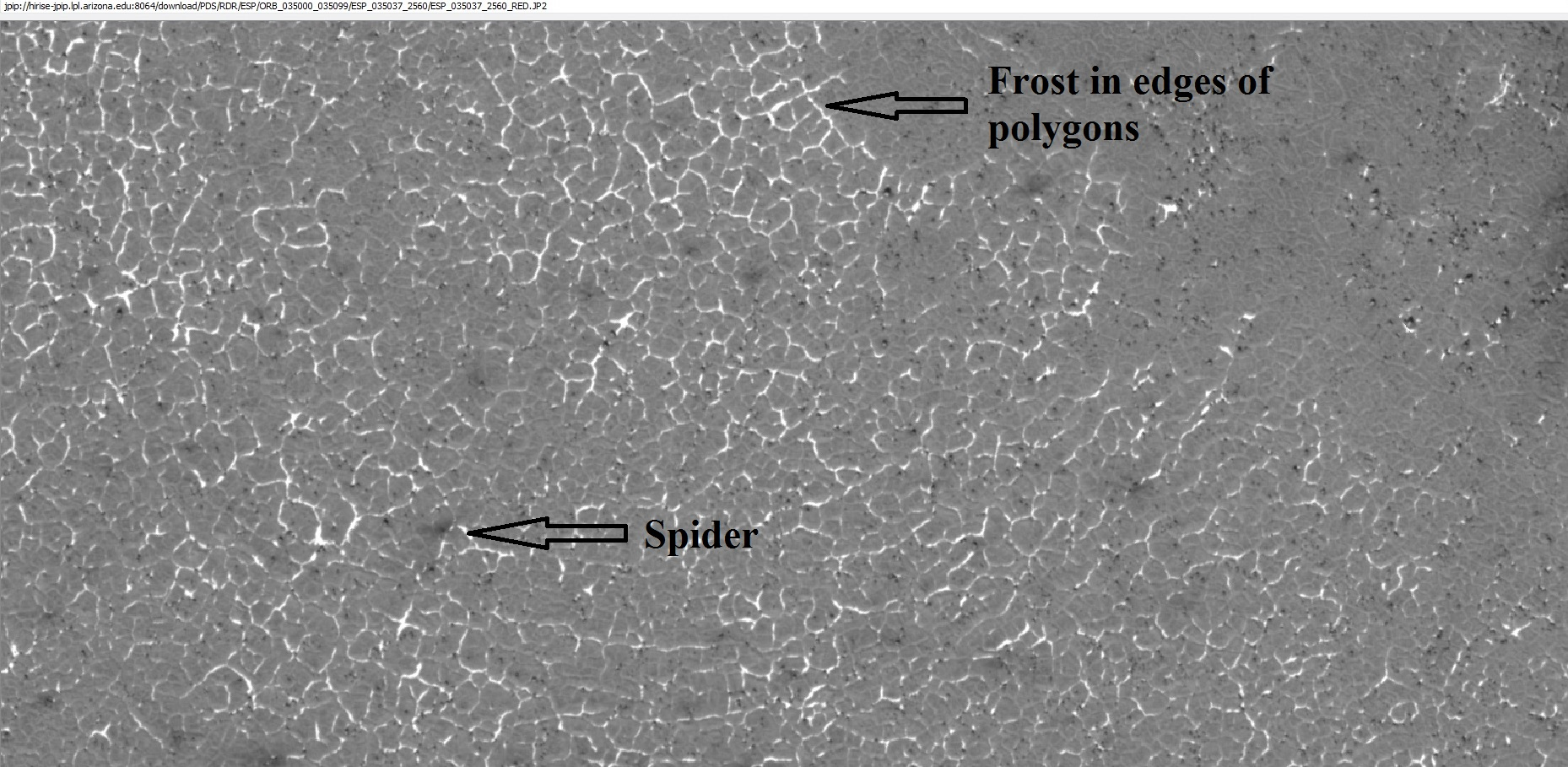
Spiders and frost in polygons during northern spring, as seen by HiRISE under HiWish program.

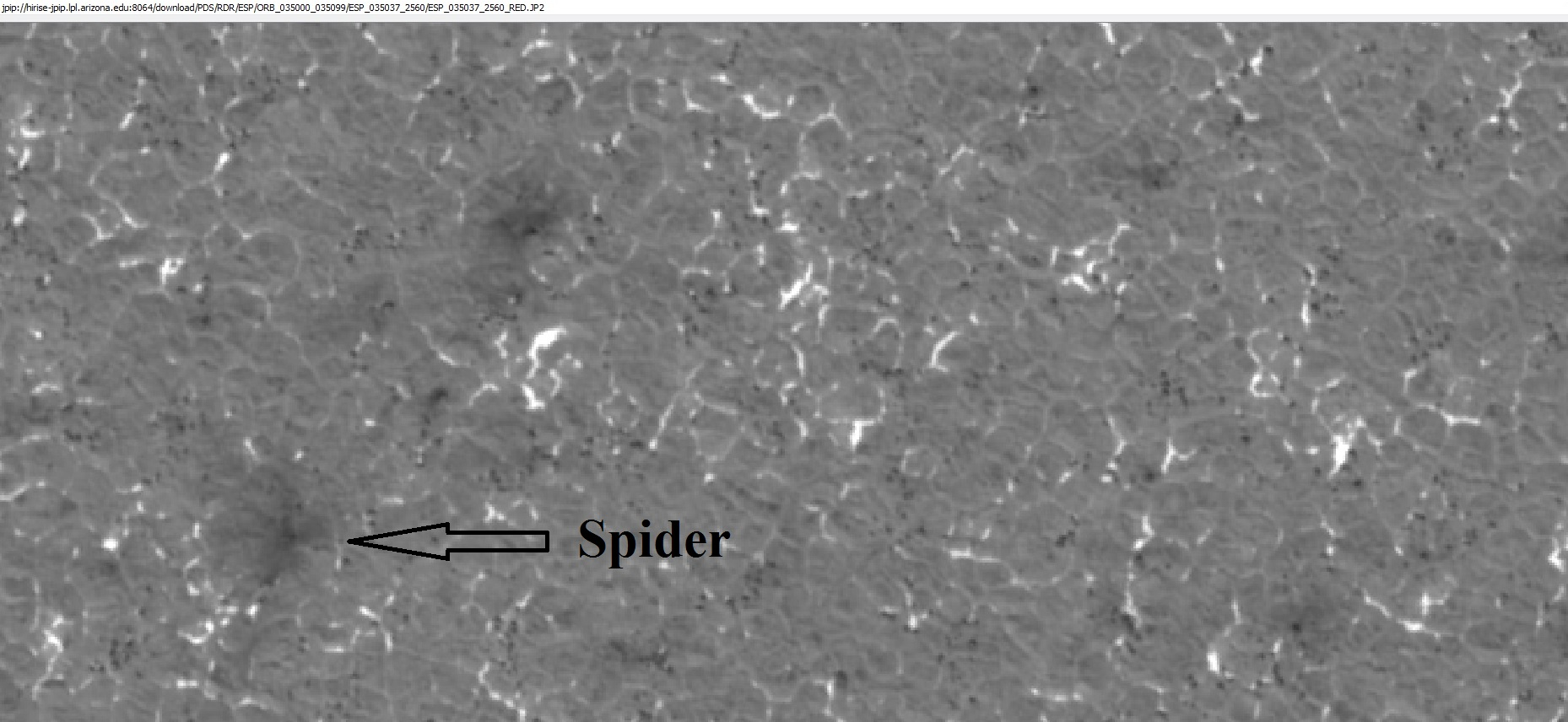
Close-up view of spider among polygons or patterned ground, as seen by HiRISE under HiWish program.

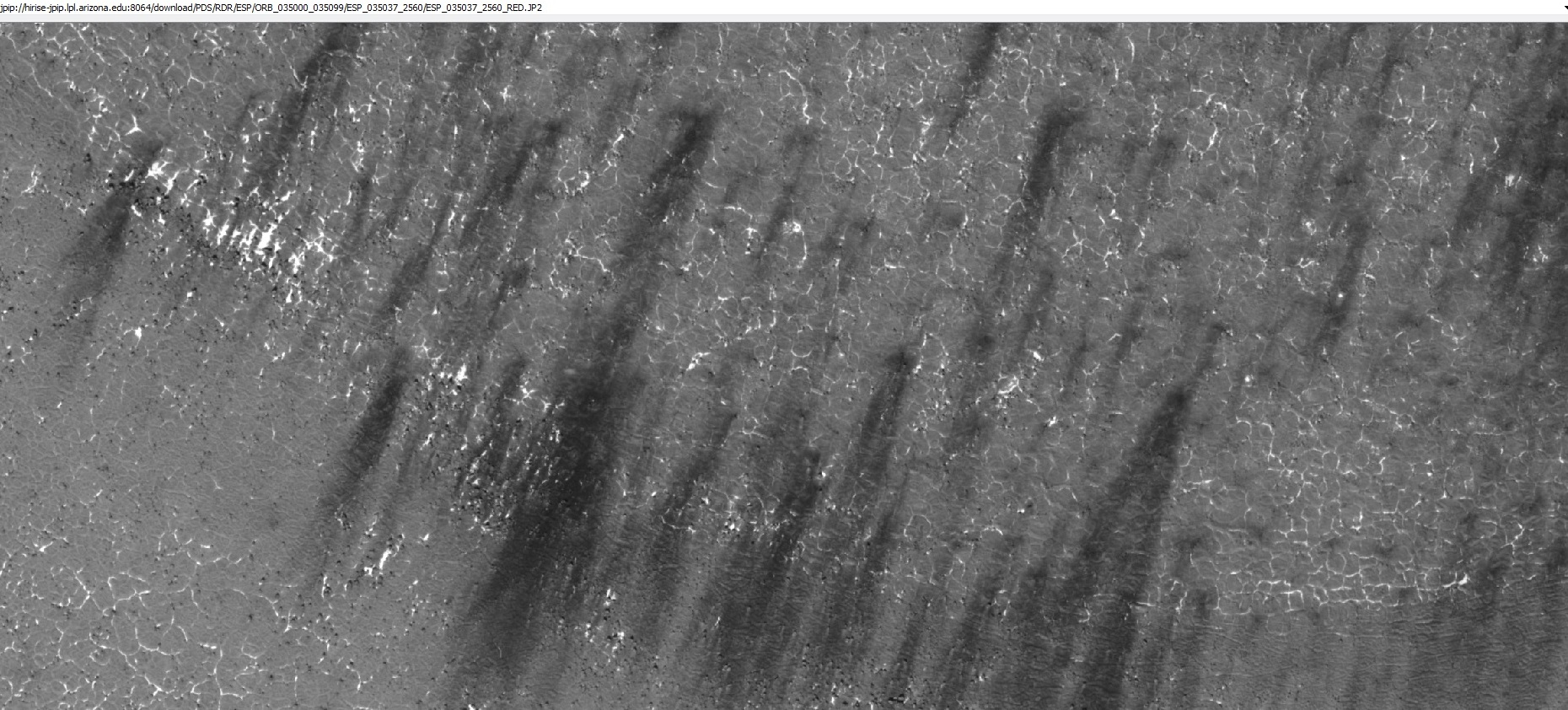
Spiders shaped by the wind into streak or fans, as seen by HiRISE under HiWish program. Polygon surface has frost in the troughs along the edges.

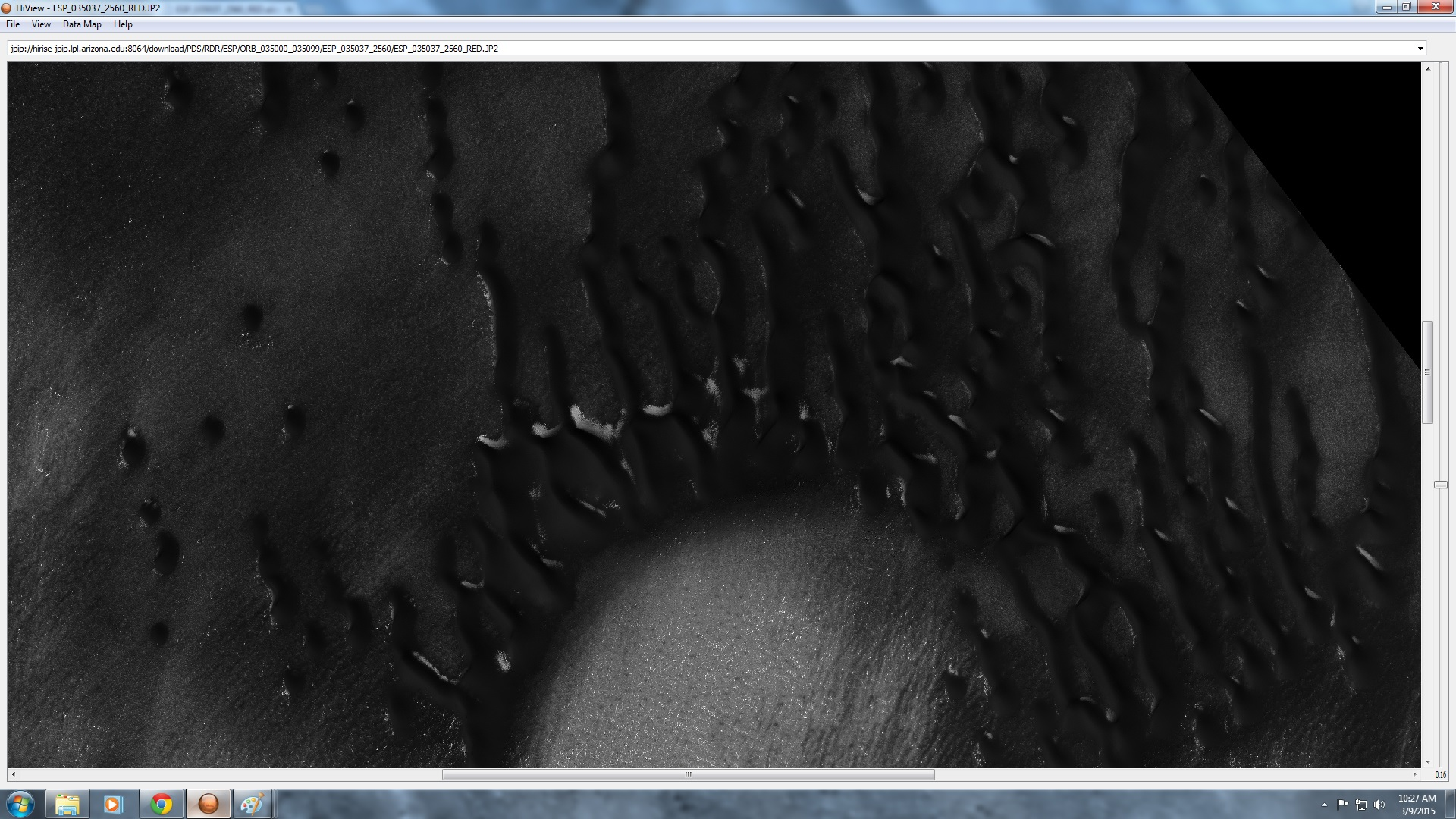
Group of dunes with most of the frost gone, as seen by HiRISE under HiWish program. Some ripples are visible.

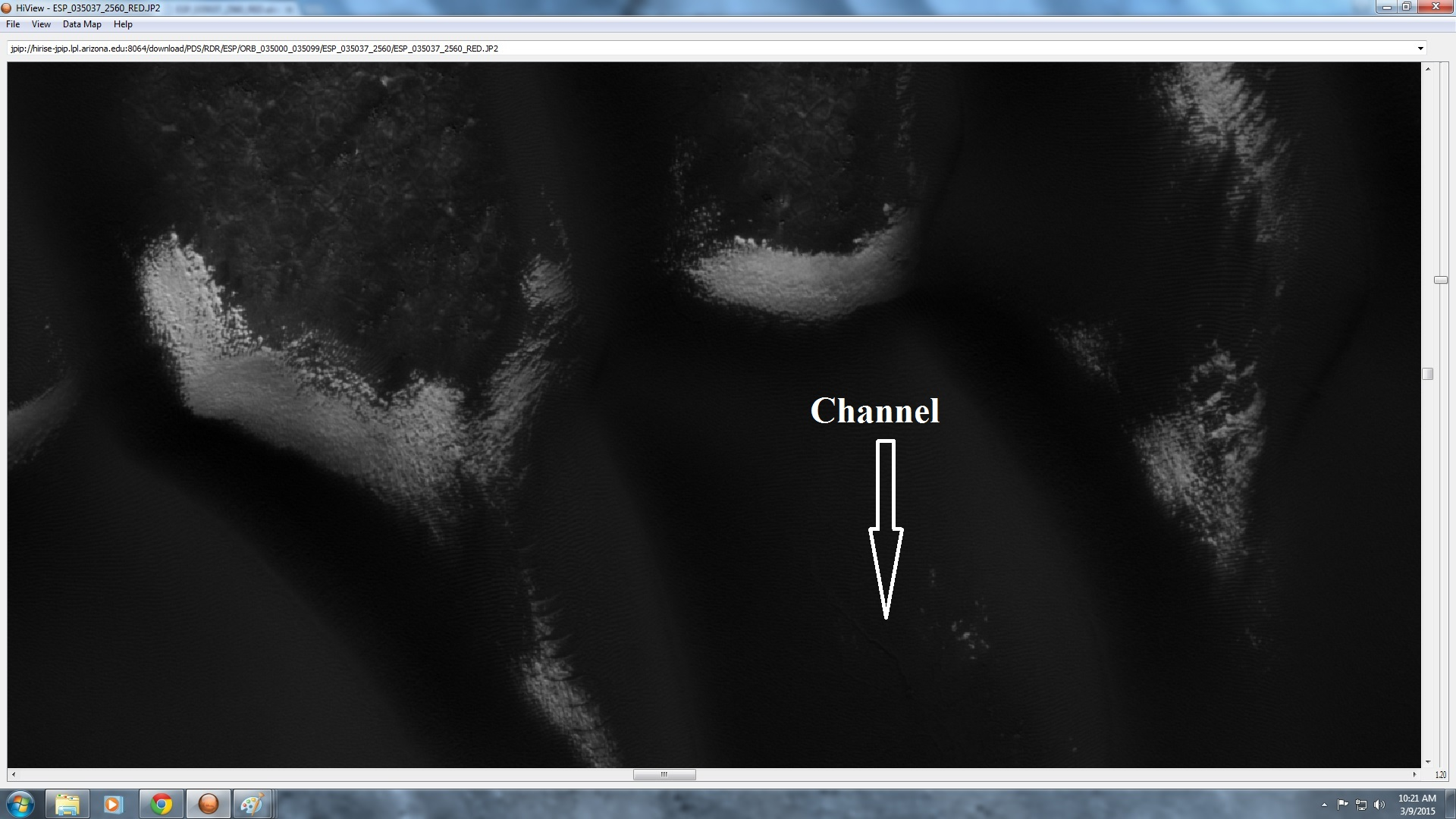
Close-up of defrosting dunes, as seen by HiRISE under HiWish program. Some ripples and a small channel are also visible.

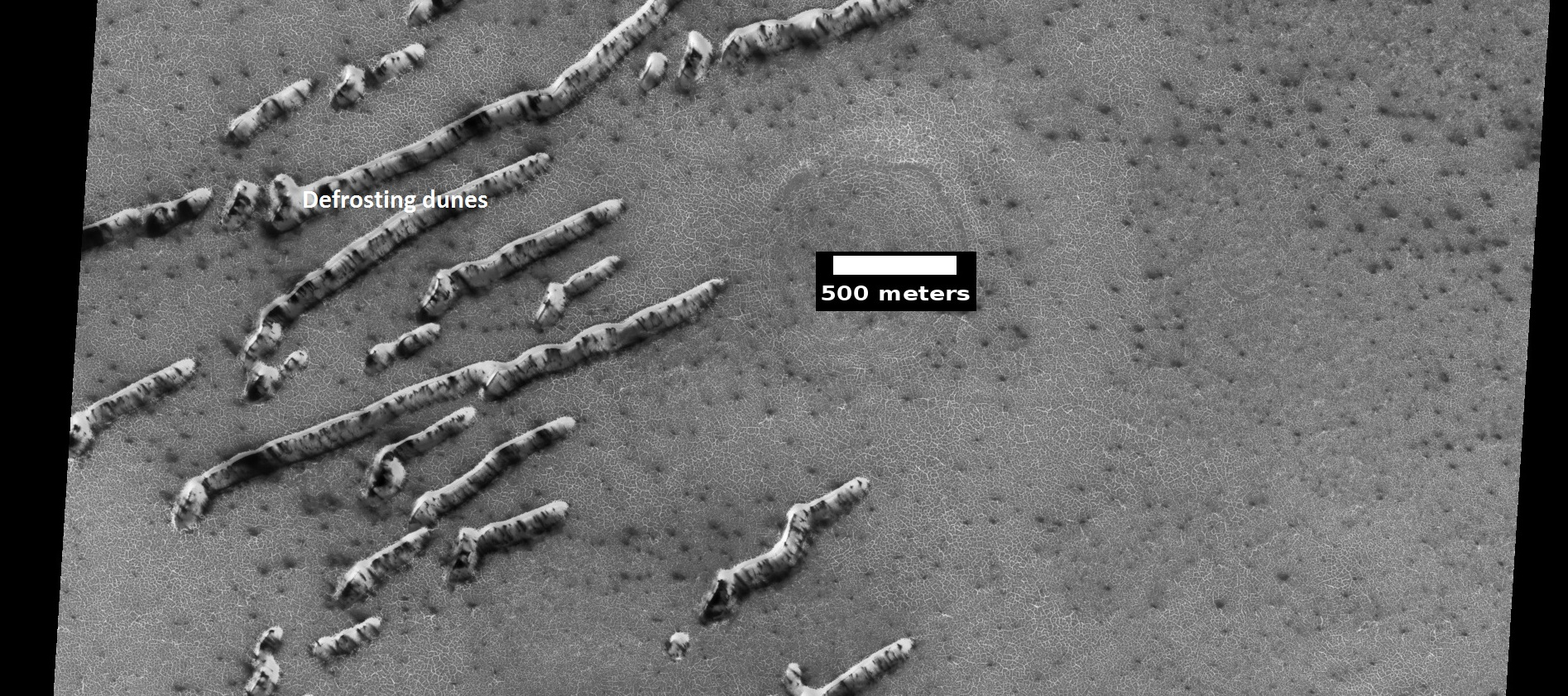
Defrosting dunes and ice in troughs of polygons, as seen by HiRISE under HiWish program

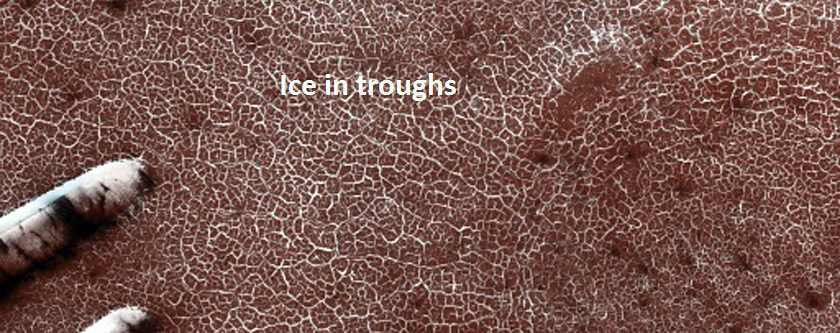
Color view of defrosting dunes and ice in troughs of polygons, as seen by HiRISE under HiWish program

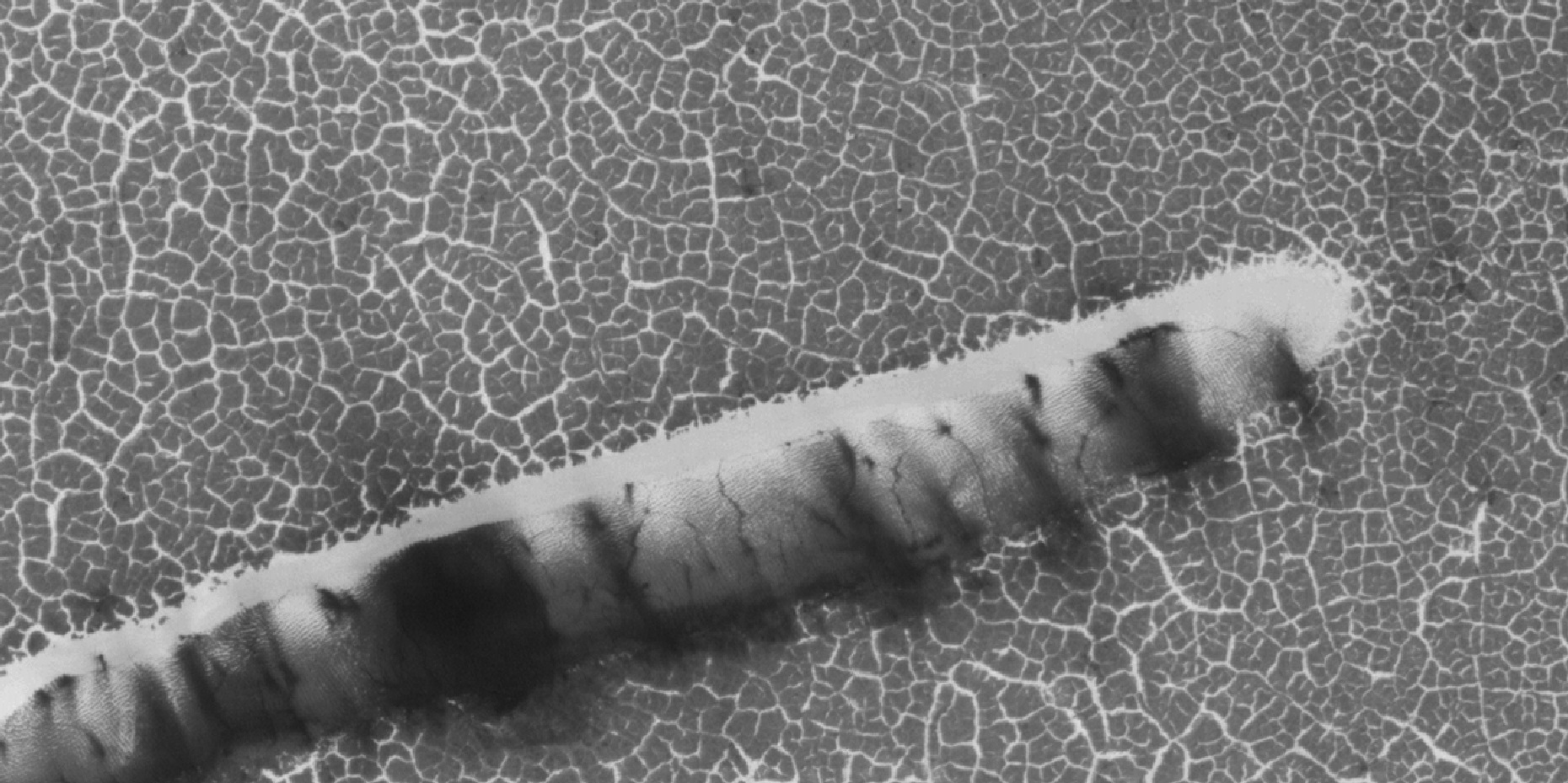
Defrosting surface, as seen by HiRISE under HiWish program Frost is disappearing in patches from a dune. The trough boundaries around the polygon shapes still contain frost; hence they are white. Note: the north side (side near top) has not defrosted because the sun is coming from the other side.
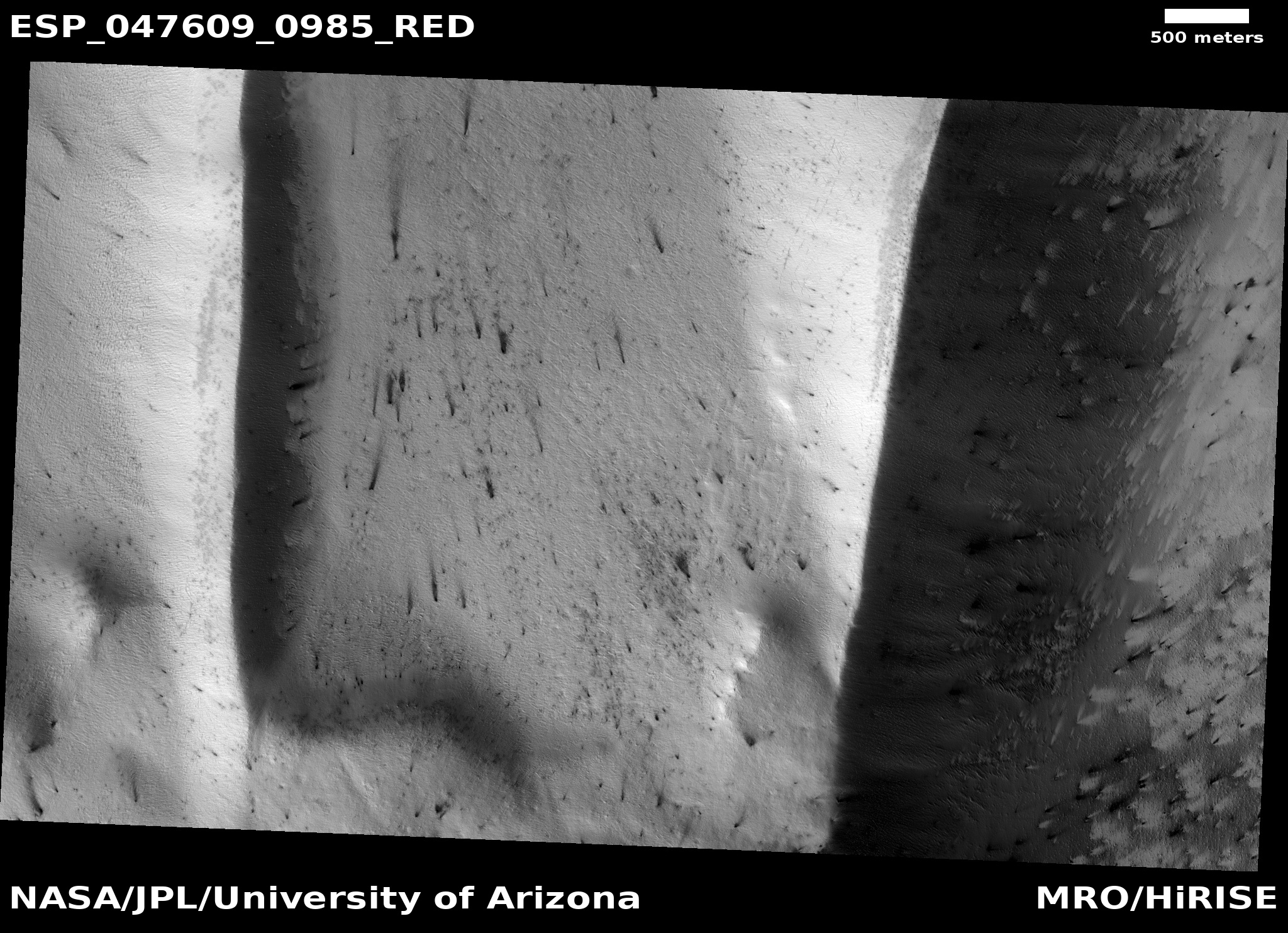
Wide view of plumes, as seen by HiRISE under HiWish program Many of the plumes show spiders when enlarged.

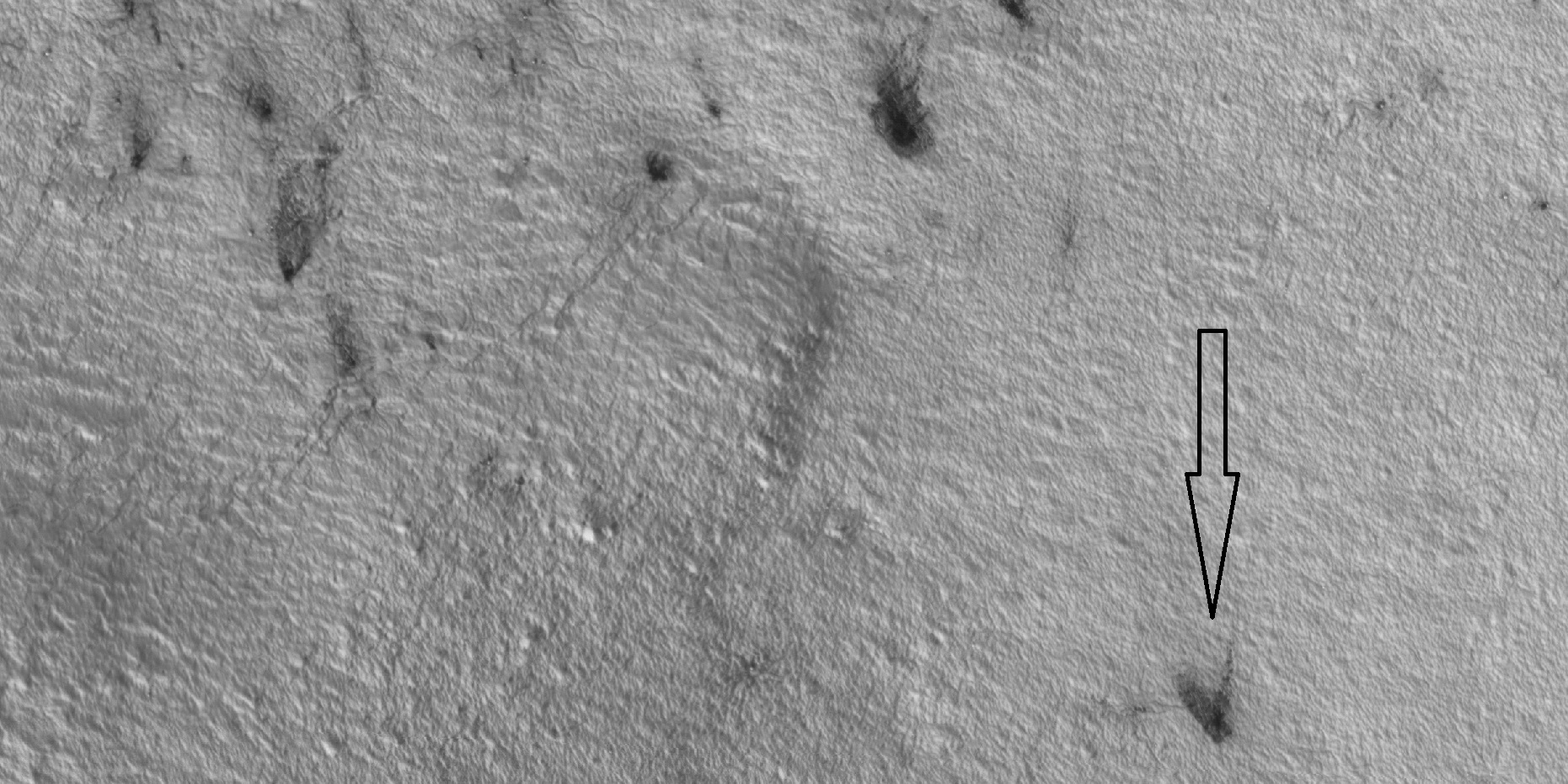
Plumes, as seen by HiRISE under HiWish program Arrow shows a double plume. This may have been because of shifting winds.

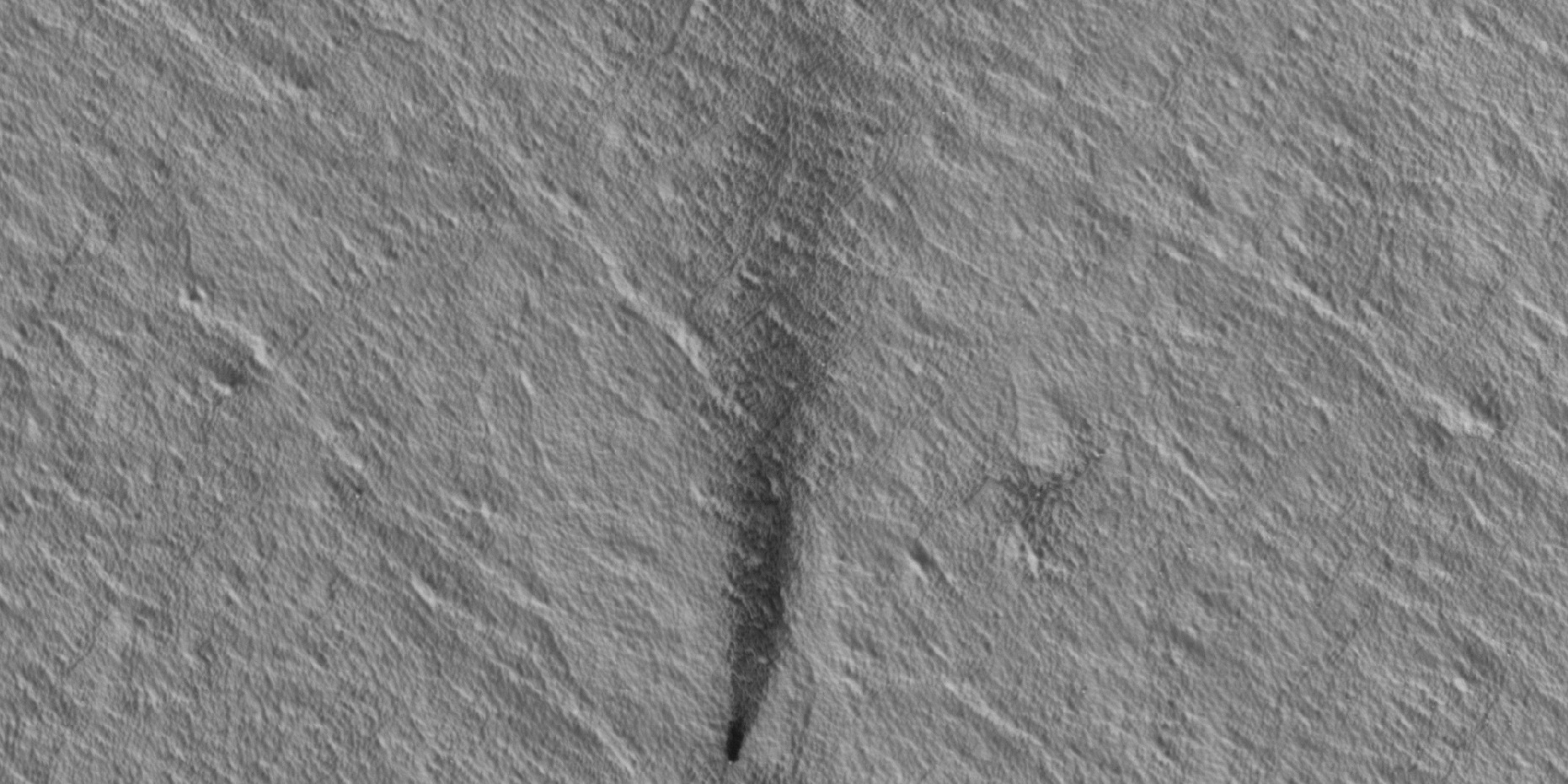
Long plume, as seen by HiRISE under HiWish program

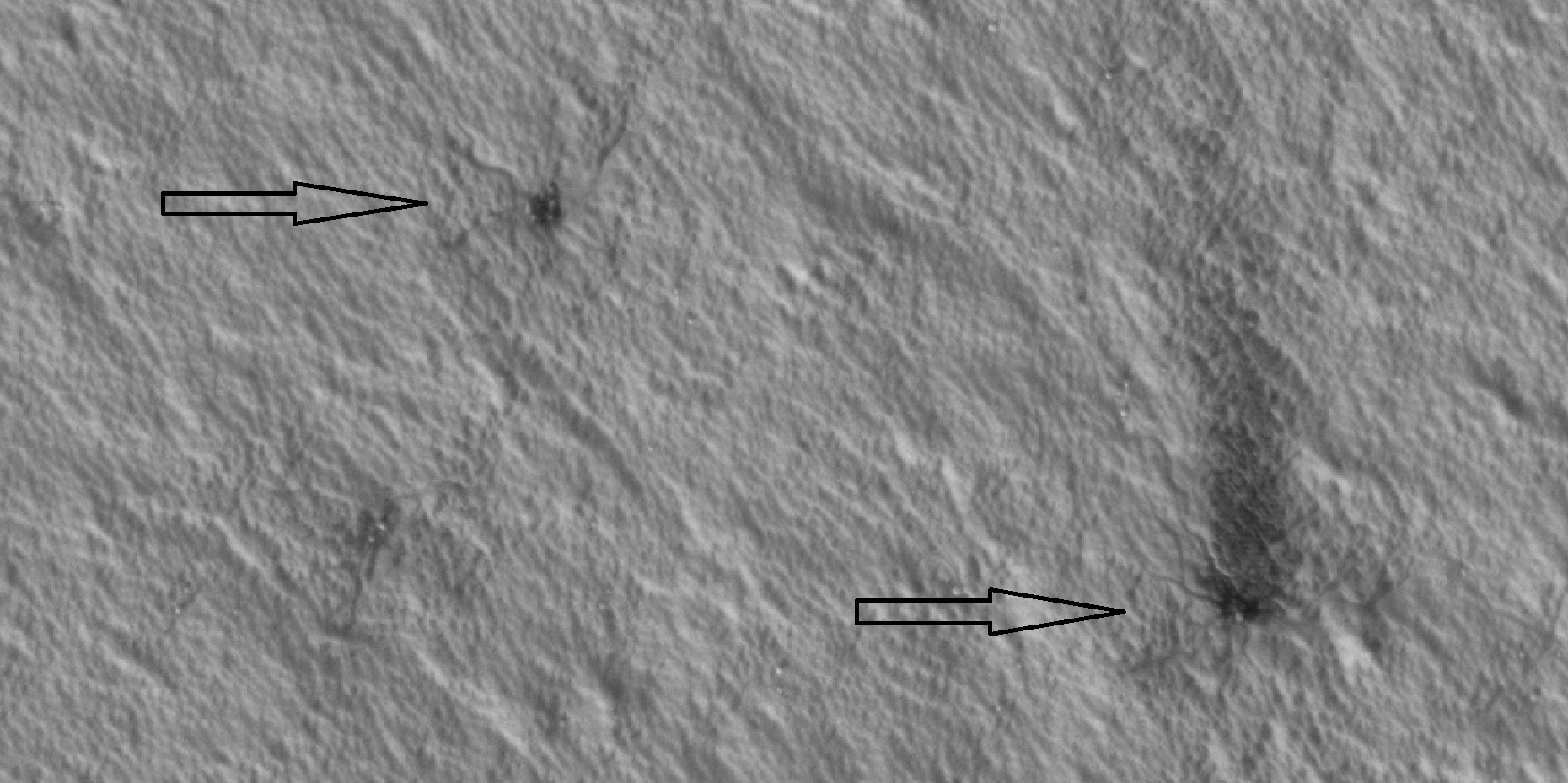
Spiders, as seen by HiRISE under HiWish program

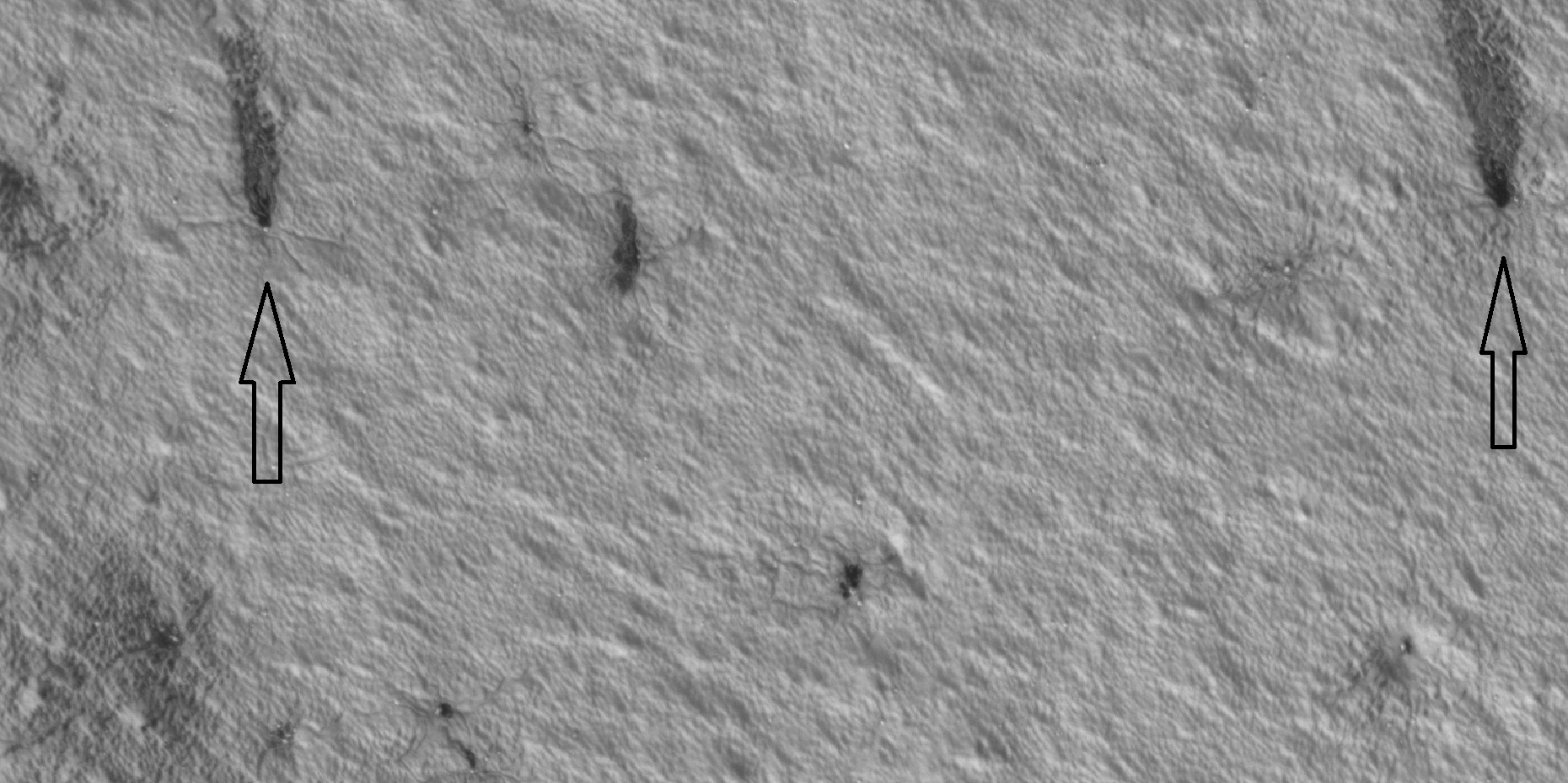
Plumes and spiders, as seen by HiRISE under HiWish program

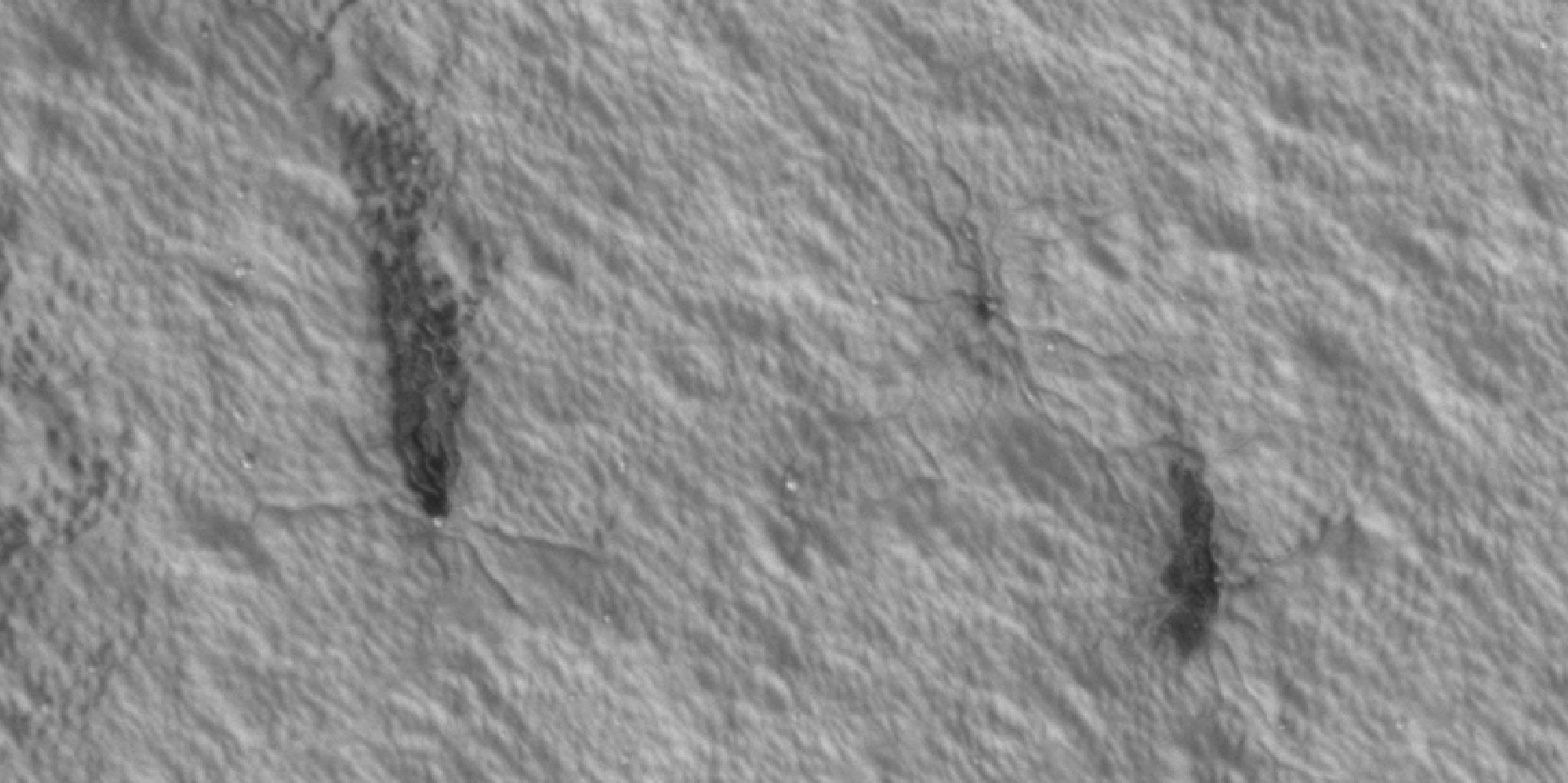
Plumes and spiders, as seen by HiRISE under HiWish program

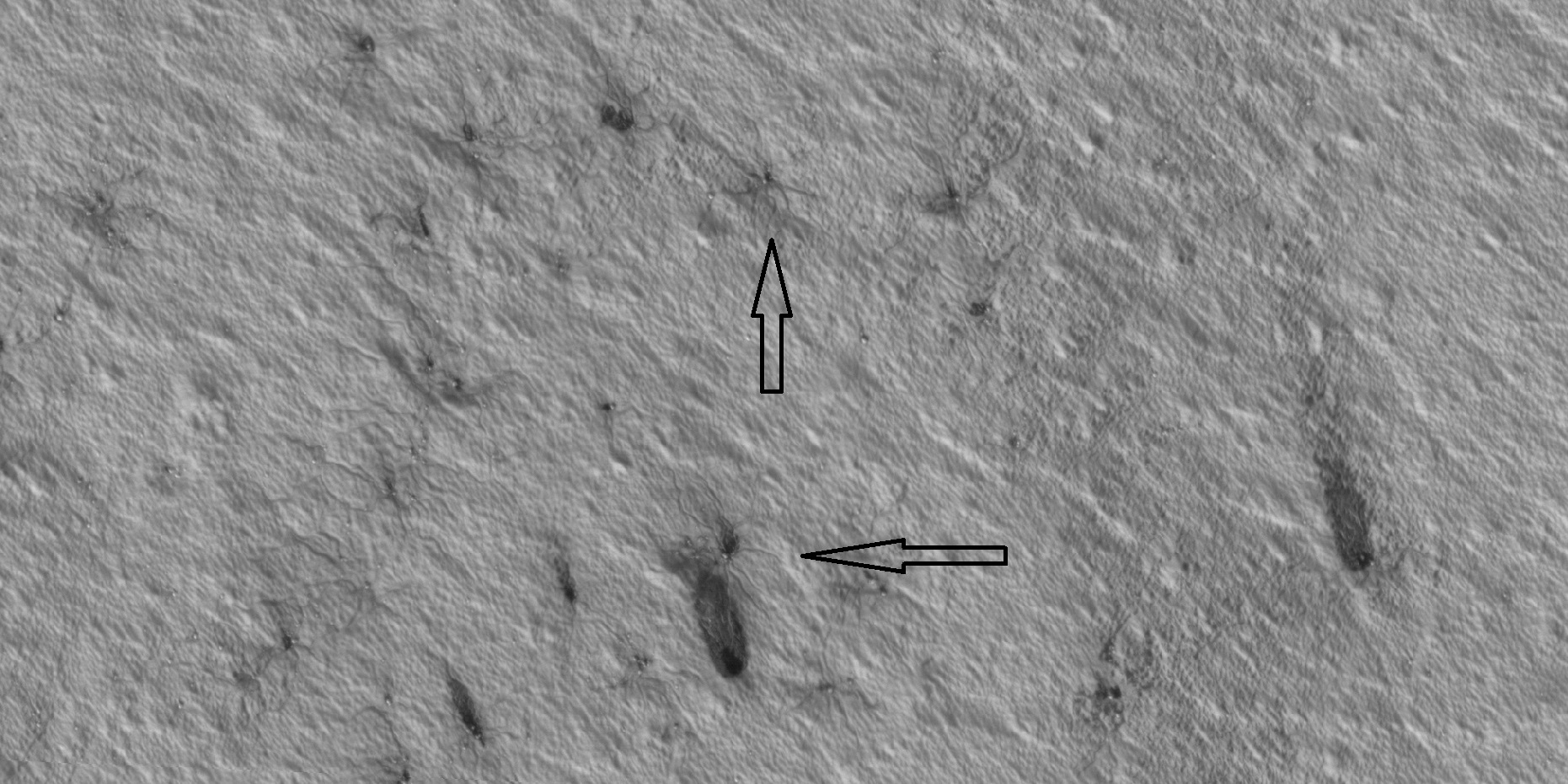
Plumes and spiders, as seen by HiRISE under HiWish program

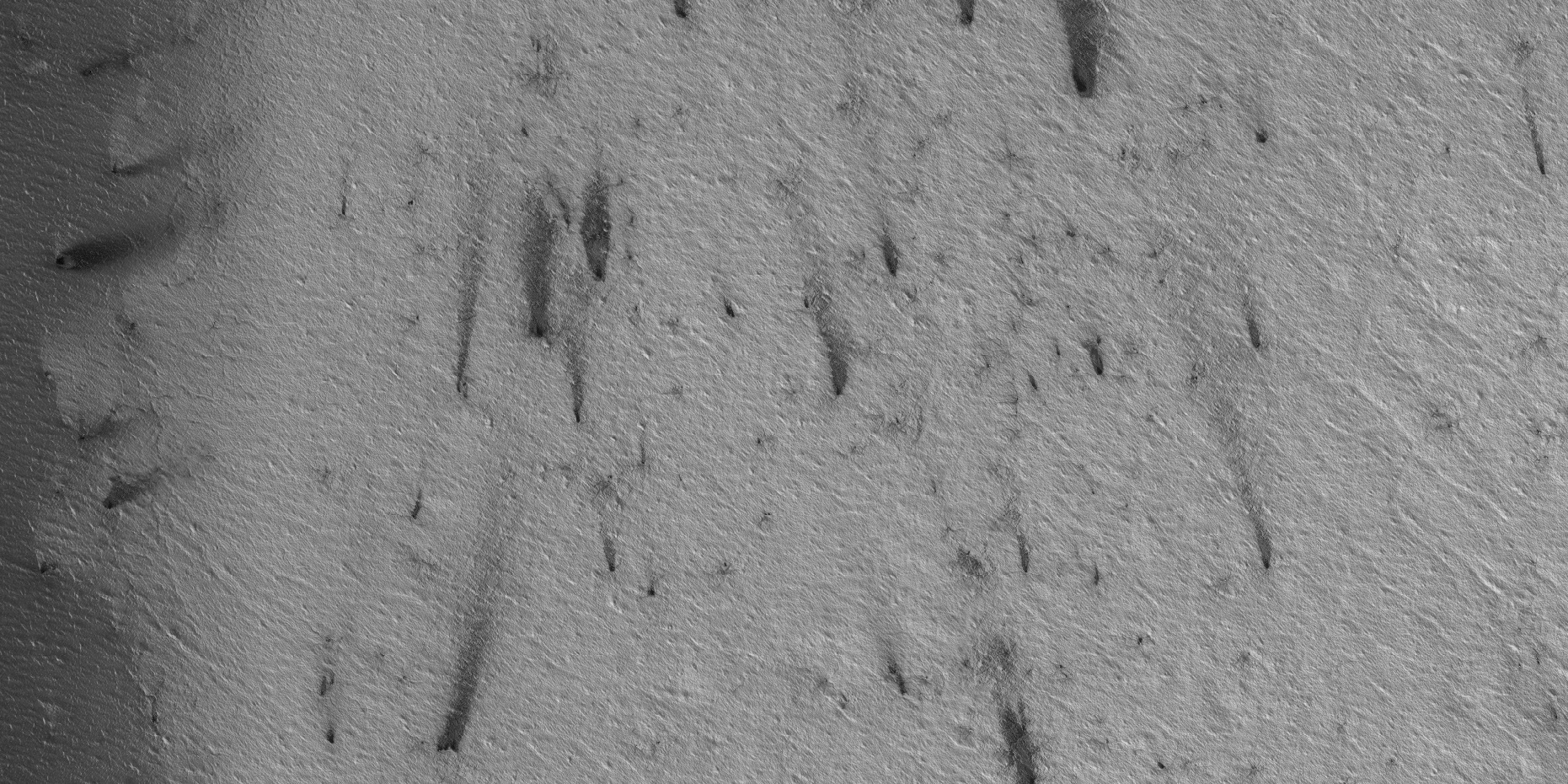
Wide view of plumes and spiders, as seen by HiRISE under HiWish program

== See also ==
- Barchan – Crescent-shaped dune
- Chaos terrain – Distinctive area of broken or jumbled terrain
- Climate of Mars
- Dark slope streak – Surface feature of Mars
- Dust devil tracks – Weather phenomenon on Mars
- Fretted terrain – Surface feature common to certain areas of Mars
- Geology of Mars – Geology of fourth planet from the Sun
- Geysers on Mars – Putative CO2 gas and dust eruptions on Mars
- Glacier – Persistent body of ice that moves downhill under its own weight
- Glaciers on Mars – Extraterrestrial bodies of ice
- Groundwater on Mars – Water held in permeable ground
- Ismenius Lacus quadrangle – Map of Mars
- Lineated valley fill – Martian geologic feature
- List of areas of chaos terrain on Mars
- Martian chaos terrain – Irregular groups of large blocks of rock
- Martian gullies – Incised networks of narrow channels and sediments on Mars
- Seasonal flows on warm Martian slopes – Surface features on Mars—recurrent slope lineae
- Scalloped topography – Depressions in topography at mid-latitudes of Mars
- Water on Mars – Study of past and present water on Mars
- Yardangs on Mars – Aeolian formation

== Recommended reading ==
- Lorenz, R. 2014. The Dune Whisperers. The Planetary Report: 34, 1, 8–14
- Lorenz, R., J. Zimbelman. 2014. Dune Worlds: How Windblown Sand Shapes Planetary Landscapes. Springer Praxis Books / Geophysical Sciences.
- Grotzinger, J. and R. Milliken (eds.). 2012. Sedimentary Geology of Mars. SEPM.
