= Glaciers on Mars =

Extraterrestrial bodies of ice

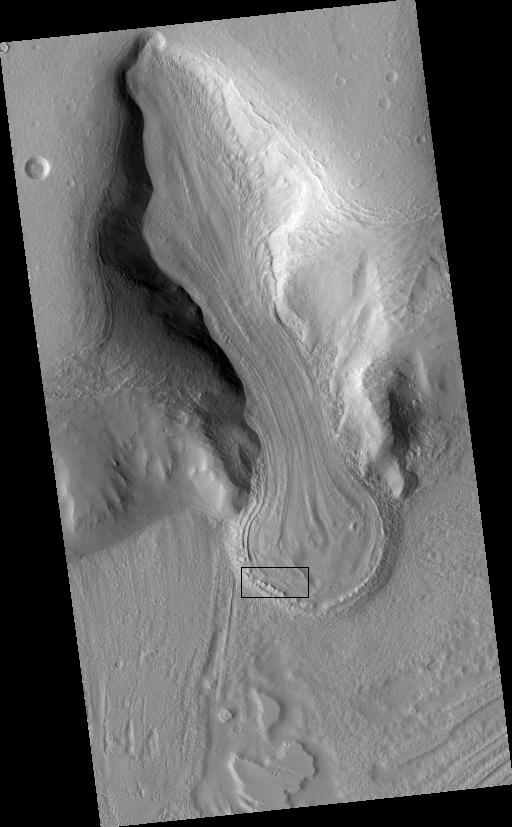
Martian glacier as seen by HiRISE. Glacier is moving down valley, then spreading out on plain. Evidence for flow comes from the many lines on surface. The rimming ridges at the end of the glacier are probably moraines Location is in Protonilus Mensae in Ismenius Lacus quadrangle.

Glaciers, loosely defined as patches of currently or recently flowing ice, are thought to be present across large but restricted areas of the modern Martian surface, and are inferred to have been more widely distributed at times in the past. Lobate convex features on the surface known as viscous flow features and lobate debris aprons, which show the characteristics of non-Newtonian flow, are now almost unanimously regarded as true glaciers.

However, a variety of other features on the surface have also been interpreted as directly linked to flowing ice, such as fretted terrain, lineated valley fill, concentric crater fill, and arcuate ridges. A variety of surface textures seen in imagery of the midlatitudes and polar regions are also thought to be linked to sublimation of glacial ice. Lobate debris aprons (LDA's) and lineated valley fill (LVF) may be almost the same—being mostly ice with a covering of debris, but their shapes are dependent on their locations. When confined within a valley, LVF is present; in contrast when not confined, this flowing debris covered ice forms LDA's.

Today, features interpreted as glaciers are largely restricted to latitudes polewards of around 30° latitude. Particular concentrations are found in the Ismenius Lacus quadrangle. Based on current models of the Martian atmosphere, ice should not be stable if exposed at the surface in the mid-Martian latitudes. It is thus thought that most glaciers must be covered with a layer of rubble or dust preventing free transfer of water vapor from the subliming ice into the air. This also suggests that in the recent geological past, the climate of Mars must have been different in order to allow the glaciers to grow stably at these latitudes. This provides good independent evidence that the obliquity of Mars has changed significantly in the past, as independently indicated by modelling of the orbit of Mars. Evidence for past glaciation also appears on the peaks of several Martian volcanoes in the tropics.

Like glaciers on Earth, glaciers on Mars are not pure water ice. Many are thought to contain substantial proportions of debris, and a substantial number are probably better described as rock glaciers. For many years, largely because of the modeled instability of water ice in the midlatitudes where the putative glacial features were concentrated, it was argued that almost all glaciers were rock glaciers on Mars. However, recent direct observations made by the SHARAD radar instrument on the Mars Reconnaissance Orbiter satellite have confirmed that at least some features are relatively pure ice, and thus, true glaciers. Indeed, more analysis of SHARAD data led researchers to state that martian glaciers are 80% pure ice.

Some authors have also made claims that glaciers of solid carbon dioxide have formed on Mars under certain rare conditions.

Some landscapes look just like glaciers moving out of mountain valleys on Earth. Some appear to have a hollowed out center, looking like a glacier after almost all the ice has disappeared. What is left are the moraines—the dirt and debris carried by the glacier. These supposed alpine glaciers have been called glacier-like forms (GLF) or glacier-like flows (GLF). Glacier-like forms are a later and maybe more accurate term because we cannot be sure the structure is currently moving. Another, more general term sometimes seen in the literature is viscous flow features (VFF).

== Radar studies ==
Radar studies with the SHAllow RADar (SHARAD) on the Mars Reconnaissance Orbiter showed that lobate debris aprons (LDA) and lineated valley fill (LVF) contain pure water ice covered with a thin layer of rocks that insulated the ice. Ice was found both in the southern hemisphere and in the northern hemisphere. Researchers at the Niels Bohr Institute combined radar observations with ice flow modelling to say that ice in all of the Martian glaciers is equivalent to what could cover the entire surface of Mars with 1.1 meters of ice. The fact that the ice is still there suggests that a thick layer of dust is protecting the ice; the current atmospheric conditions on Mars are such that any exposed water ice would sublimate.

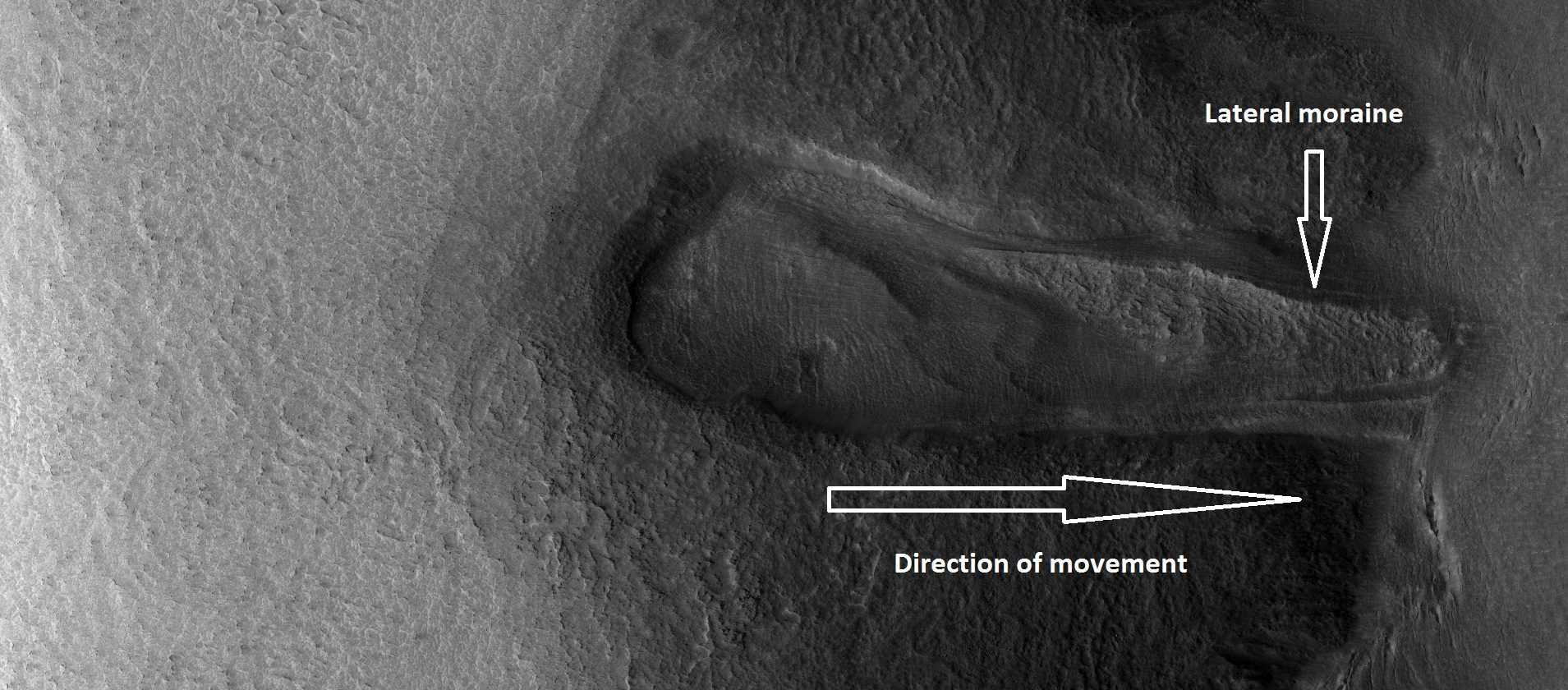
Martian glacier moving down a valley, as seen by HiRISE under HiWish program.

== Climate changes ==
It is thought that ice accumulated when Mars's orbital tilt was very different from the present (the axis the planet spins on has considerable "wobble," meaning its angle changes over time). A few million years ago, the tilt of the axis of Mars was 45 degrees instead of its present 25 degrees. Its tilt, also called obliquity, varies greatly because its two tiny moons cannot stabilize it like the Moon stabilizes Earth.

Many features on Mars, especially in the Ismenius Lacus quadrangle, are believed to contain large amounts of ice. The most popular model for the origin of the ice is climate change from large changes in the tilt of the planet's rotational axis. At times the tilt has even been greater than 80 degrees Large changes in the tilt explains many ice-rich features on Mars.

Studies have shown that when the tilt of Mars reaches 45 degrees from its current 25 degrees, ice is no longer stable at the poles. Furthermore, at this high tilt, stores of solid carbon dioxide (dry ice) sublimate, thereby increasing the atmospheric pressure. This increased pressure allows more dust to be held in the atmosphere. Moisture in the atmosphere will fall as snow or as ice frozen onto dust grains. Calculations suggest this material will concentrate in the mid-latitudes. General circulation models of the Martian atmosphere predict accumulations of ice-rich dust in the same areas where ice-rich features are found. When the tilt begins to return to lower values, the ice sublimates (turns directly to a gas) and leaves behind a lag of dust. The lag deposit caps the underlying material so with each cycle of high tilt levels, some ice-rich mantle remains behind. The smooth surface mantle layer probably represents only relative recent material.

== Geomorphology ==
=== Concentric crater fill, lineated valley fill, and lobate debris aprons ===
Several types of landforms have been identified as probably dirt and rock debris covering huge deposits of ice. Concentric crater fill (CCF) contains dozens to hundreds of concentric ridges that are caused by the movements of sometimes hundreds of meter thick accumulations of ice in craters. Lineated valley fill (LVF)are lines of ridges in valleys. These lines may have developed as other glaciers moved down valleys. Some of these glaciers seem to come from material sitting around mesas and buttes. Lobate debris aprons (LDA) is the name given to these glaciers. All of these features that are believed to contain large amounts of ice are found in the mid-latitudes in both the Northern and Southern hemispheres. These areas are sometimes called Fretted terrain because it is sometimes winkled. With the superior resolution of cameras on Mars Global Surveyor (MGS) and MRO, we have found the surface of LDAs, LVF, and CCFs have a complex tangle of ridges that resemble the surface of the human brain. Wide ridges are called closed-cell brain terrain, and the less common narrow ridges are called open-cell brain terrain. It is thought that the wide closed-cell terrain still contains a core of ice, that when it eventually disappears the center of the wide ridge collapses to produce the narrow ridges of the open-cell brain terrain. Today it is widely accepted that glacier-like forms, lobate debris aprons, lineated valley fill, and concentric fill are all related in that they have the same surface texture. Glacier-like forms in valleys and cirque-like alcoves may coalesce with others to produce lobate debris aprons. When opposing lobate debris aprons converge, linear valley fill results

Many of these features are found in the Northern hemisphere in parts of a boundary called the Martian dichotomy. The Martian dichotomy is mostly found between 0 and 70 E longitudes. Near this area are regions that are named from ancient names: Deuteronilus Mensae, Protonilus Mensae, and Nilosyrtis Mensae.

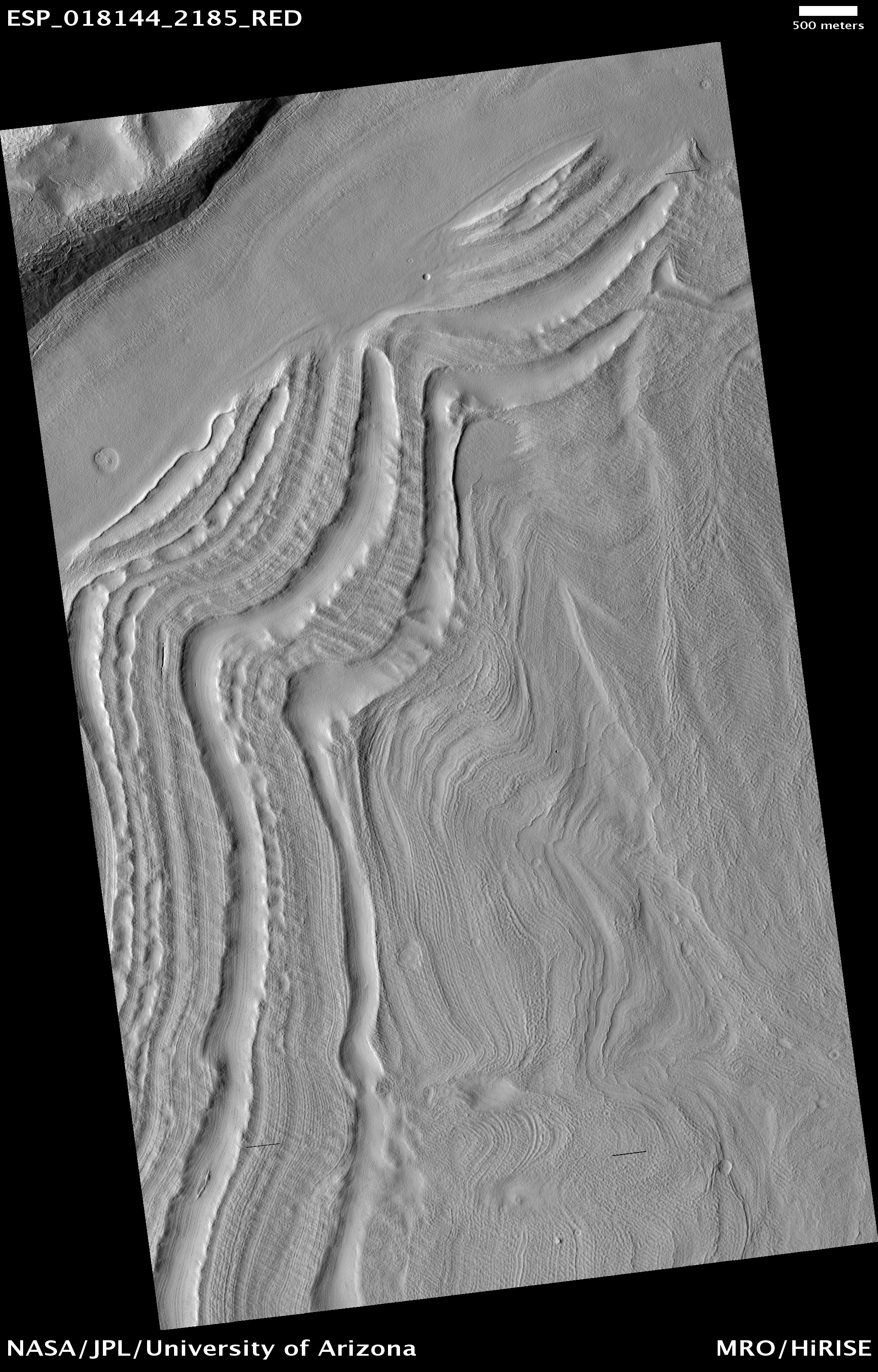
Well-developed hollows, as seen by HiRISE under the HiWish program. Hollows are on floor of a crater with concentric crater fill. Location is Casius quadrangle.

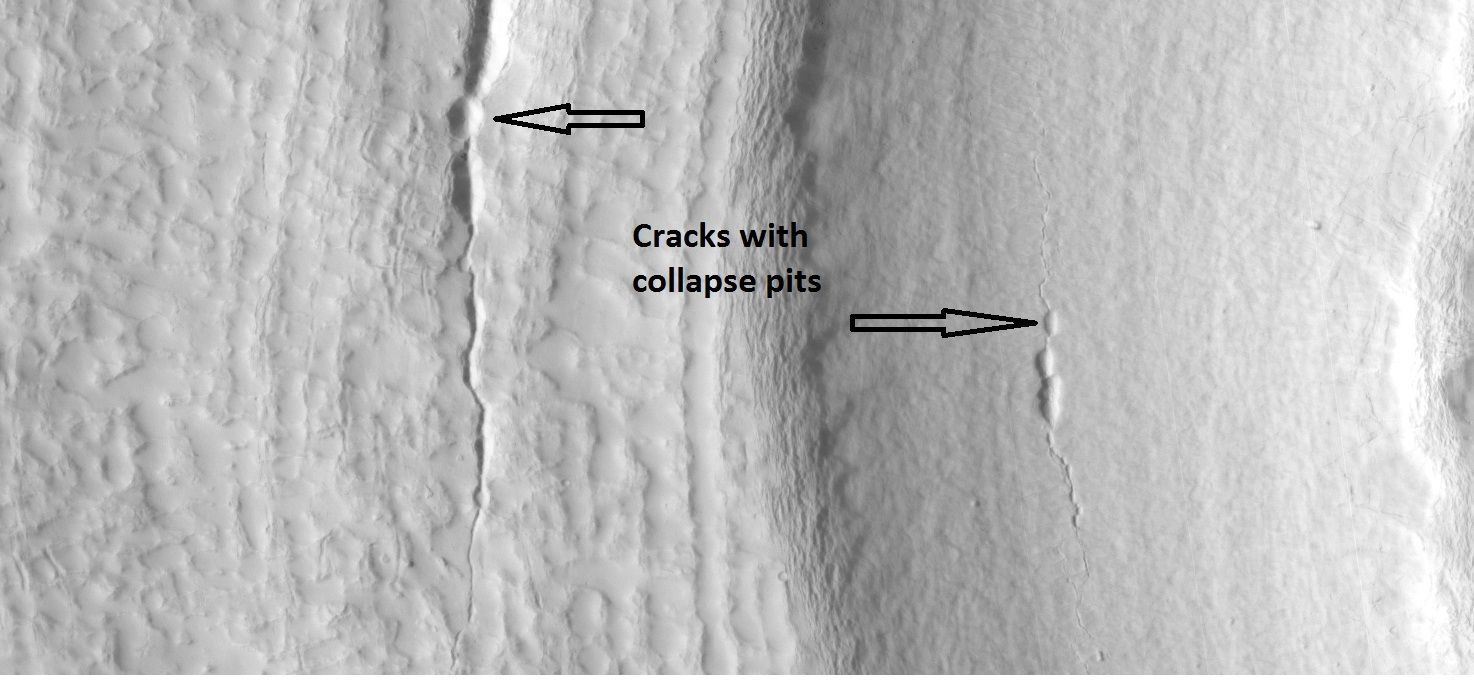
Close-up that shows cracks containing pits on the floor of a crater containing concentric crater fill, as seen by HiRISE under HiWish program. Location is Casius quadrangle.

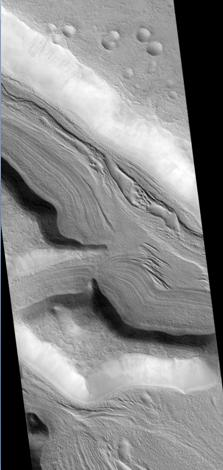
Clanis and Hypsas Valles, as seen by HiRISE. Ridges are probably due to glacial flow. Ice is covered by a thin layer of rocks. Location is Ismenius Lacus quadrangle.

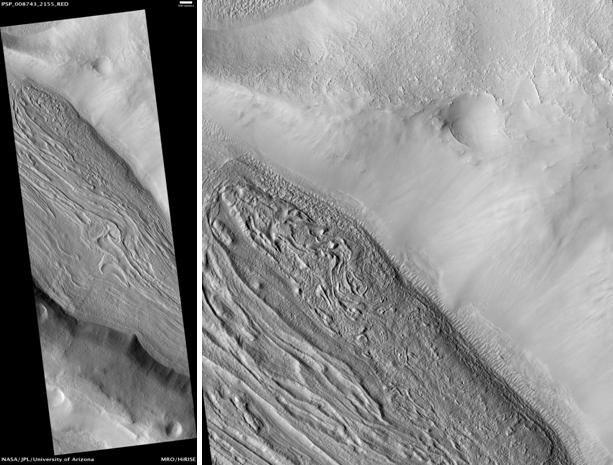
Coloe Fossae Lineated valley fill, as seen by HiRISE. Scale bar is 500 meters long. Location is Ismenius Lacus quadrangle.

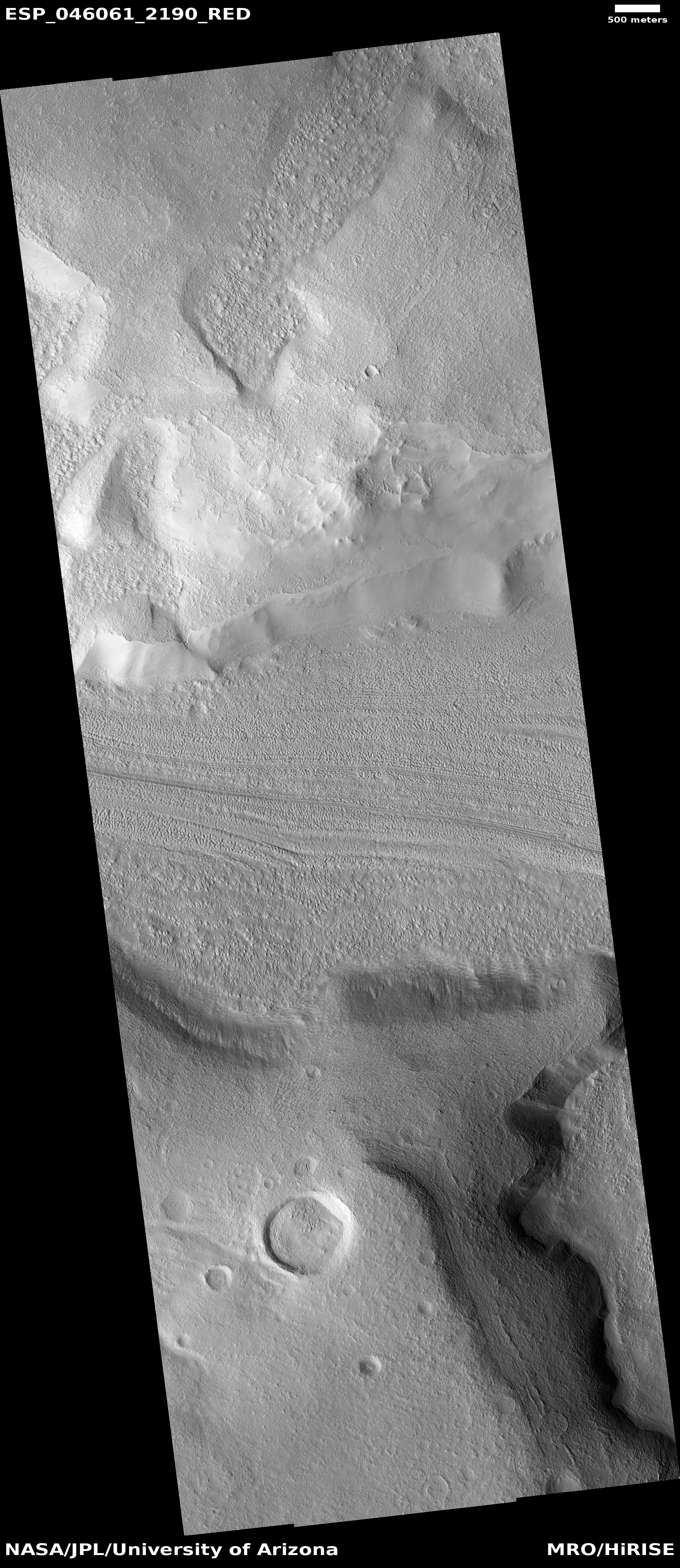
Lineated valley fill in Ismenius Lacus quadrangle, as seen by HiRISE under HiWish program.

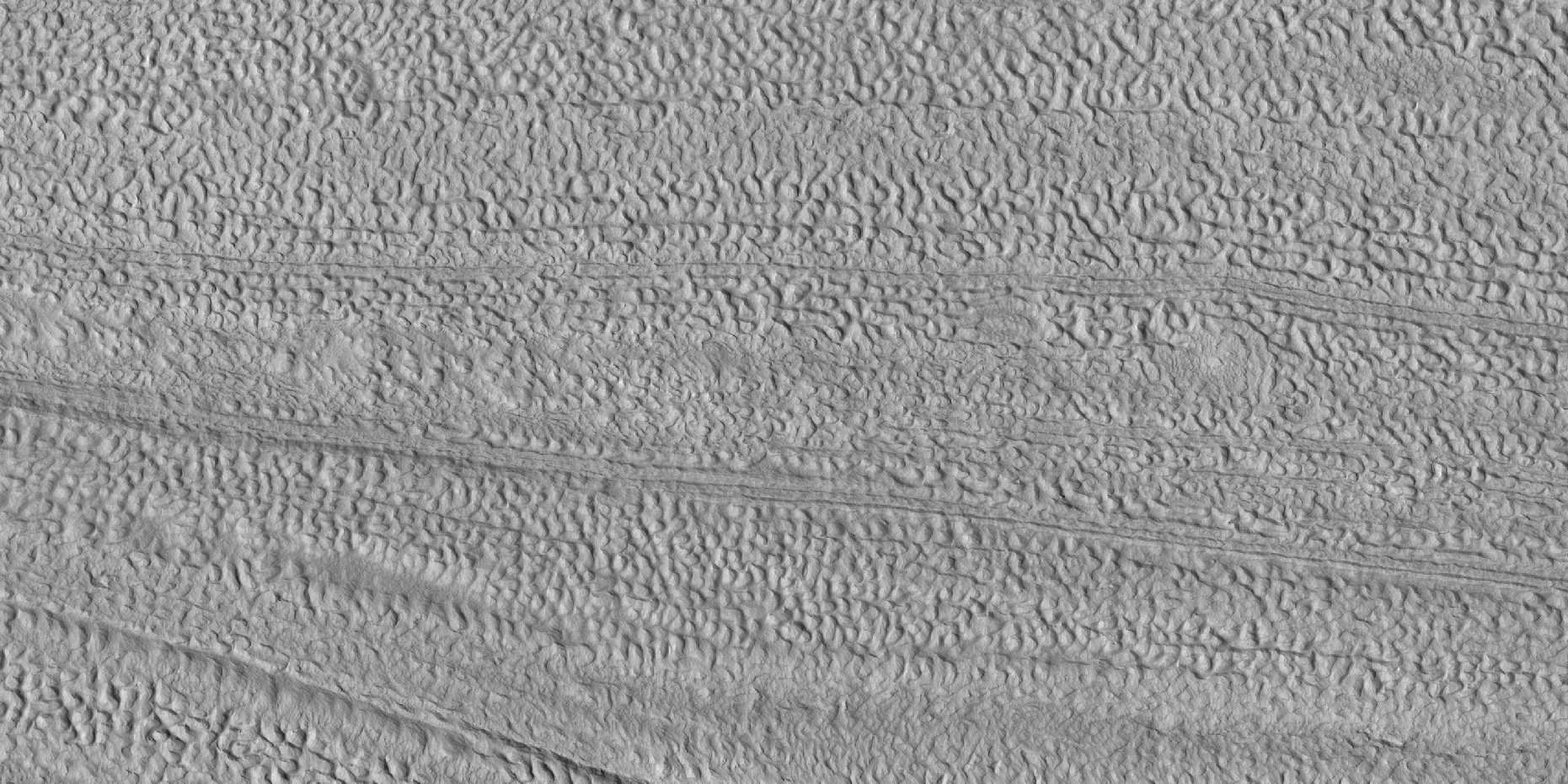
Close view of Lineated valley fill in Ismenius Lacus quadrangle, as seen by HiRISE under HiWish program

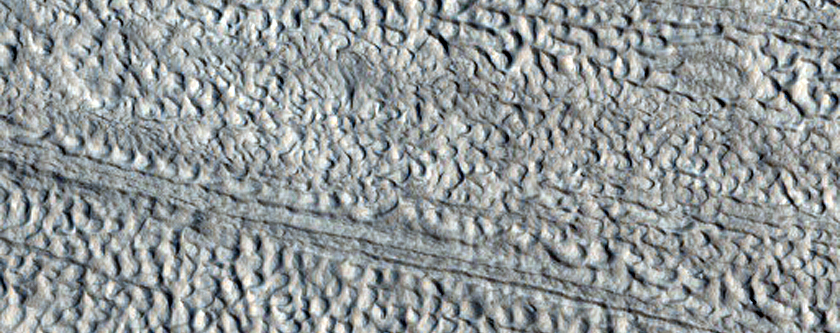
Close, color view of Lineated valley fill in Ismenius Lacus quadrangle, as seen by HiRISE under HiWish program

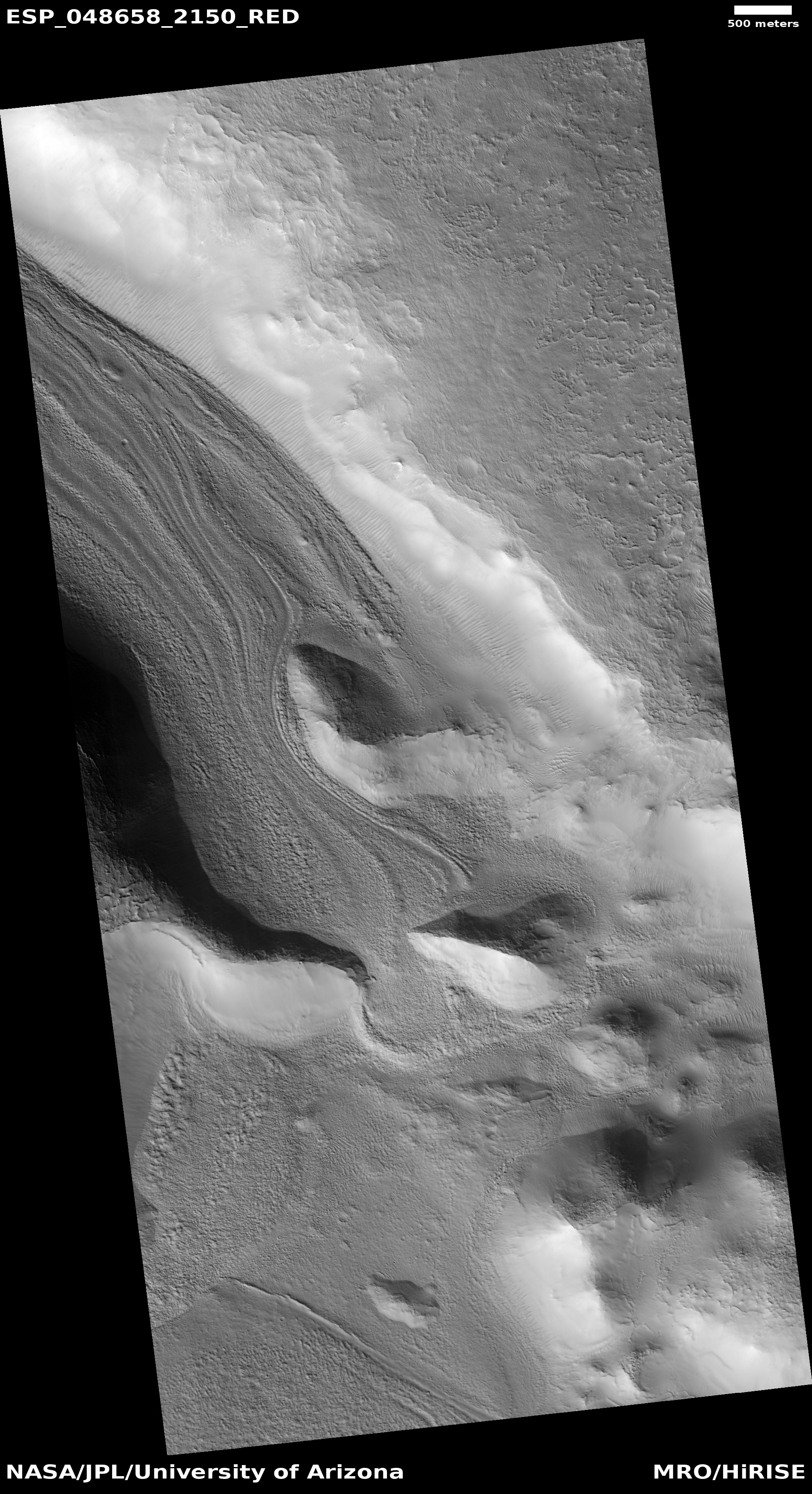
Valley showing Lineated valley fill, as seen by HiRISE under HiWish program Linear valley flow is caused by ice movements. Location is Casius quadrangle.

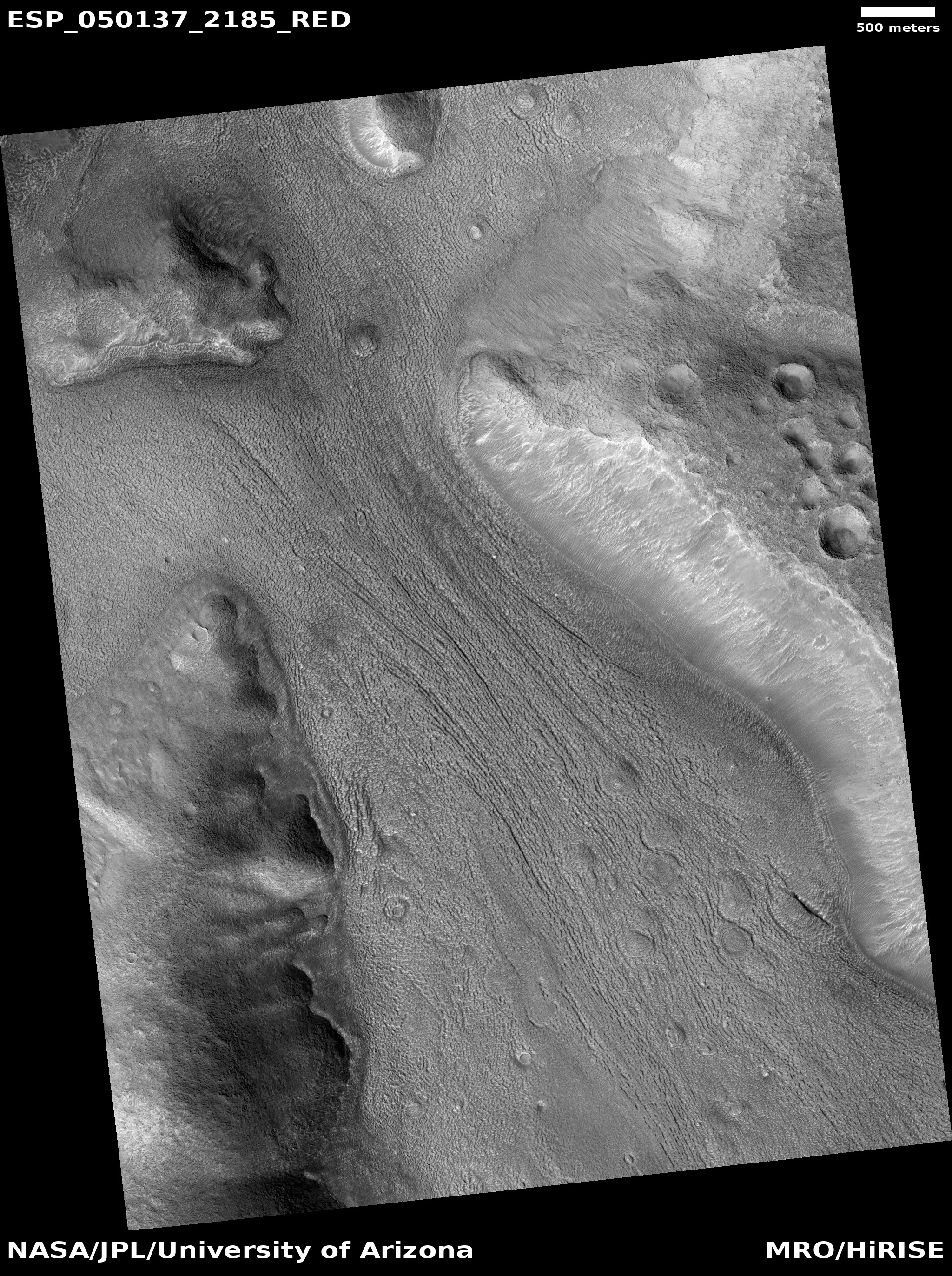
Lineated valley fill in valley, as seen by HiRISE under HiWish program Linear valley flow is ice covered by debris. Location is Ismenius Lacus quadrangle.

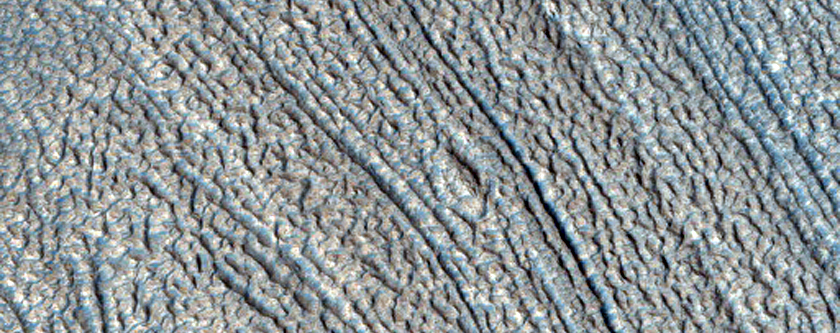
Close, color view of lineated valley fill, as seen by HiRISE under HiWish program

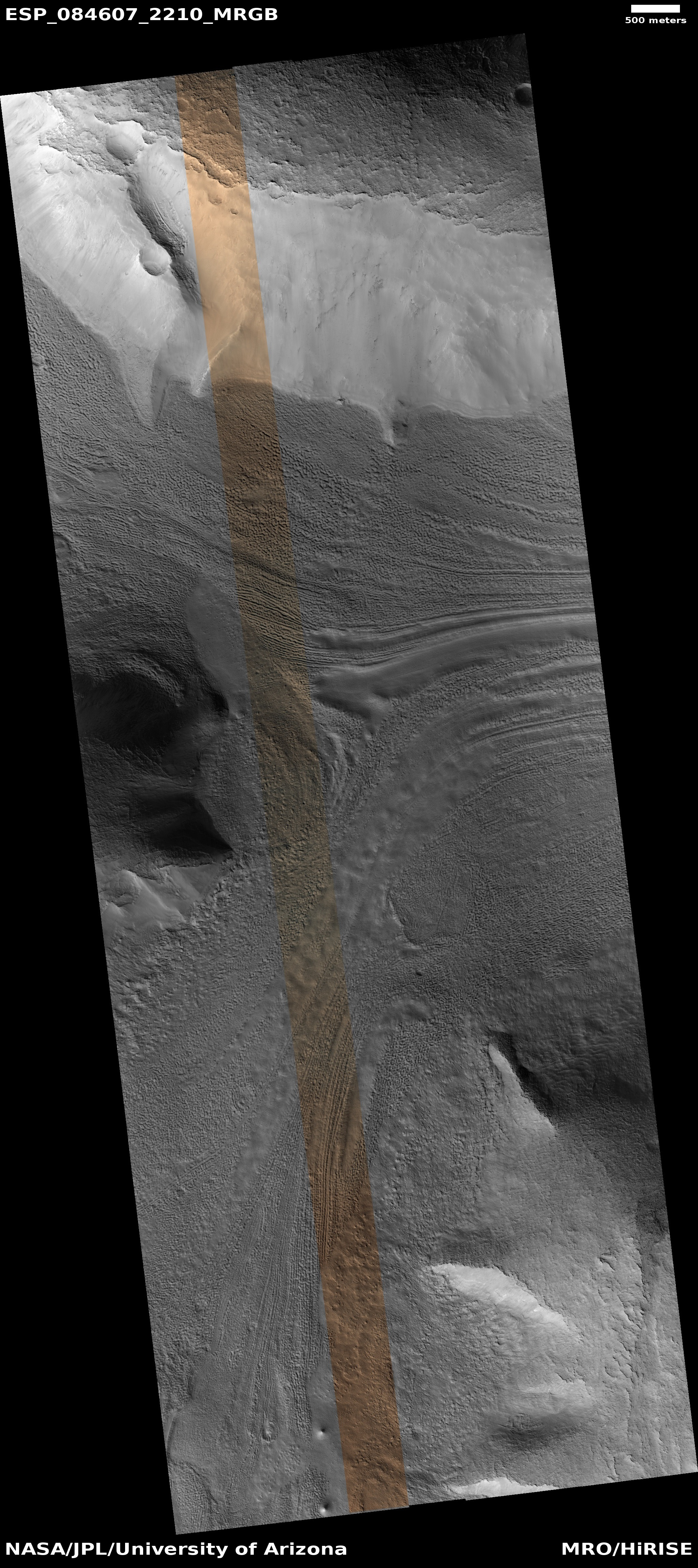
Lineated valley fill in valley, as seen by HiRISE under HiWish program. Linear valley flow is ice covered by debris.

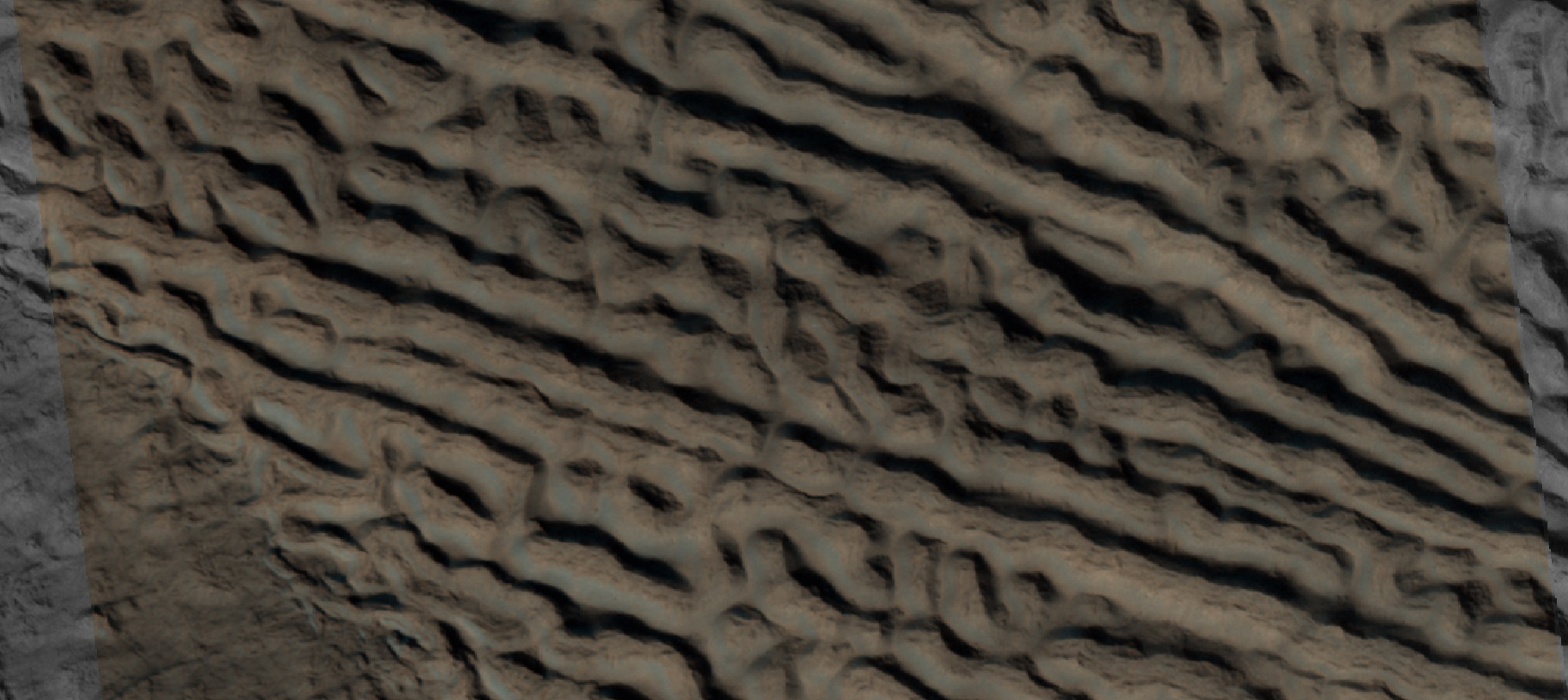
Close view of lineated valley fill (LVF) in valley, as seen by HiRISE under HiWish program. Linear valley flow is ice covered by debris. Picture is about 1 km wide.

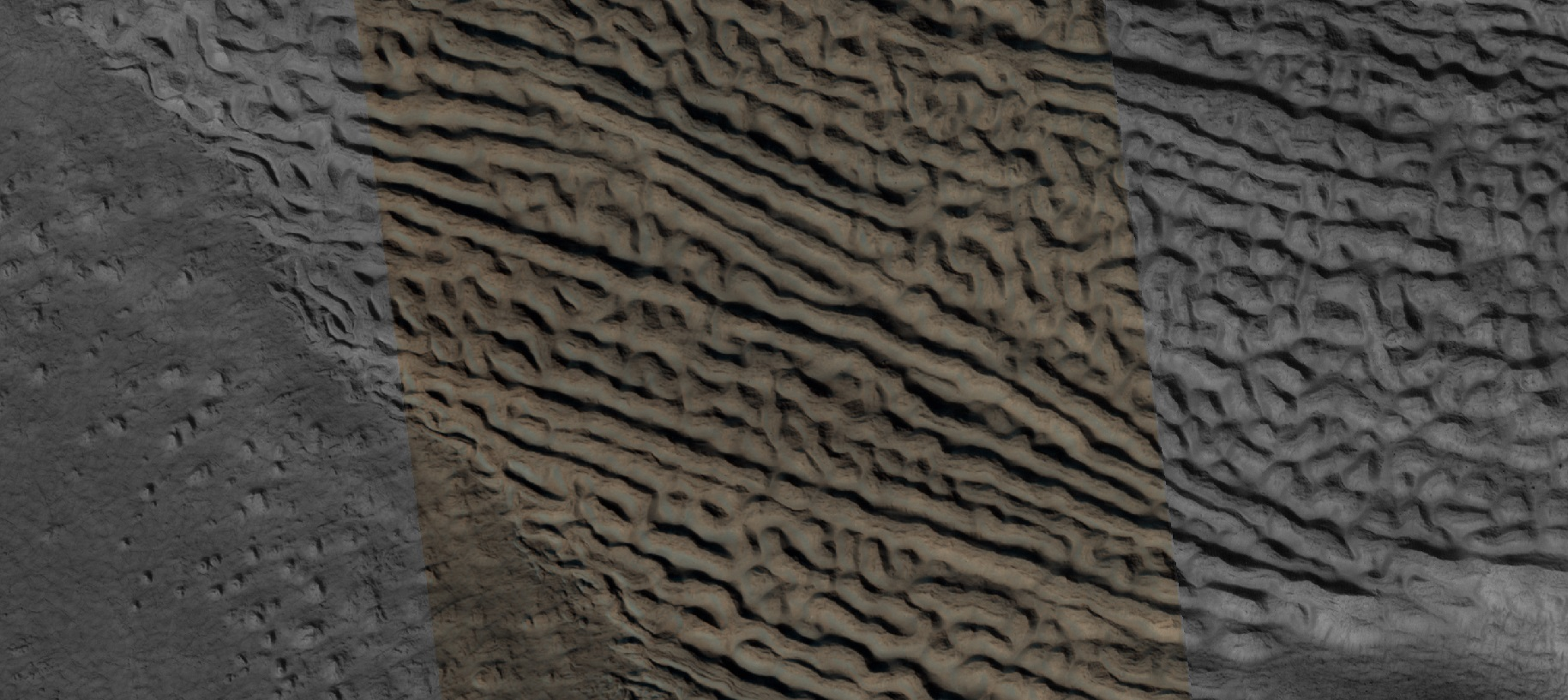
Close view of lineated valley fill (LVF) in valley, as seen by HiRISE under HiWish program. Linear valley flow is ice covered by debris.

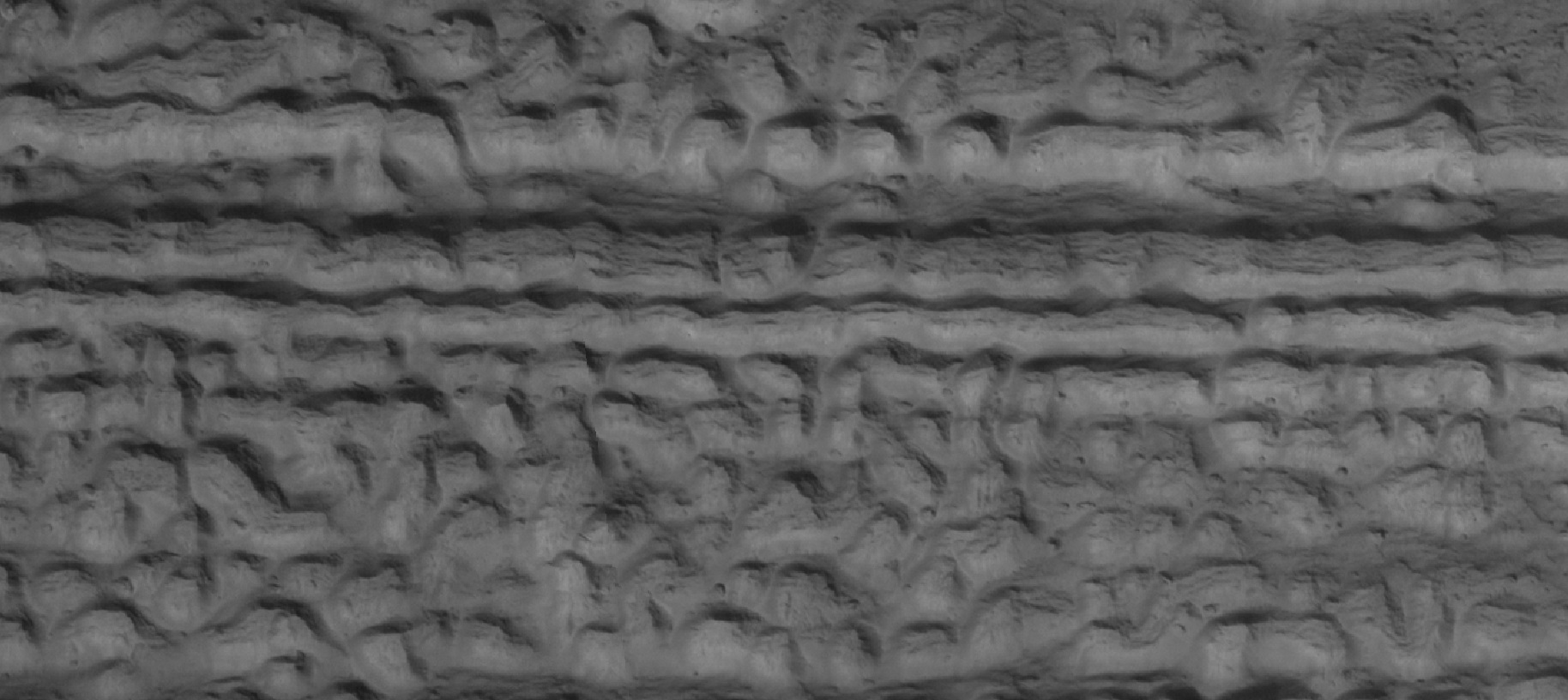
Close view of lineated valley fill (LVF) in valley, as seen by HiRISE under HiWish program. Linear valley flow is ice covered by debris.

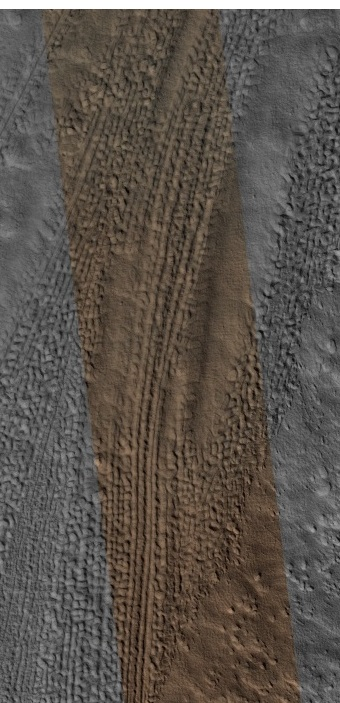
Lineated valley fill in valley, as seen by HiRISE under HiWish program. Linear valley flow is ice covered by debris.

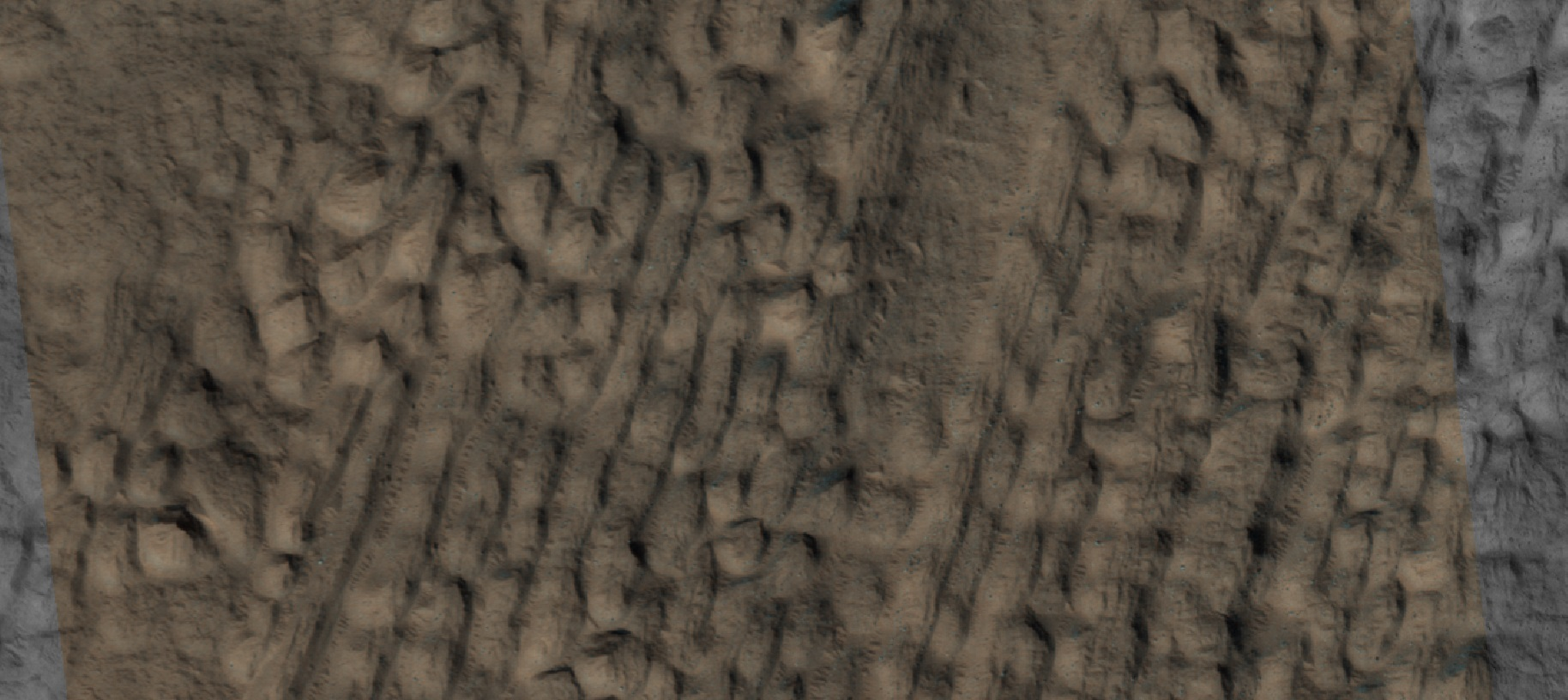
Close view of lineated valley fill (LVF) in valley, as seen by HiRISE under HiWish program. Linear valley flow is ice covered by debris. Picture is about 1 km wide.

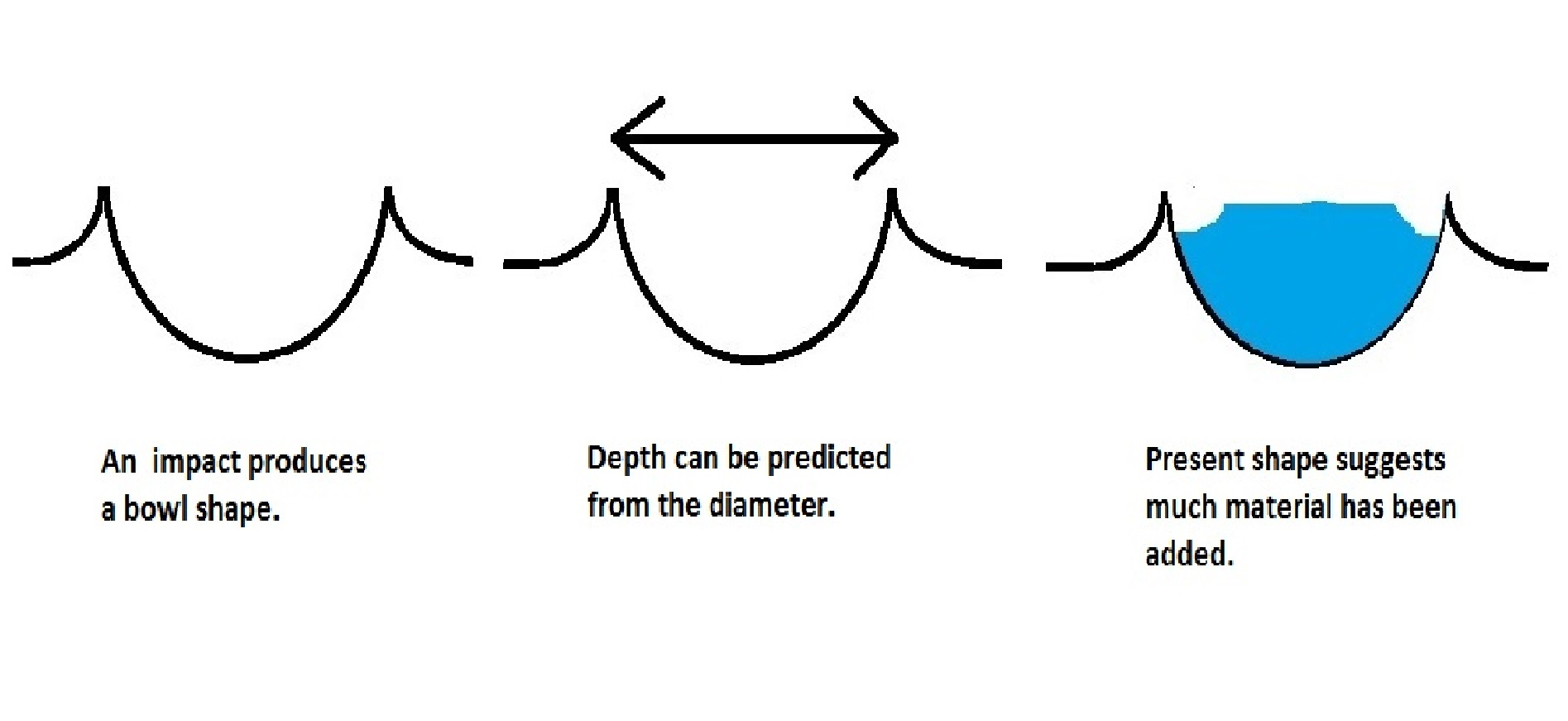
This series of drawings illustrates why researchers believe many craters are full of ice-rich material. The depth of craters can be predicted based upon the observed diameter. Many craters are almost full, instead of having bowl shape; hence it is believed that they have gained much material since they were formed by impact. Much of the extra material is probably ice that fell from the sky as snow or ice-coated dust.

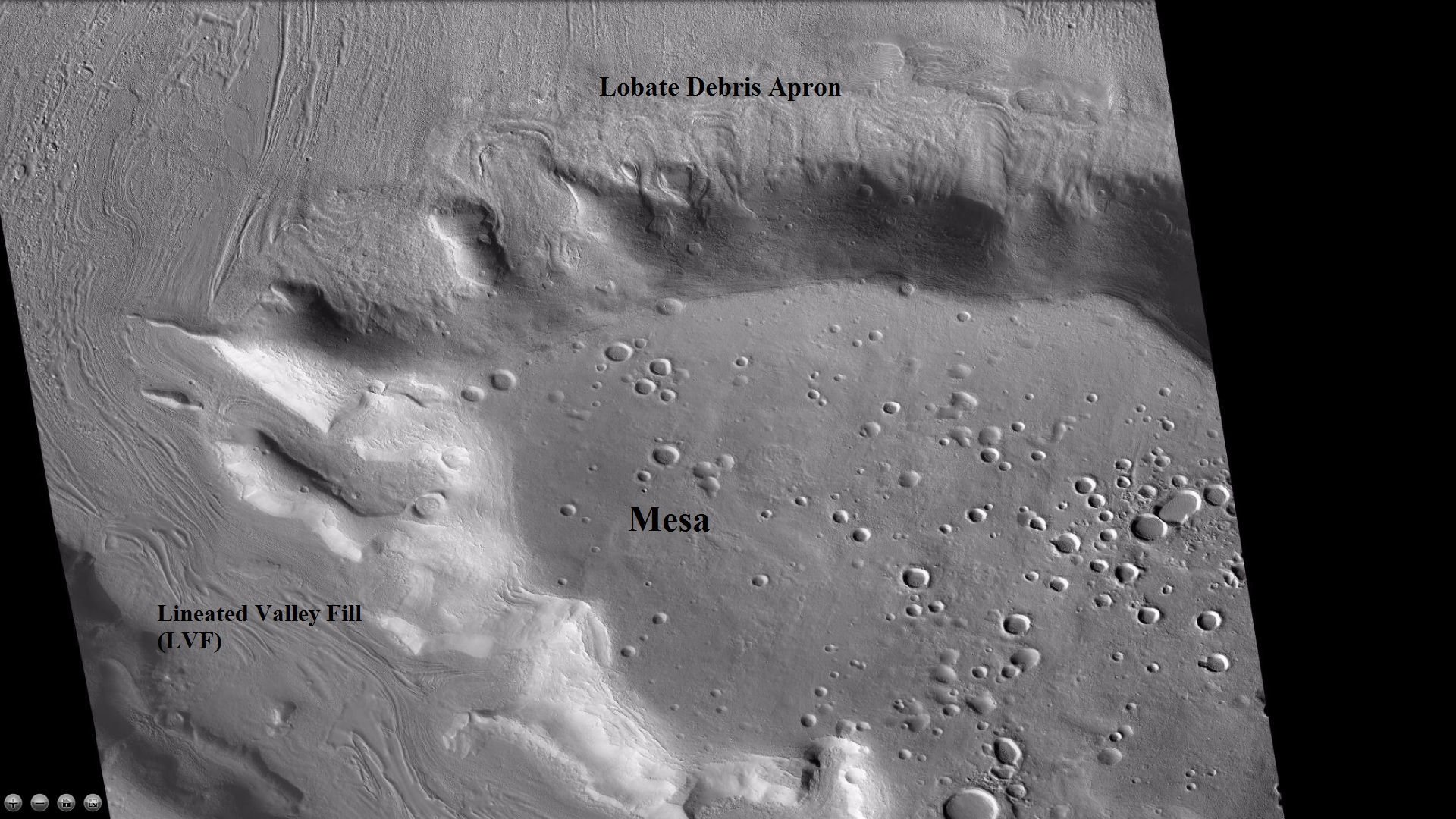
Wide CTX view of mesa showing lobate debris apron (LDA) and lineated valley fill. Both are believed to be debris-covered glaciers. Location is Ismenius Lacus quadrangle.

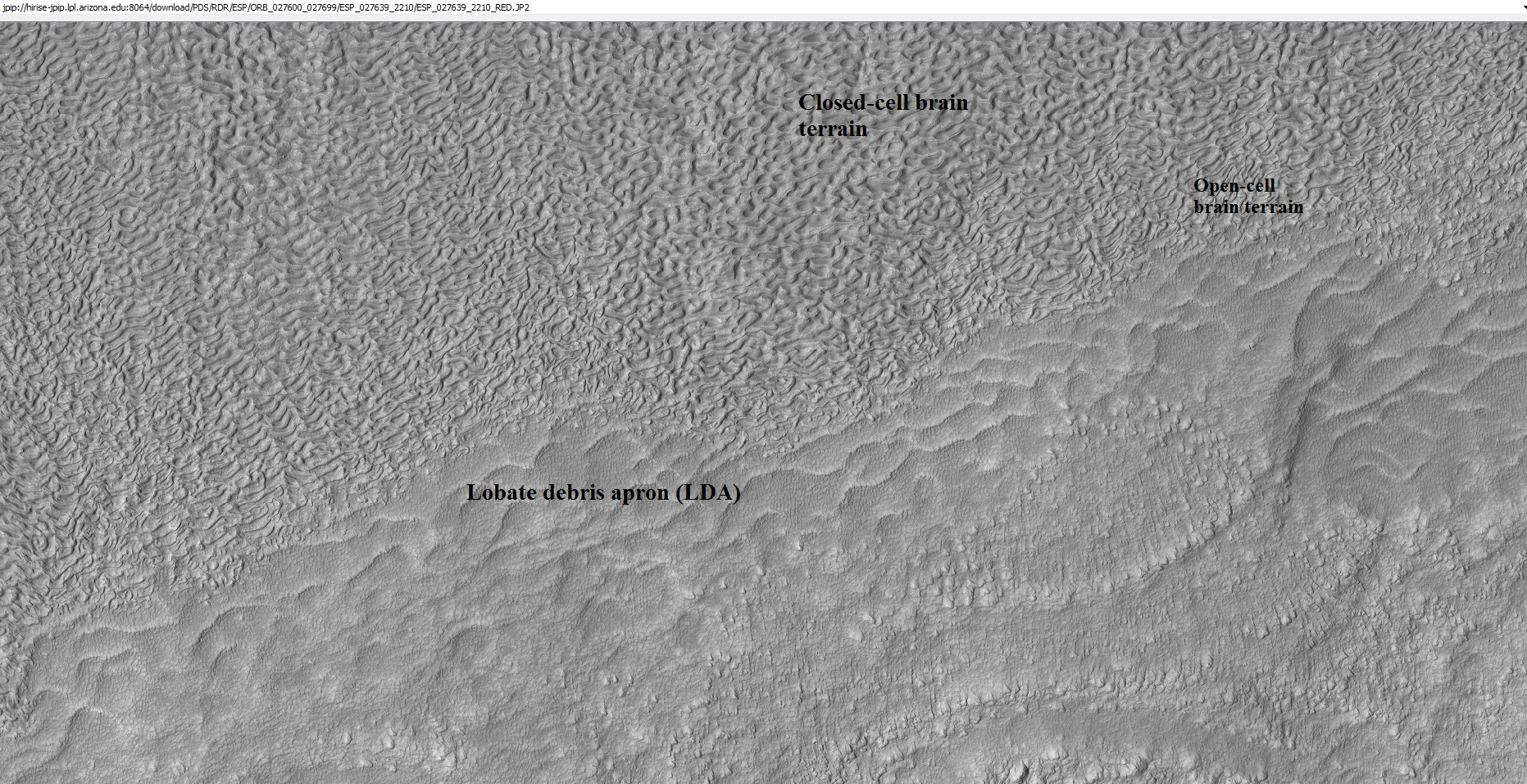
Close-up of lobate debris apron from the previous CTX image of a mesa. Image shows open-cell brain terrain and closed-cell brain terrain, which is more common. Open-cell brain terrain is thought to hold a core of ice. Image is from HiRISE under HiWish program.

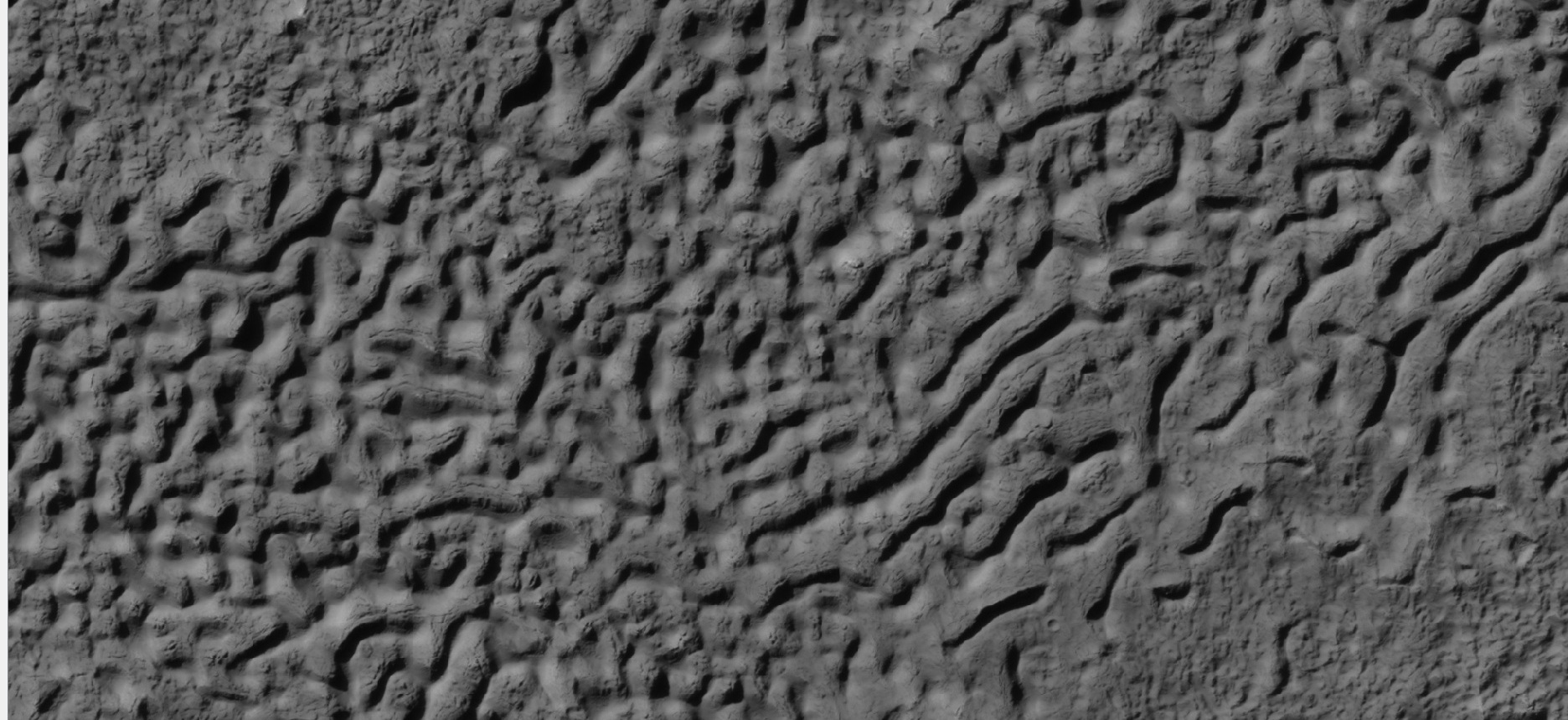
Closed-cell brain terrain, as seen by HiRISE under the HiWish program. This type of surface is common on lobate debris aprons, concentric crater fill, and lineated valley fill.

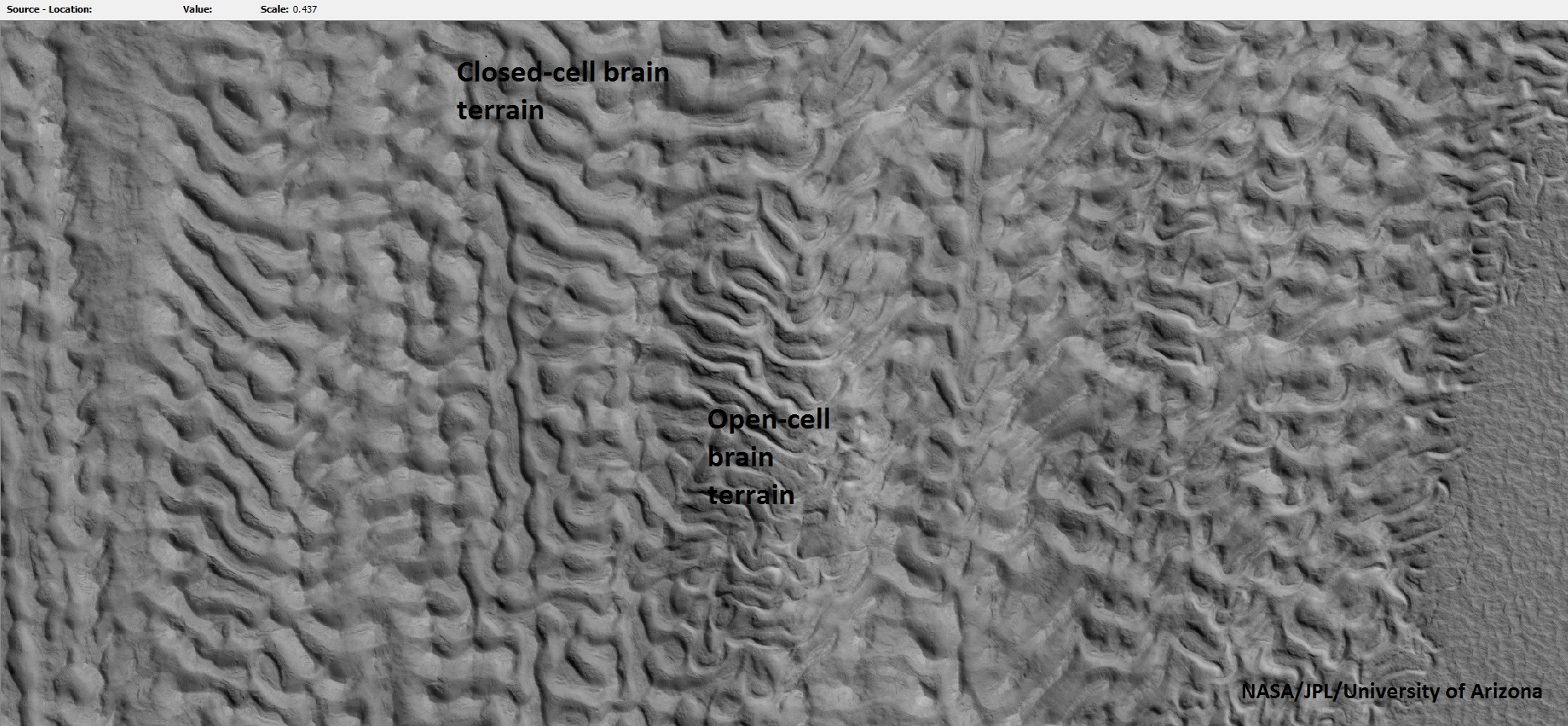
Open and closed-cell brain terrain, as seen by HiRISE, under HiWish program.

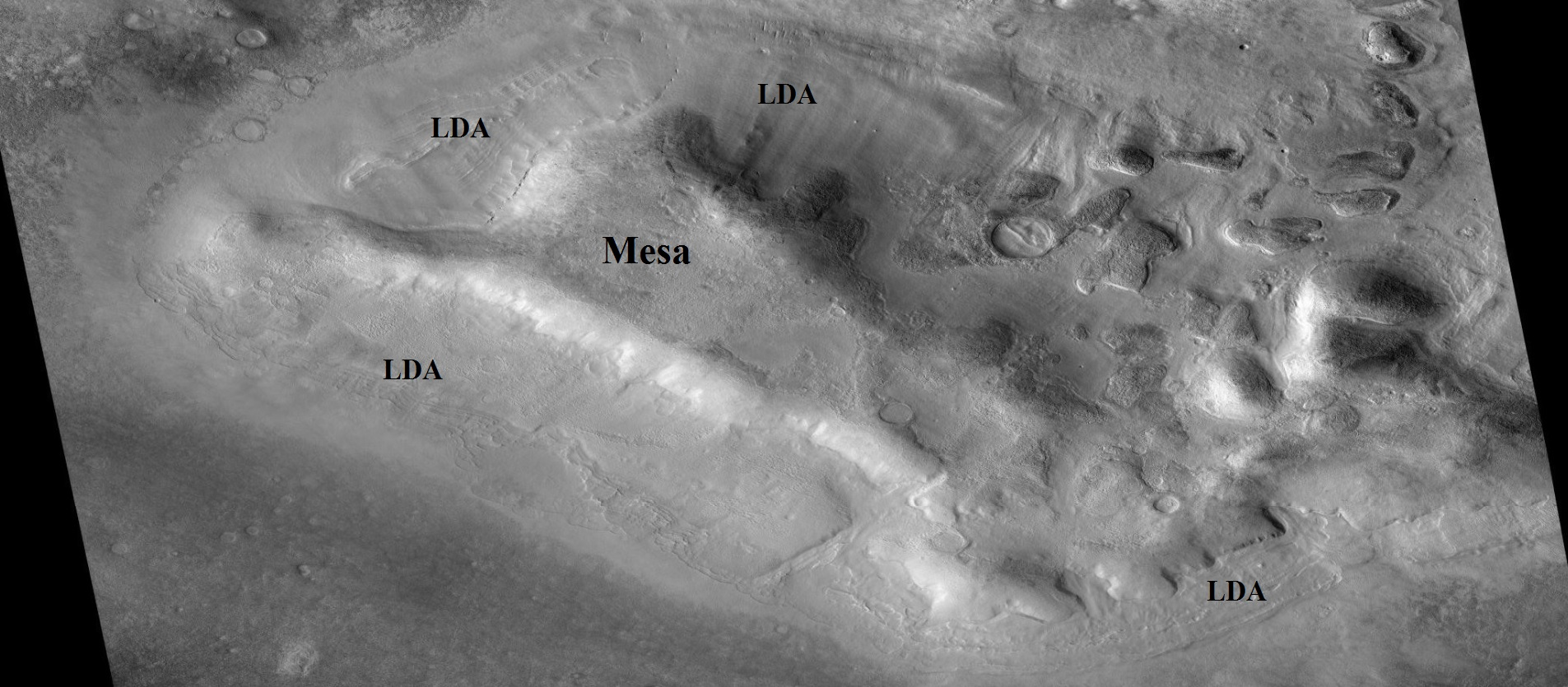
Lobate debris aprons (LDAs) around a mesa, as seen by CTX. Mesa and LDAs are labeled so one can see their relationship. Radar studies have determined that LDAs contain ice; therefore these can be important for future colonists of Mars. Location is Ismenius Lacus quadrangle.

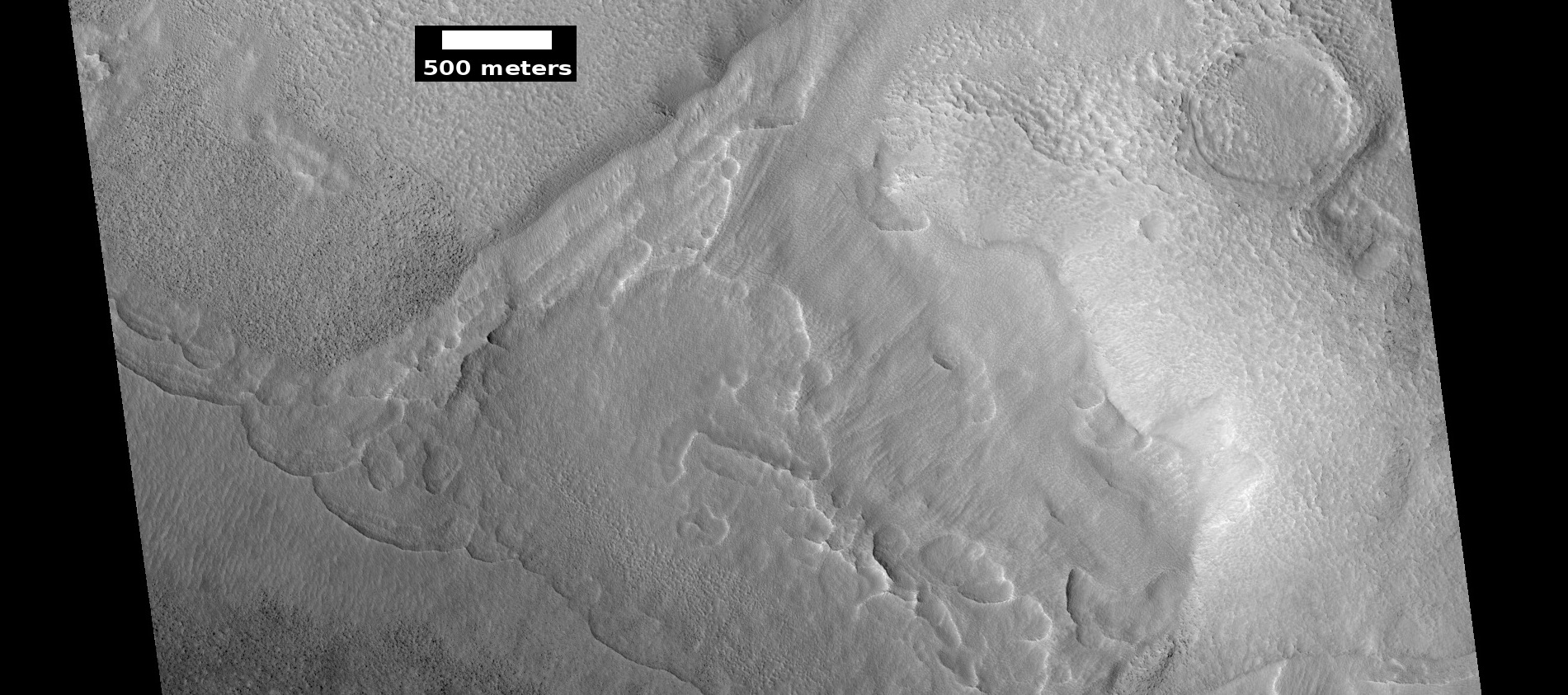
Close-up of lobate debris apron (LDA), as seen by HiRISE under HiWish program

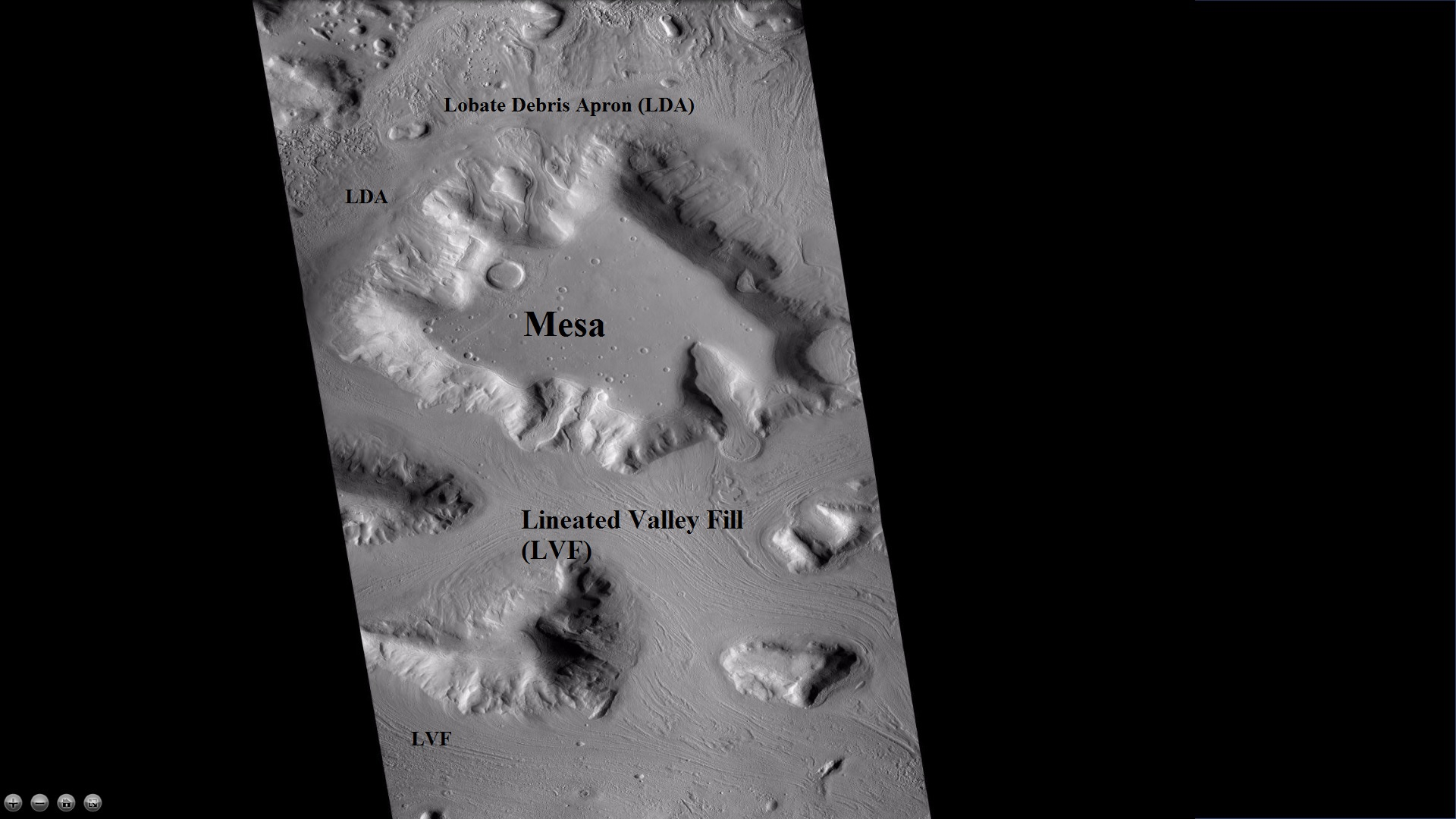
Wide CTX view showing mesa and buttes with lobate debris aprons and lineated valley fill around them. Location is Ismenius Lacus quadrangle.

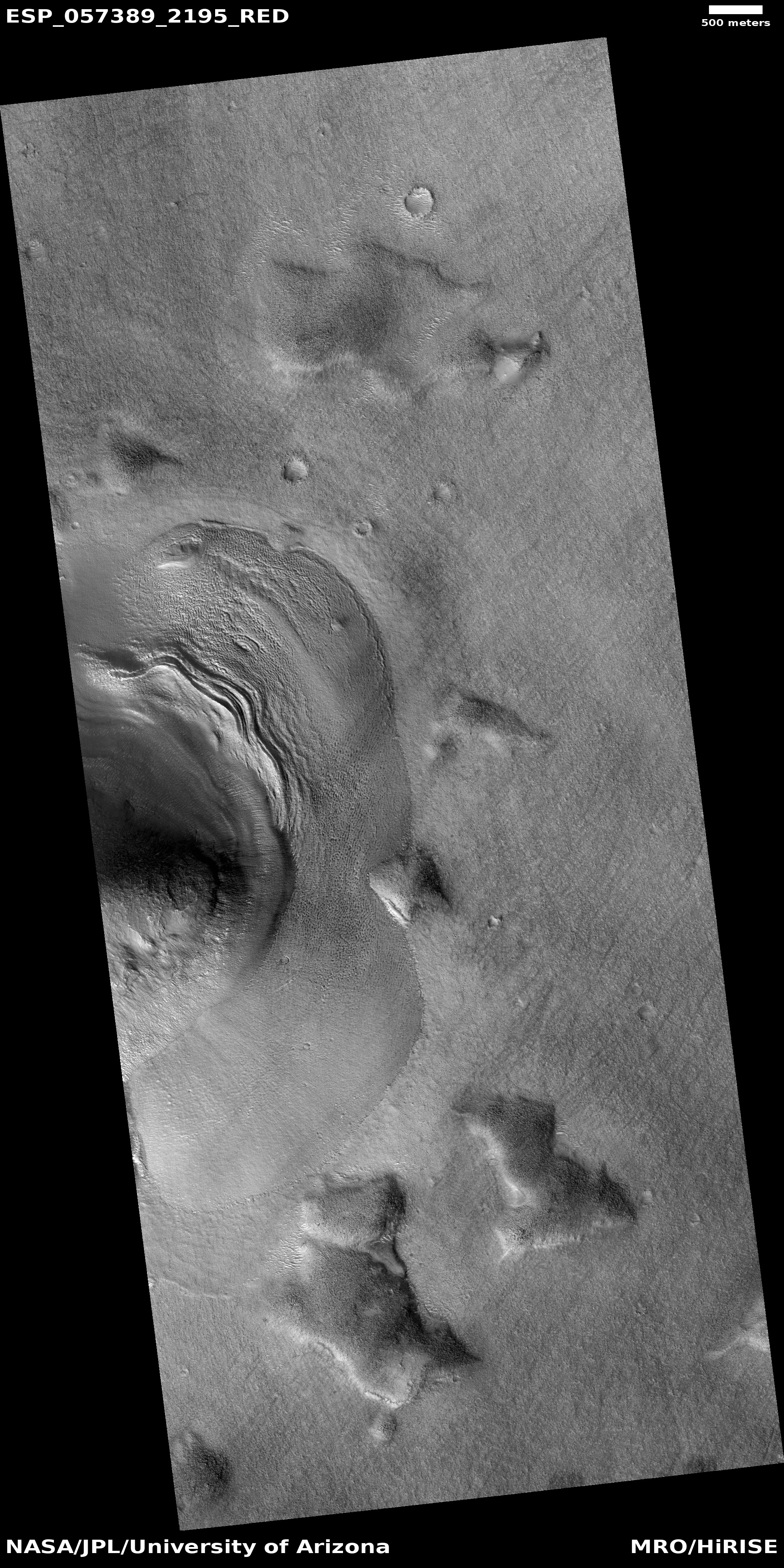
Lobate debris apron around mesa, as seen by HiRISE under HiWish program

=== Tongue-shaped glaciers ===
Some of the glaciers flow down mountains and are shaped by obstacles and valleys; they make a sort of tongue shape.

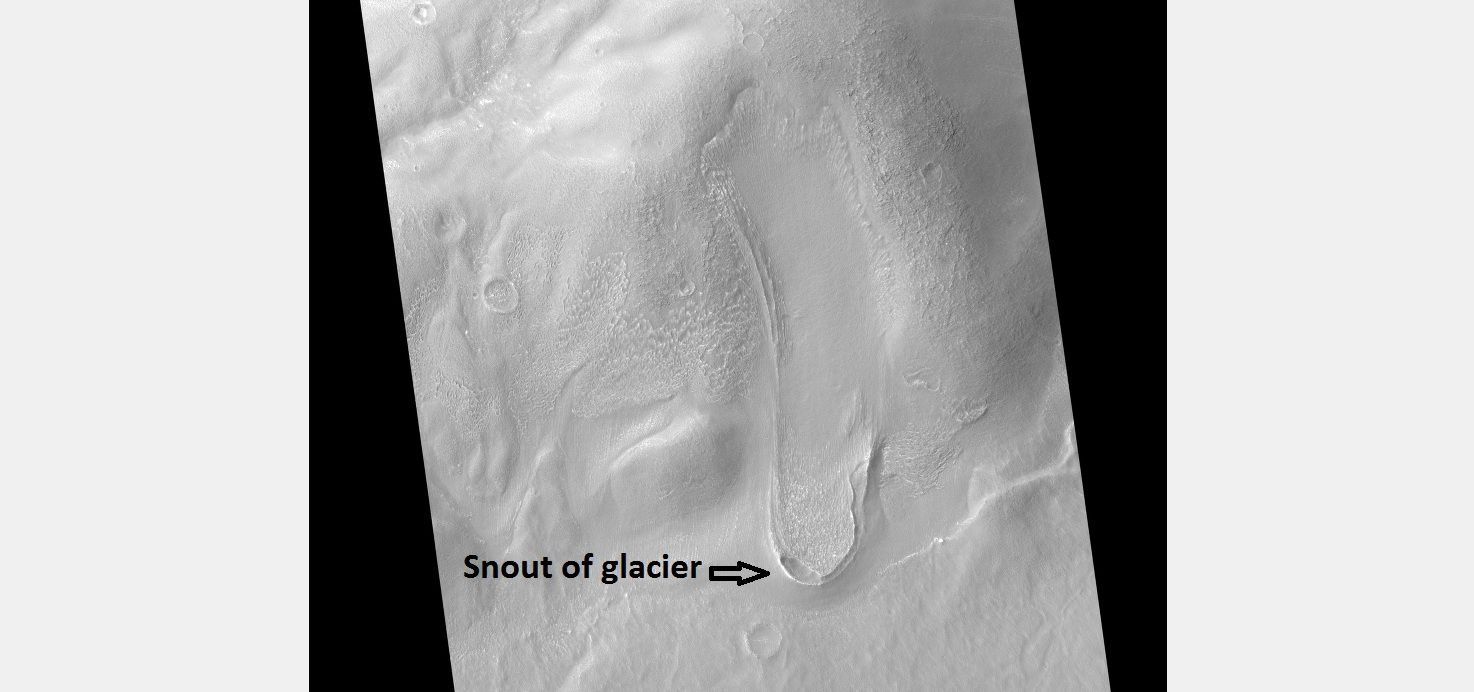
Tongue-shaped glacier, as seen by HiRISE under the HiWish program. Ice may exist in the glacier, even today, beneath an insulating layer of dirt. Location is Hellas quadrangle.

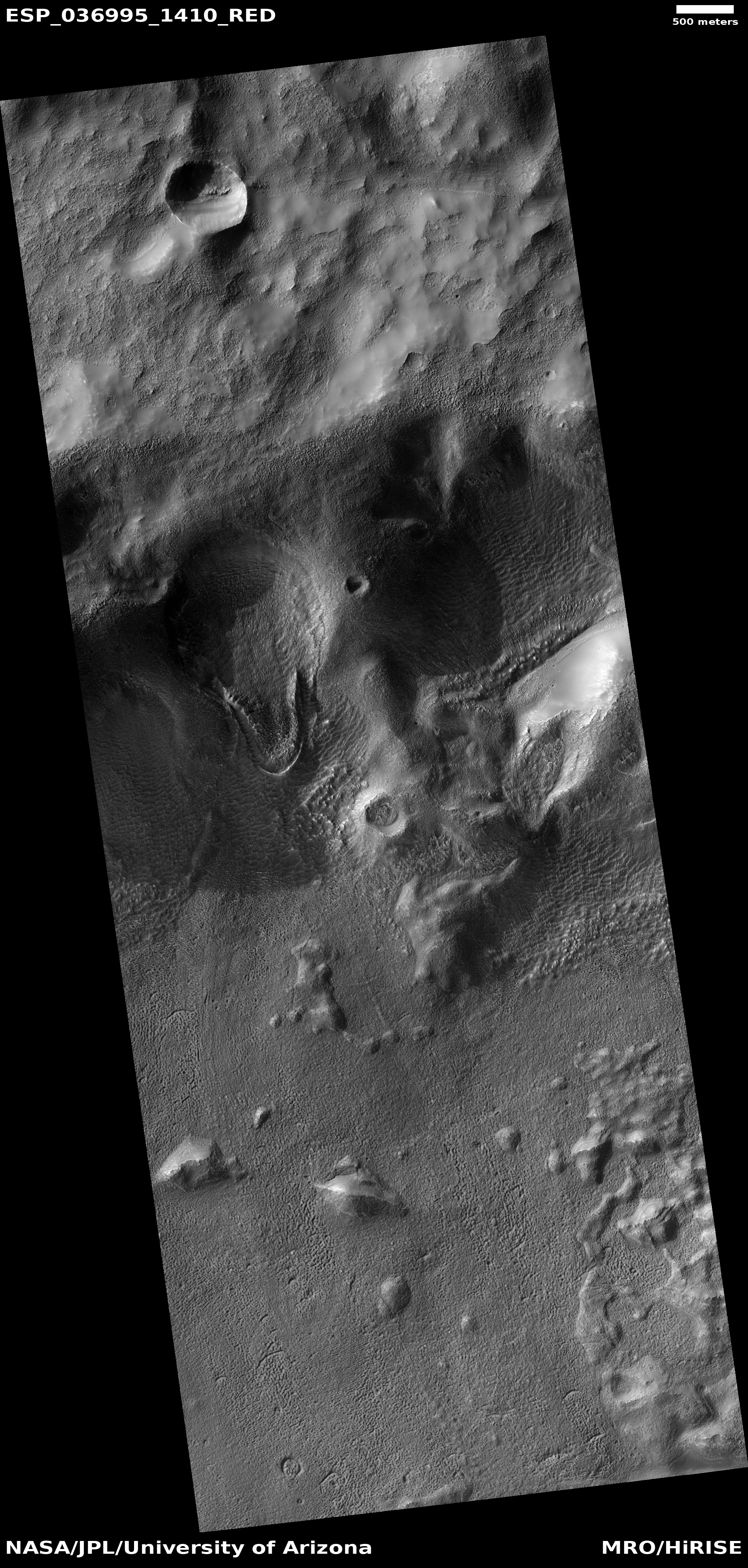
Tongue-shaped glacier, as seen by HiRISE under the HiWish program. Location is Phaethontis quadrangle.

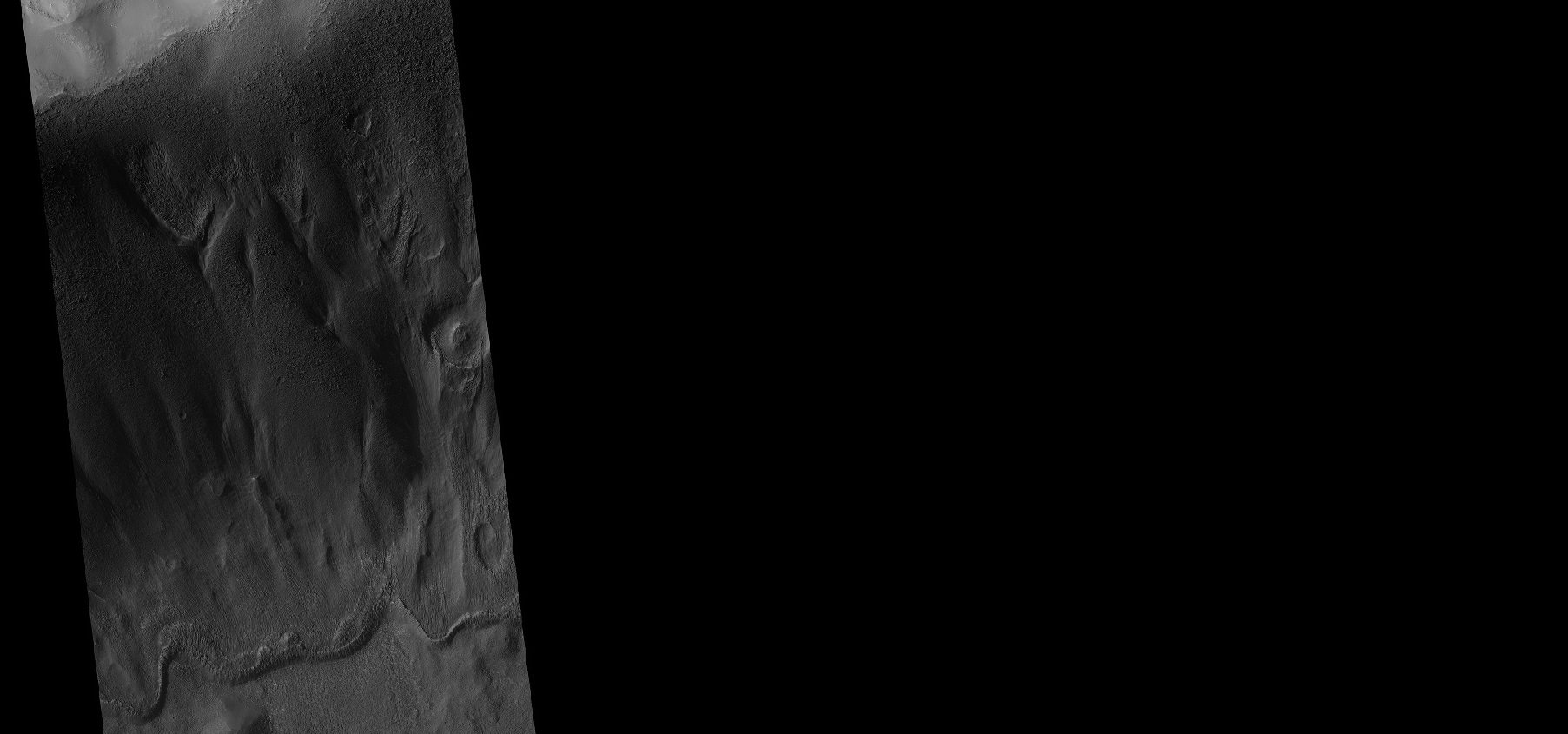
Wide view of several tongue-shaped glaciers on wall of crater, as seen by HiRISE under the HiWish program. The glaciers are of different sizes and lie at different levels. Some of these are greatly enlarged in pictures which follow.

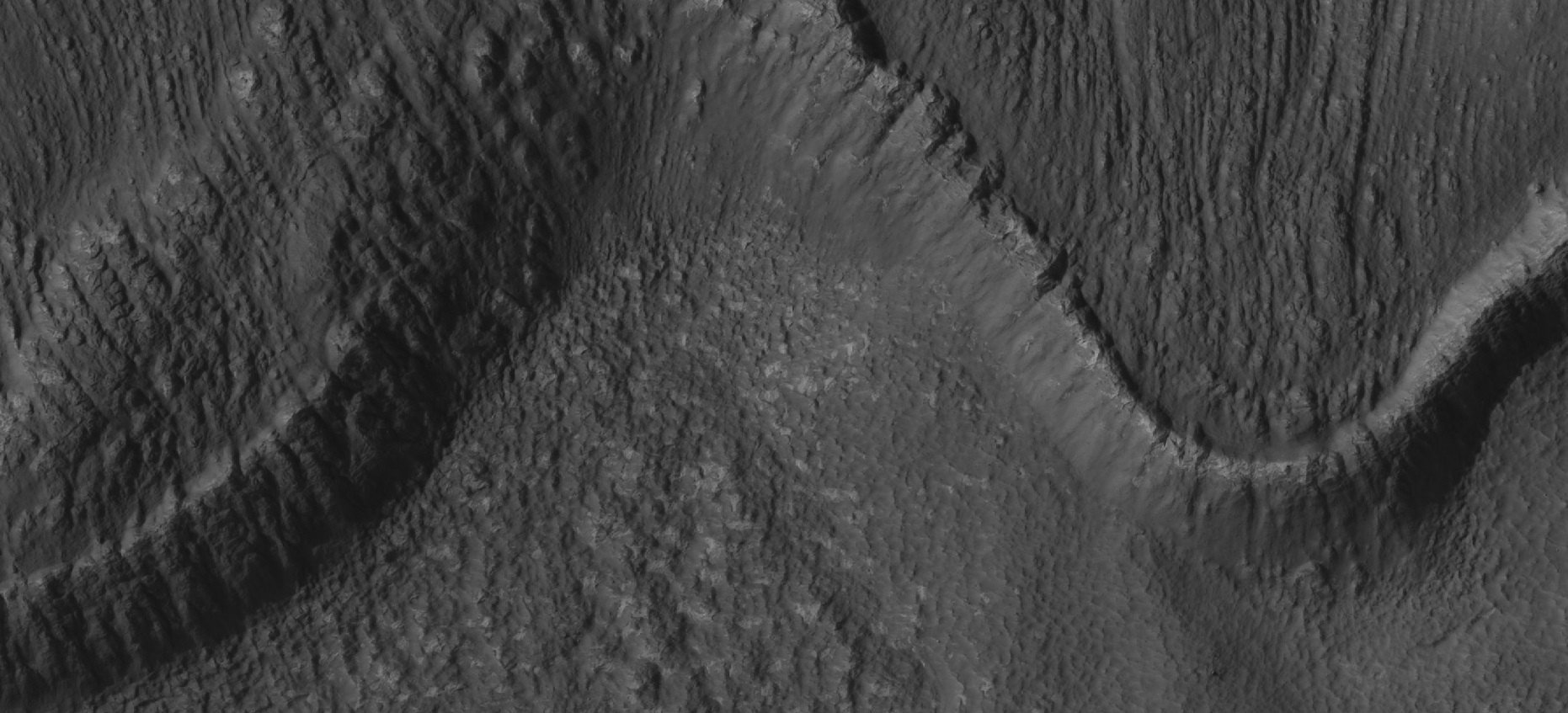
Close-up of the snouts of two glaciers from the previous image, as seen by HiRISE under the HiWish program. These are towards the bottom left of the previous image.

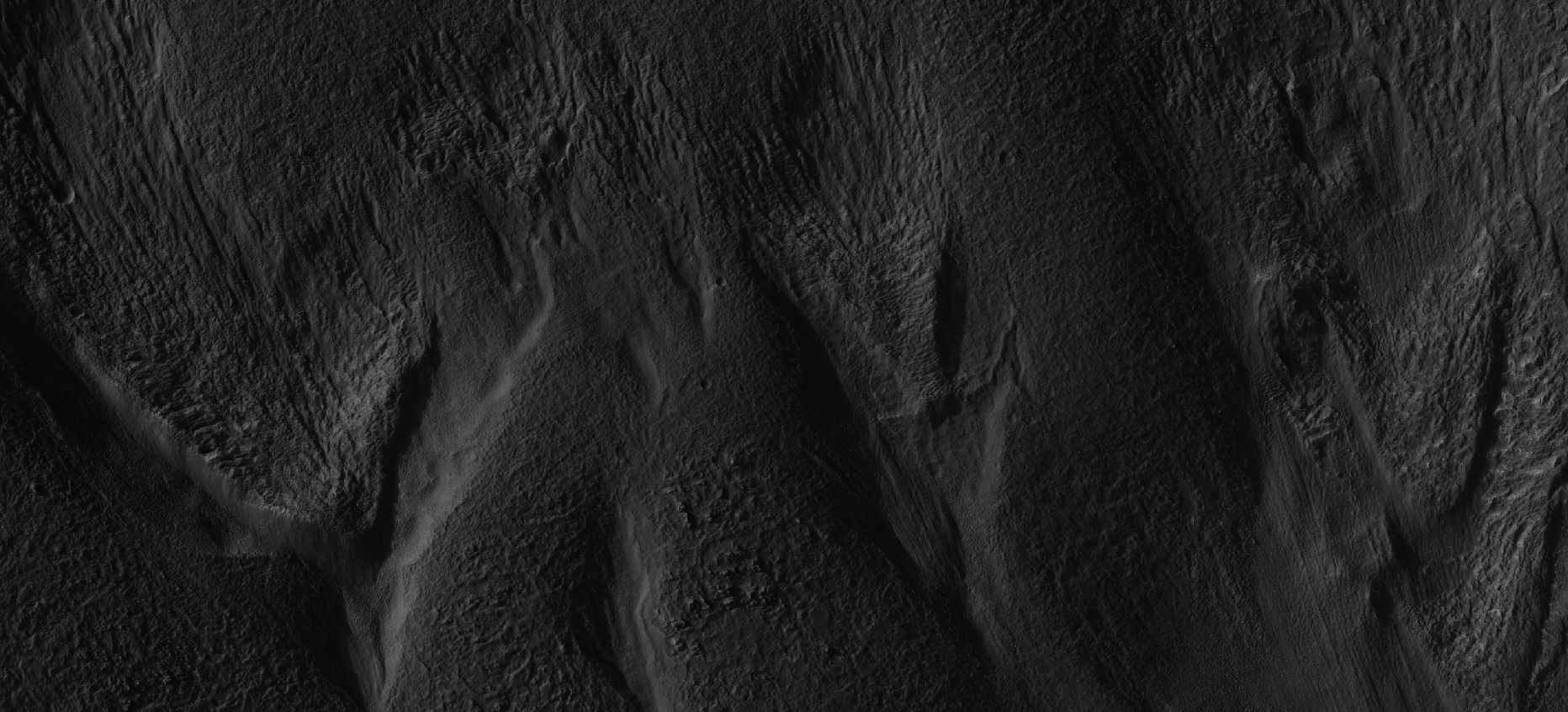
Close-up of small glaciers from a previous image, as seen by HiRISE under the HiWish program. Some of these glaciers seem to be just starting to form.

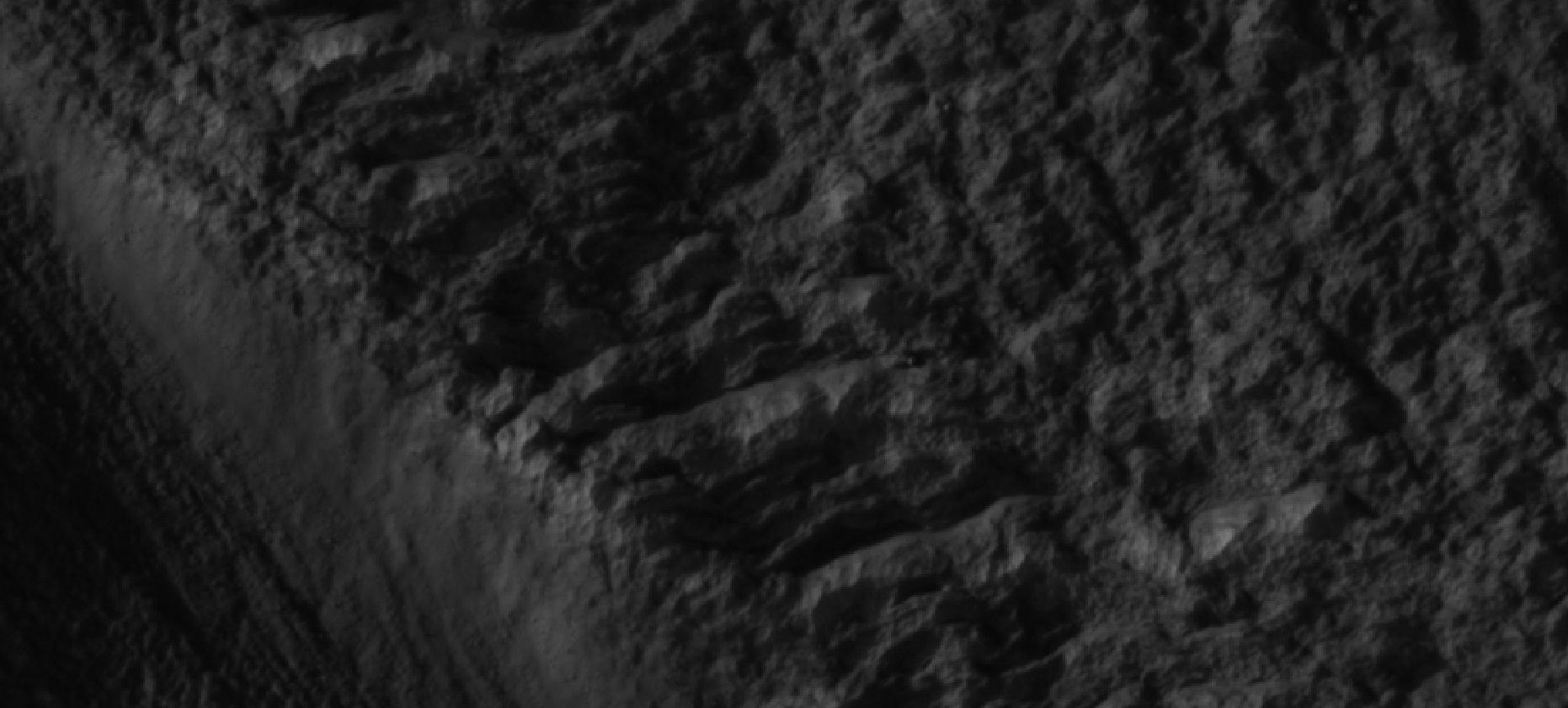
Close-up of the edge of one of the glaciers on the bottom of the wide view from a previous image Picture was taken by HiRISE under the HiWish program.

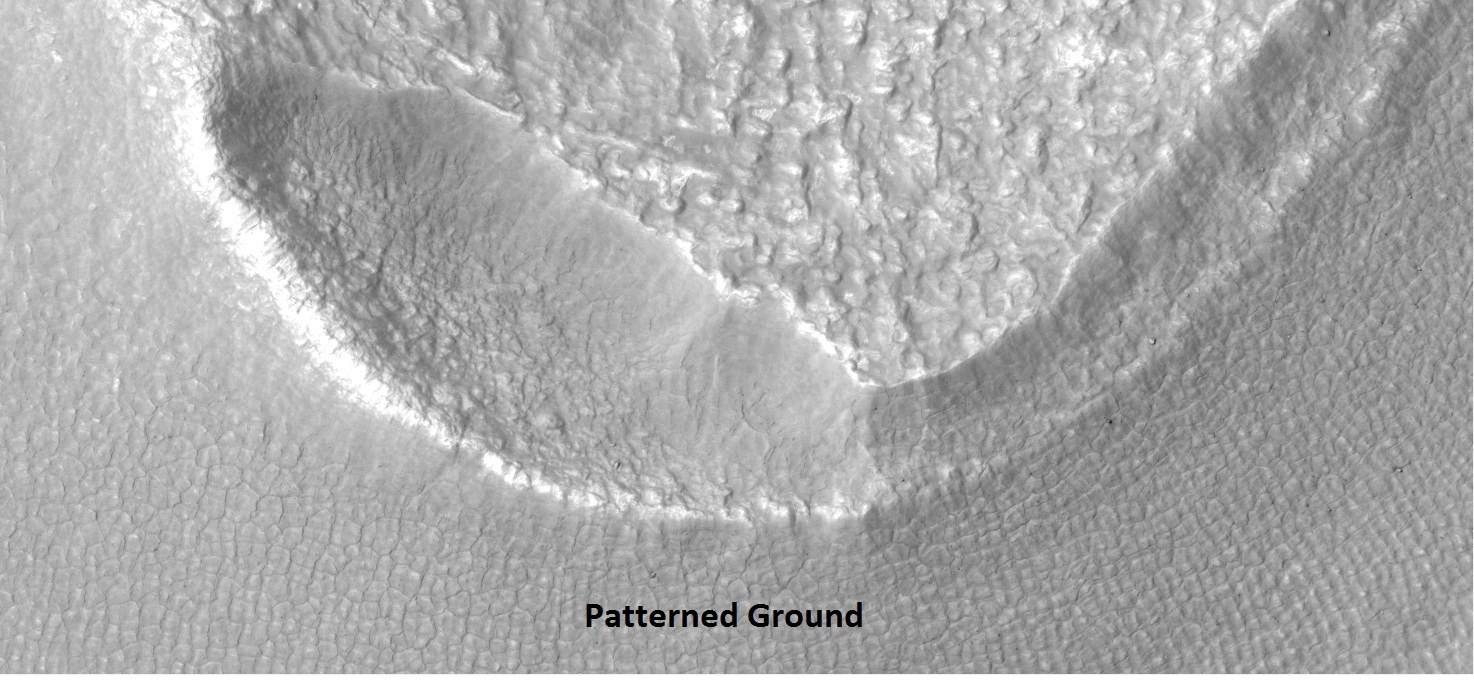
Close-up of tongue-shaped glacier, as seen by HiRISE under the HiWish program. Resolution is about 1 meter, so one can see objects a few meters across in this image. Ice may exist in the glacier, even today, beneath an insulating layer of dirt. Location is Hellas quadrangle.

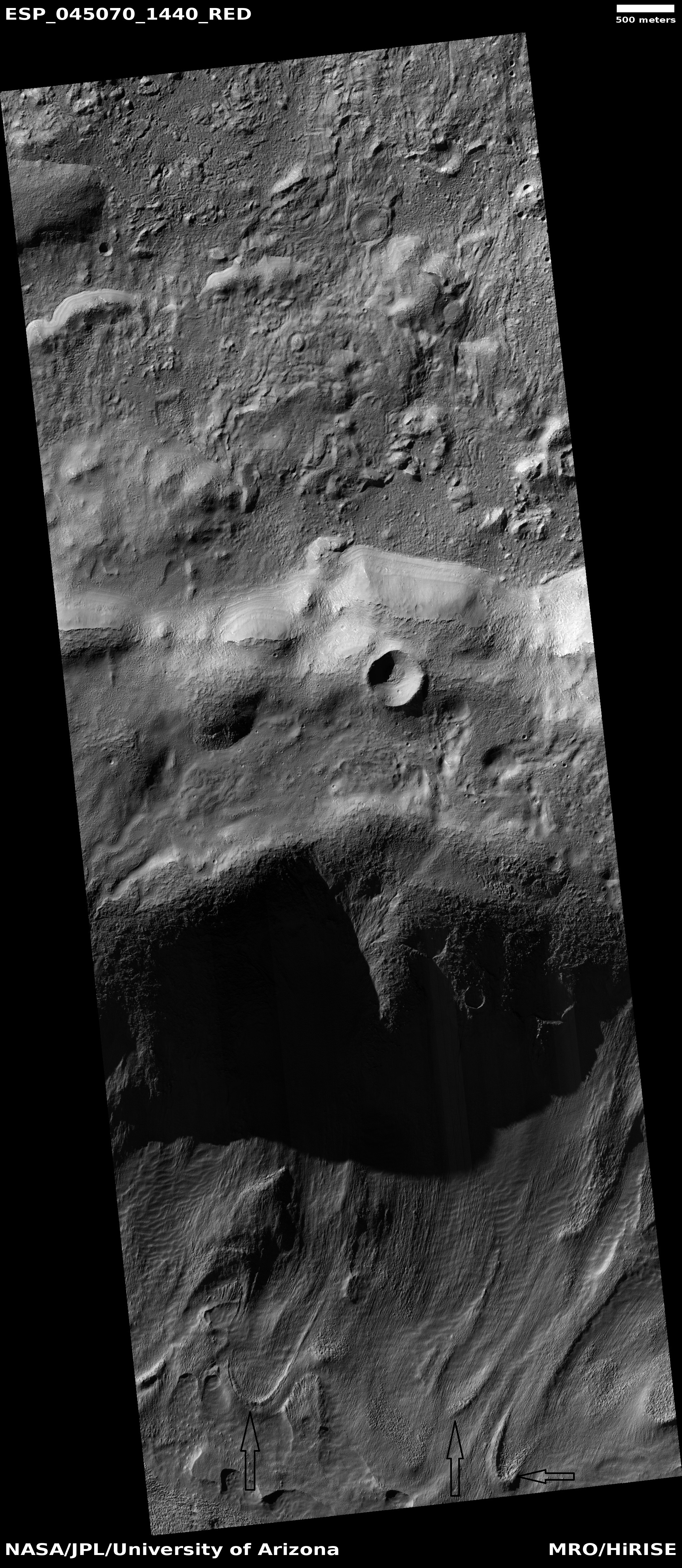
Tongue-shaped glaciers indicated with arrows, as seen by HiRISE under the HiWish program

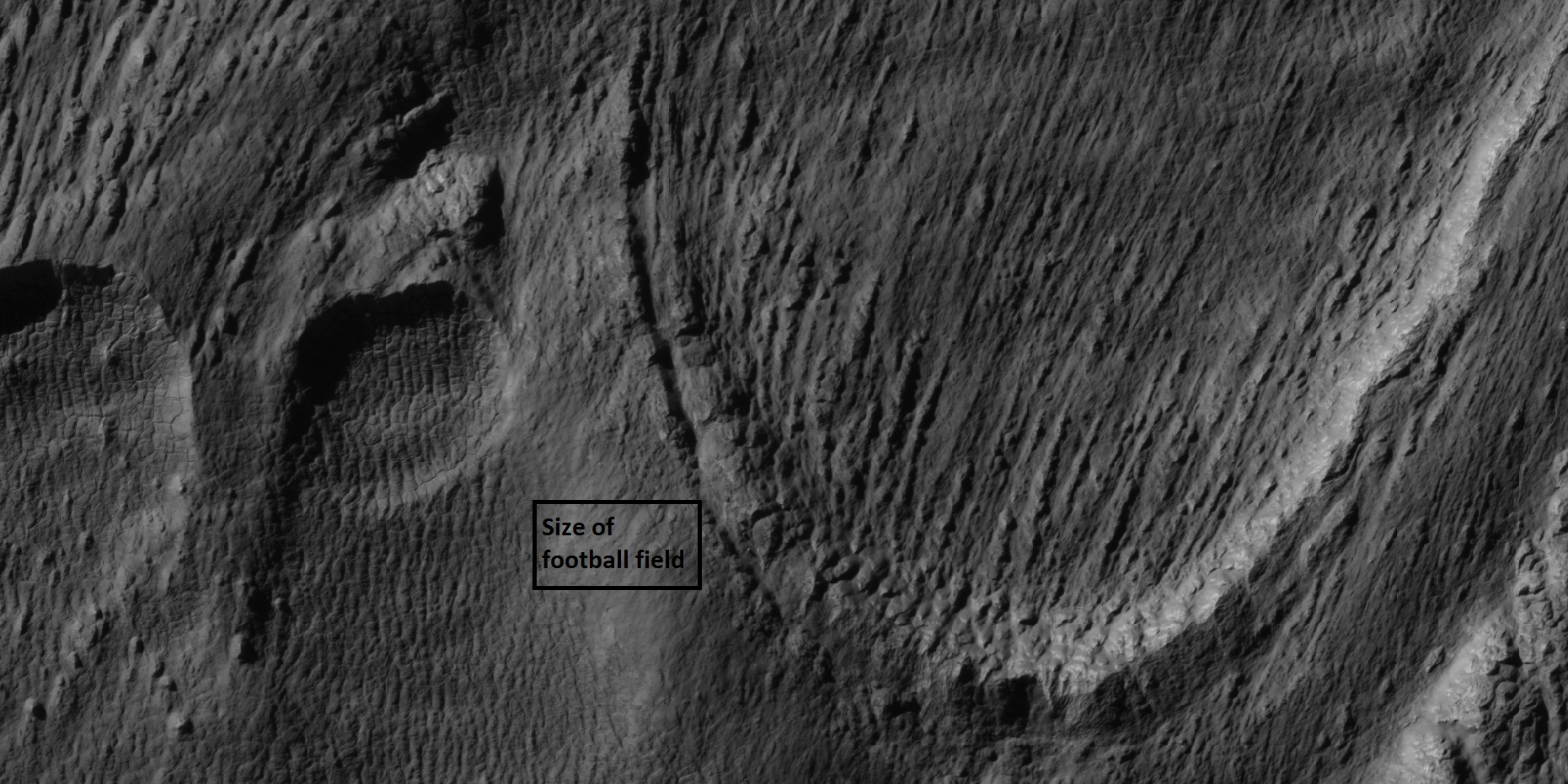
Close view of snout of glacier, as seen by HiRISE under the HiWish program High center polygons are visible. Box shows size of football field.

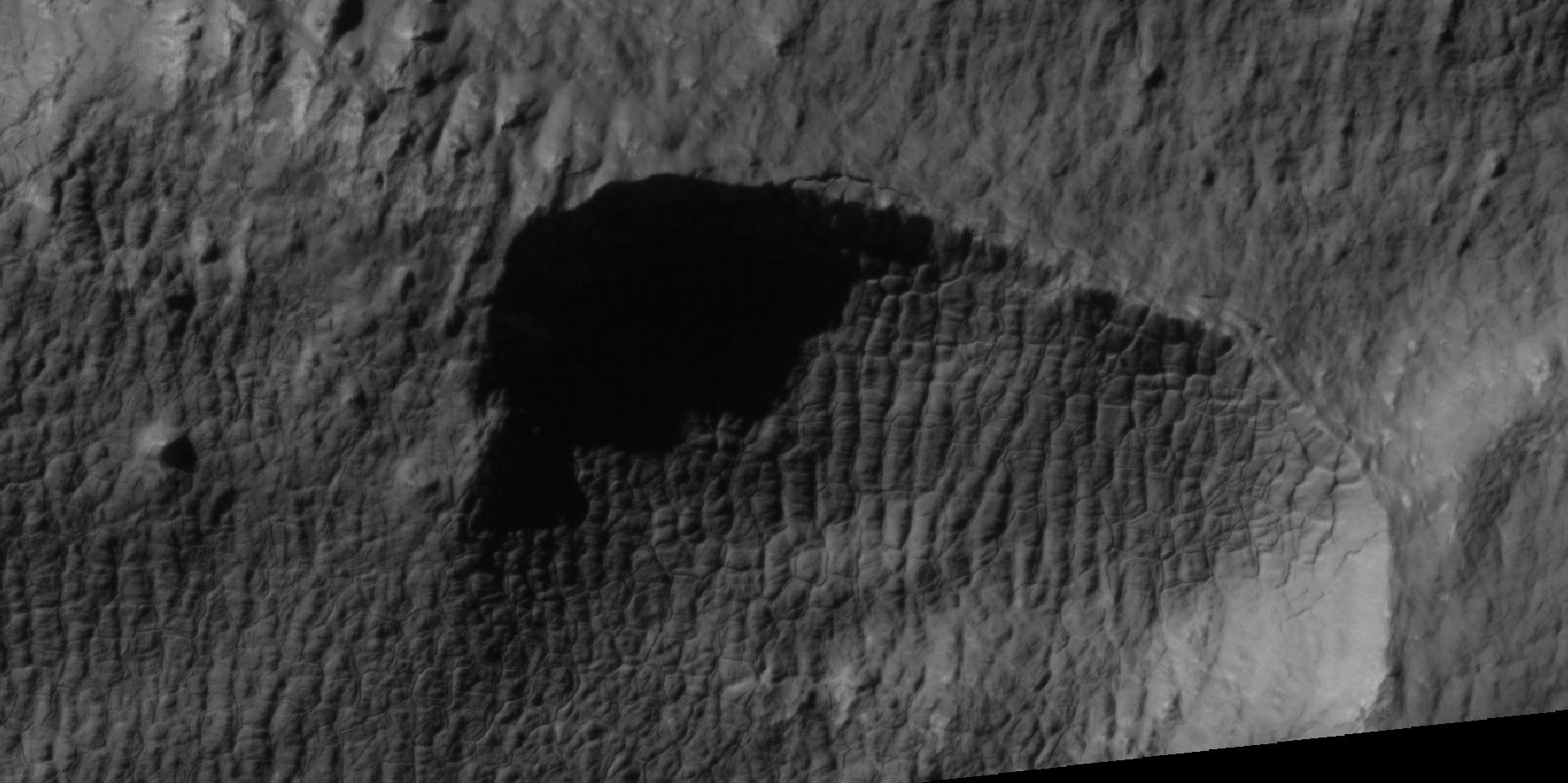
Close view of high center polygons near glacier, as seen by HiRISE under the HiWish program

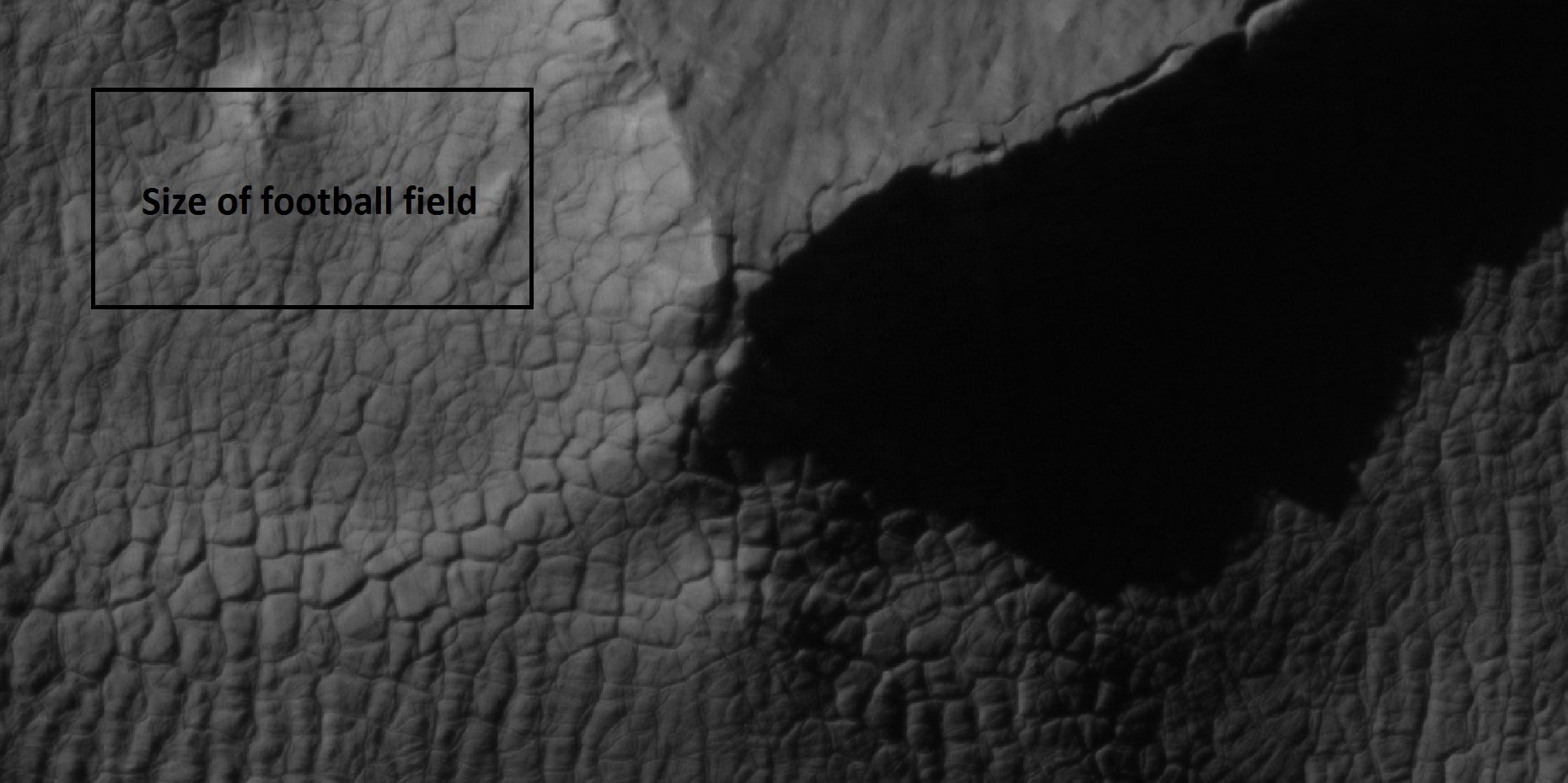
Close view of high center polygons near glacier, as seen by HiRISE under the HiWish program Box shows size of football field.

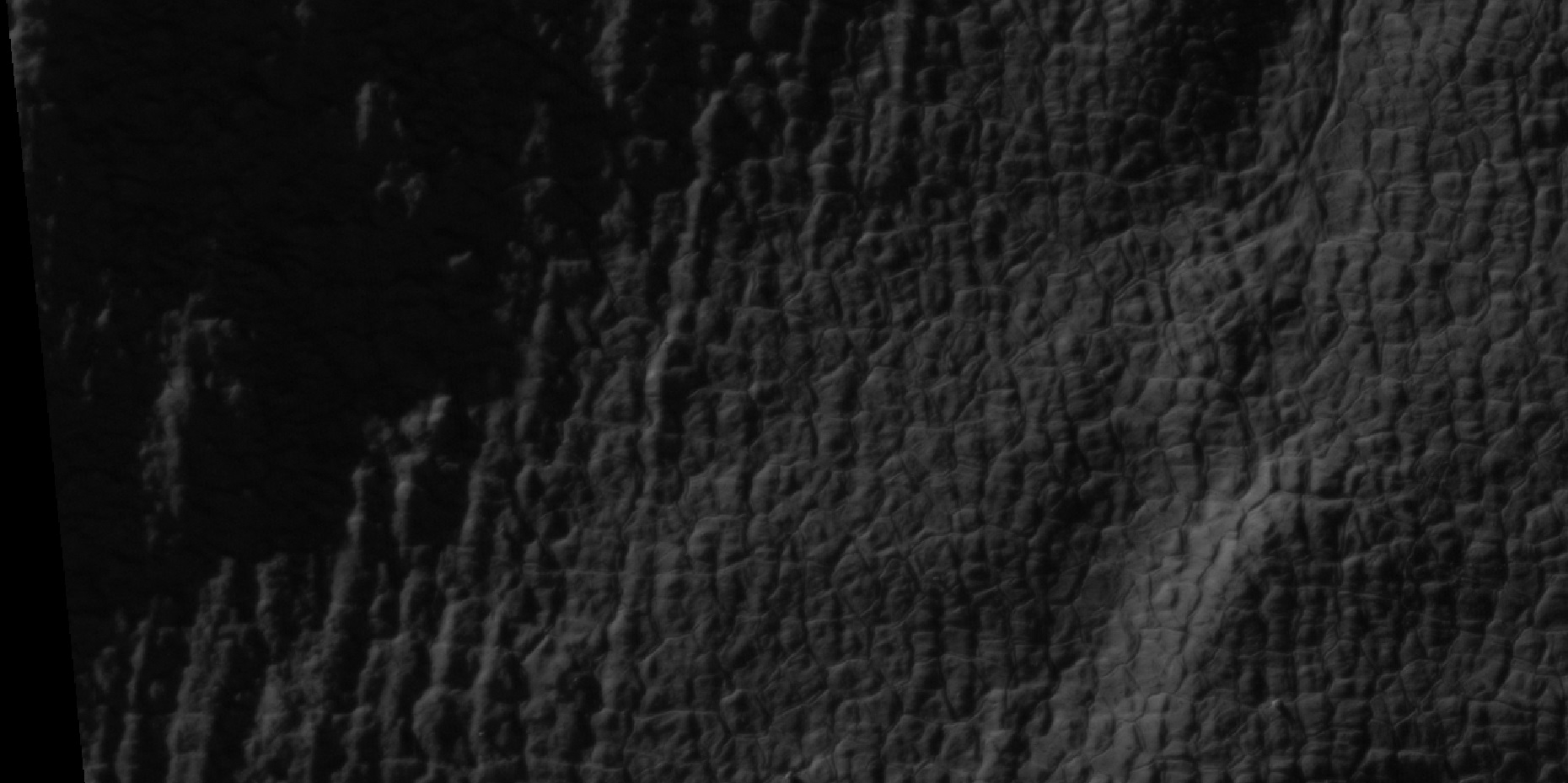
Close view of high center polygons near glacier, as seen by HiRISE under the HiWish program

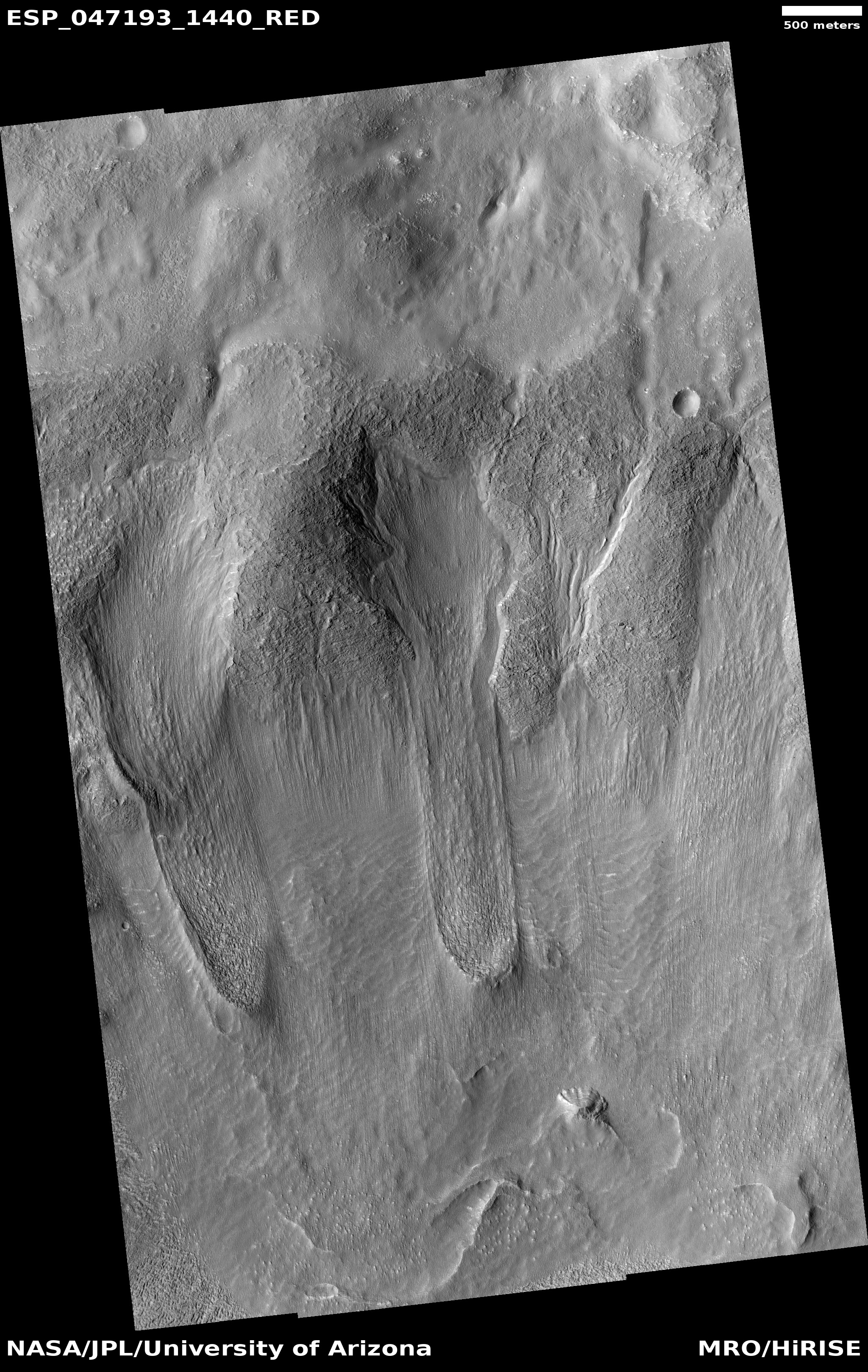
Wide view of tongue-shaped flows, as seen by HiRISE under the HiWish program

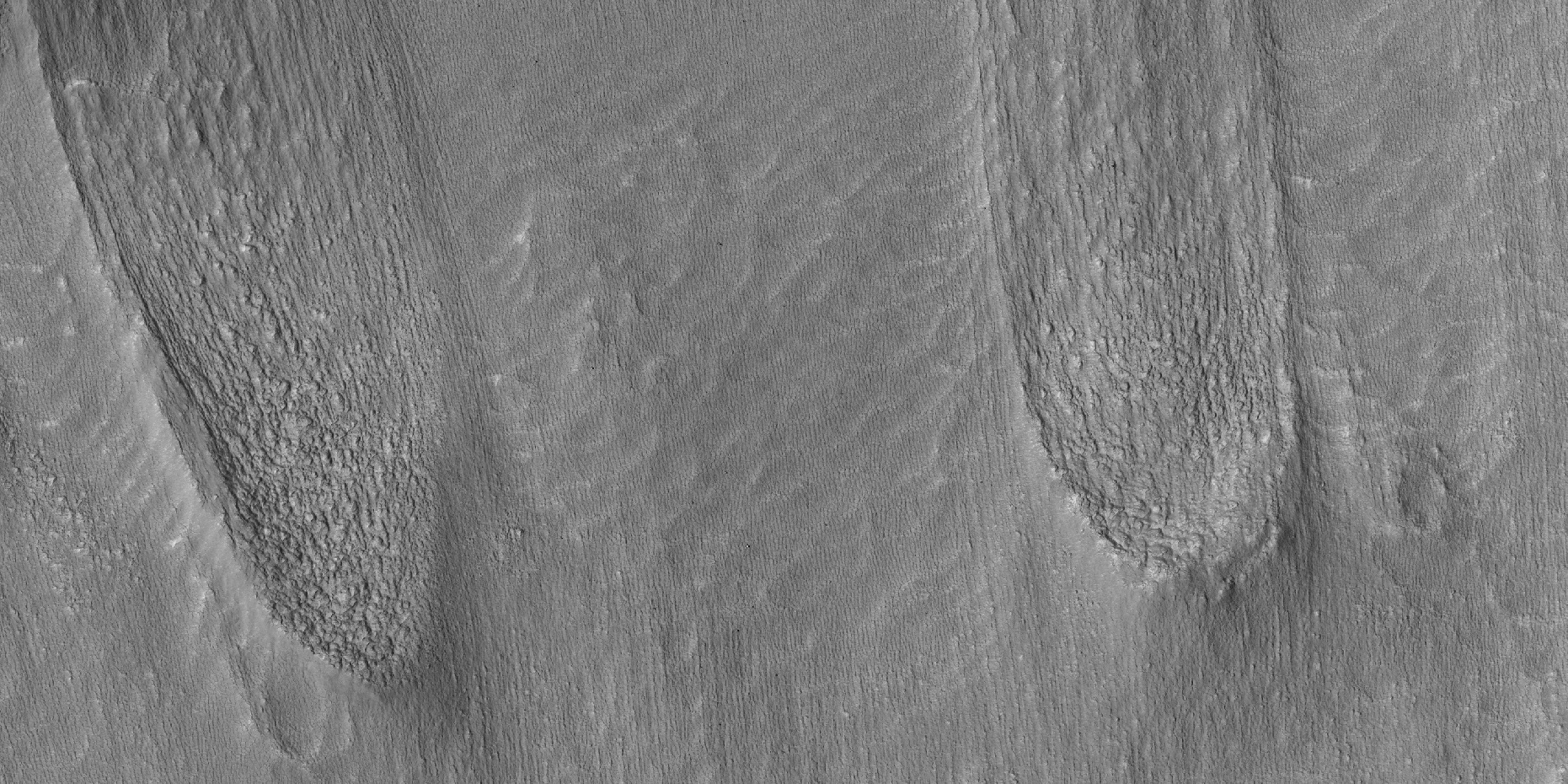
Close view of tongue-shaped flows, as seen by HiRISE under the HiWish program

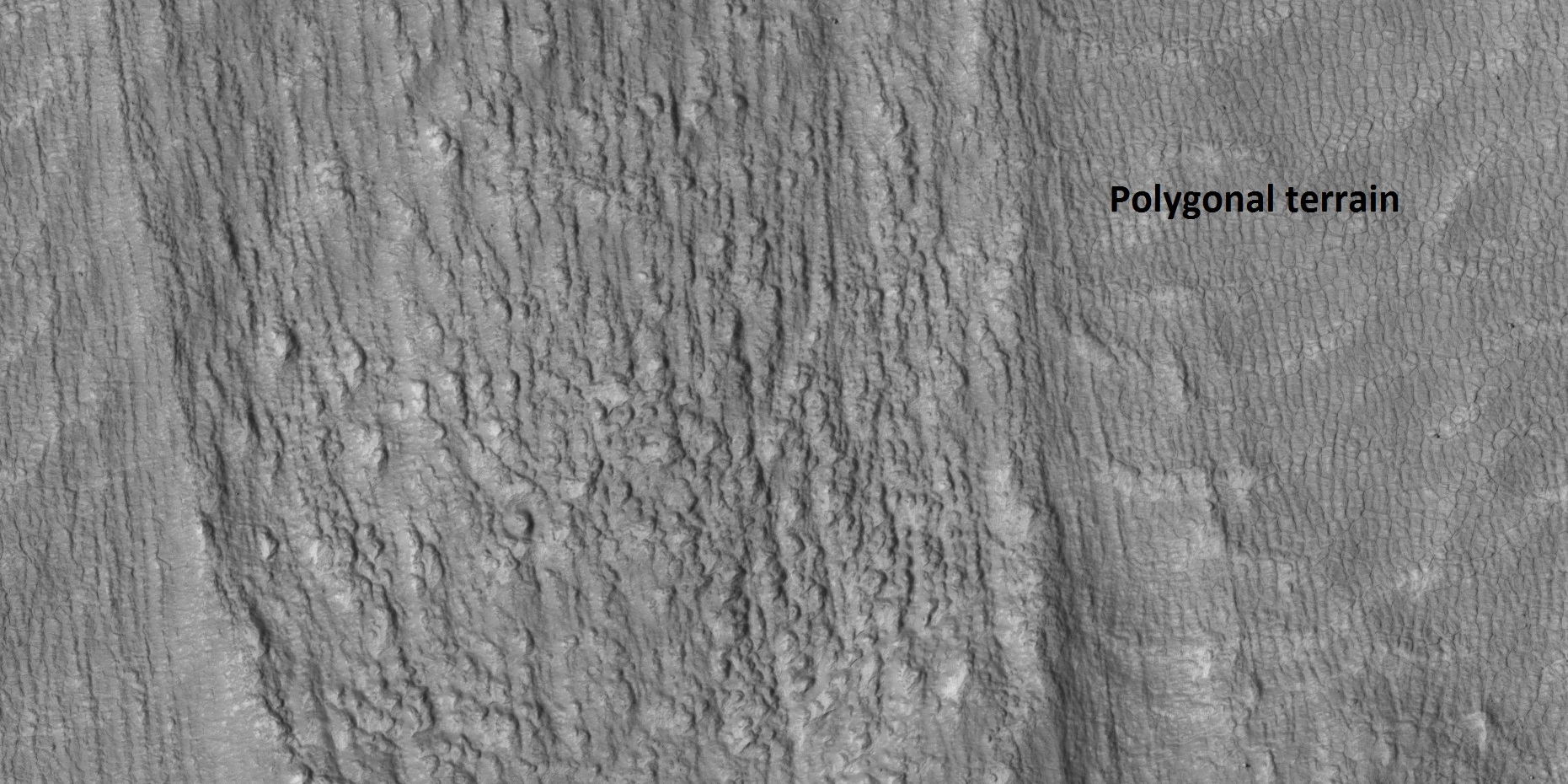
Close view of tongue-shaped flows and polygonal terrain (which is labeled), as seen by HiRISE under the HiWish program

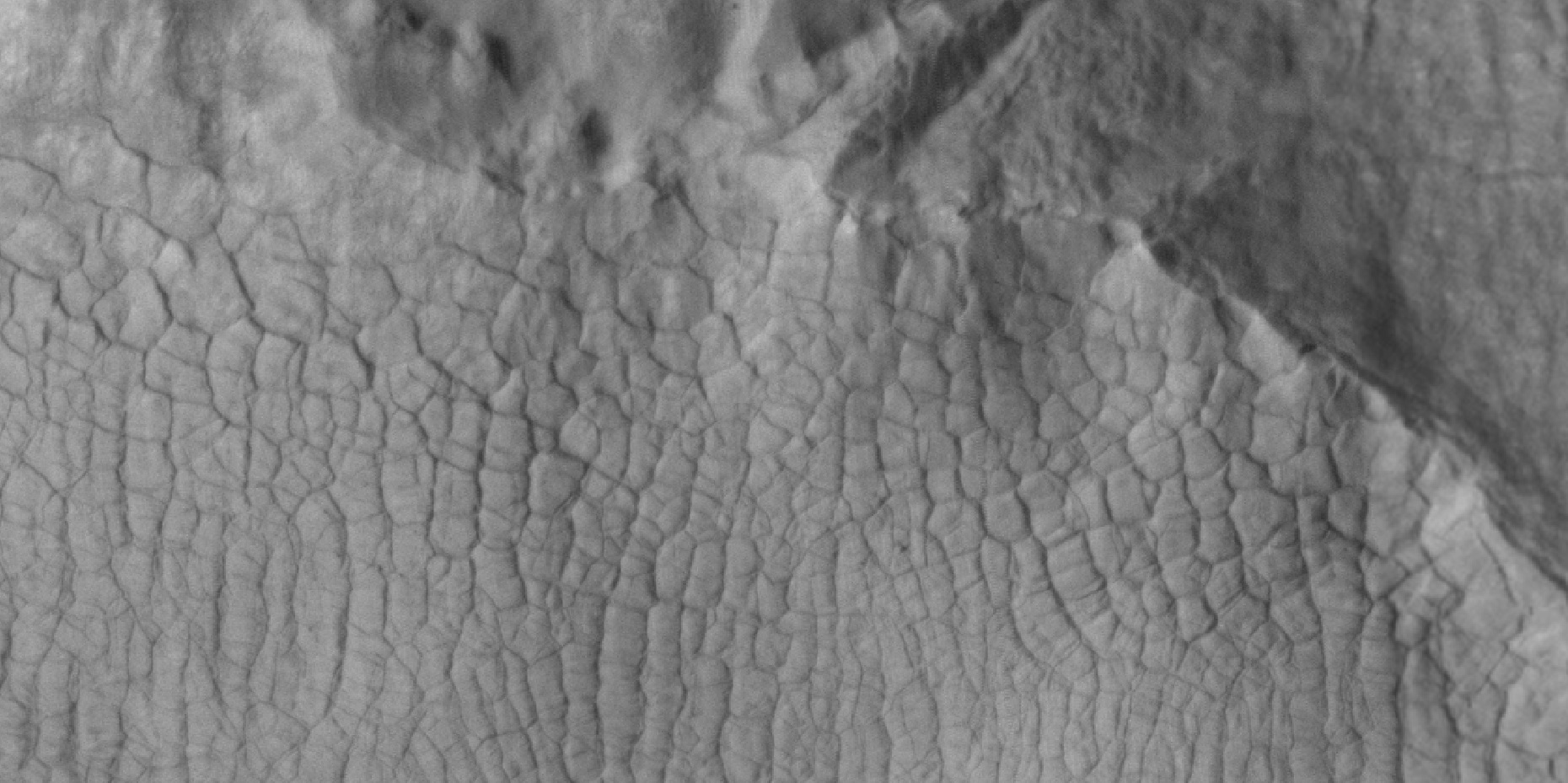
Close view of polygonal terrain near tongue-shaped flows, as seen by HiRISE under the HiWish program

=== Hummocky relief ===
A hummocky relief resembling Northern Sweden's Veiki moraines has been found in Nereidum Montes. The relief is hypothesized to result from the melting of a Martian glacier.

There is no current evidence of any glaciers on any of the volcanoes on Mars.

== Ice sheet ==
There is much evidence for a large ice sheet that existed in the south polar region of the planet. A large number of eskers which form under ice are found there. The field of eskers make up the Dorsa Argentea Formation. The ice sheet had an area twice that of the state of Texas.

Evidence also is building up for the past existence of an ice sheet in the Tharsis region. It would have been in the Late Hesperian time period. When it melted it may have helped to form a northern ocean.

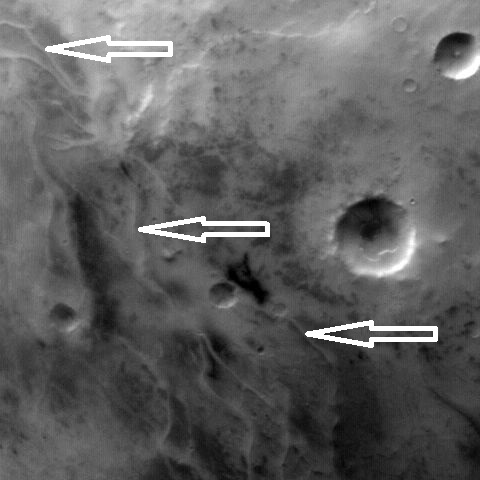
Ridges, believed to be eskers of the Dorsa Argentea Formation, as seen by Mars Global Surveyor wide angle MOC. White arrows point to the ridges.

== Ground ice ==
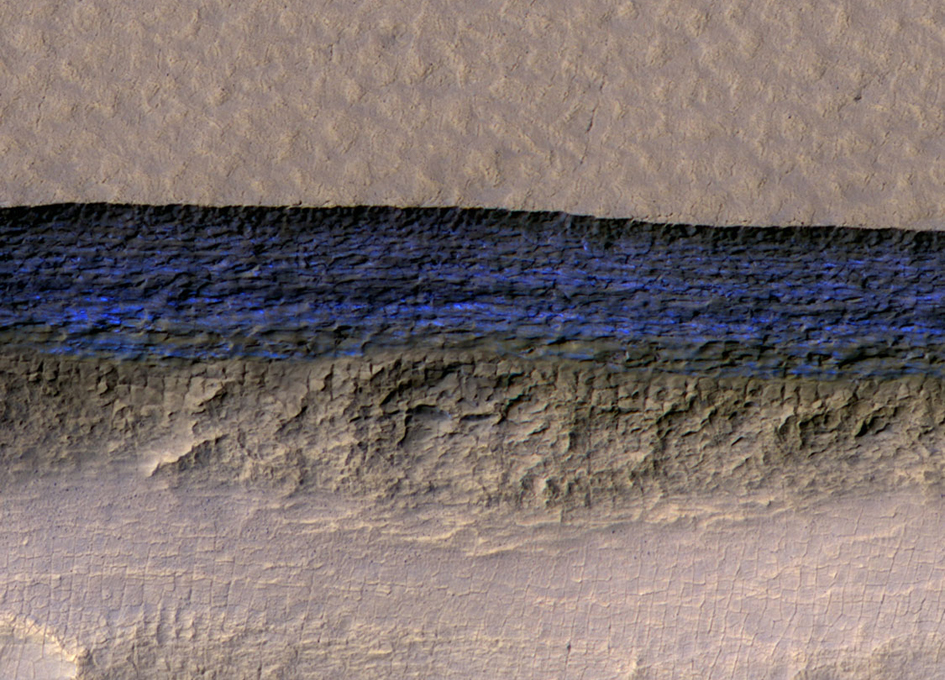
A cross-section of underground water ice is exposed at the steep slope that appears bright blue in this enhanced-color view from the MRO. The scene is about 500 meters wide. The scarp drops about 128 meters from the level ground, The ice sheets extend from just below the surface to a depth of 100 meters or more

Mars has vast glaciers hidden under a layer of rocky debris over wide areas in the mid-latitudes. These glaciers could be large reservoir of life-supporting water on the planet for simple life forms and for future colonists. Research by John Holt, of the University of Texas at Austin, and others found that one of the features examined is three times larger than the city of Los Angeles and up to 800 m thick, and there are many more.

Some of the glacial-like features were revealed by NASA's Viking orbiters in the 1970s. Since that time glacial-like features have been studied by more and more advanced instruments. Much better data has been received from Mars Global Surveyor, Mars Odyssey, Mars Express, and Mars Reconnaissance Orbiter.

== Gallery ==
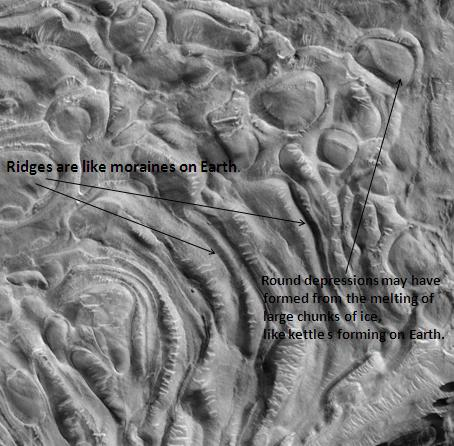
Moreux Crater moraines and kettle holes, as seen by HIRISE. Location is Ismenius Lacus quadrangle.

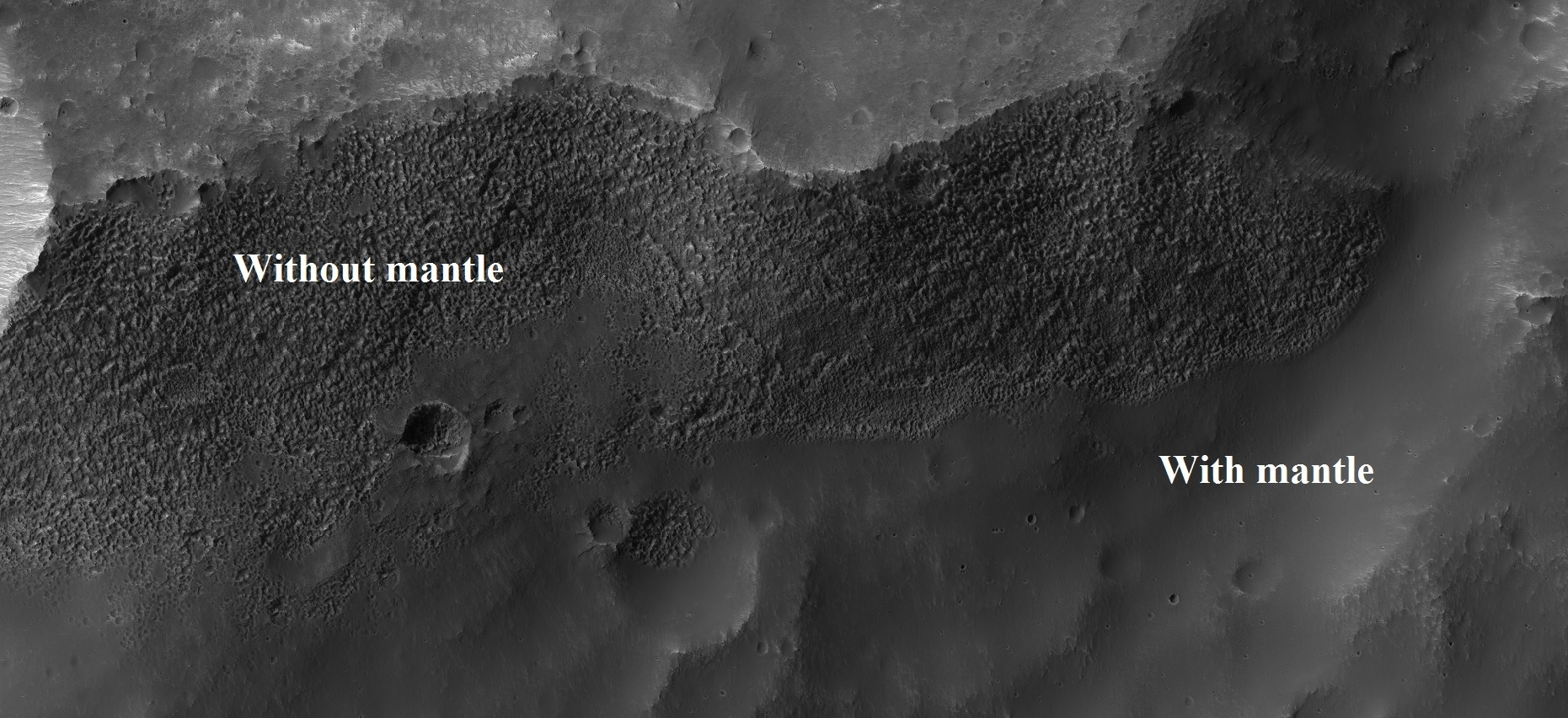
Surface showing appearance with and without mantle covering, as seen by HiRISE, under the HiWish program. Location is Terra Sirenum in Phaethontis quadrangle. Mantle fell from the sky and may be a major source of ice for glaciers.

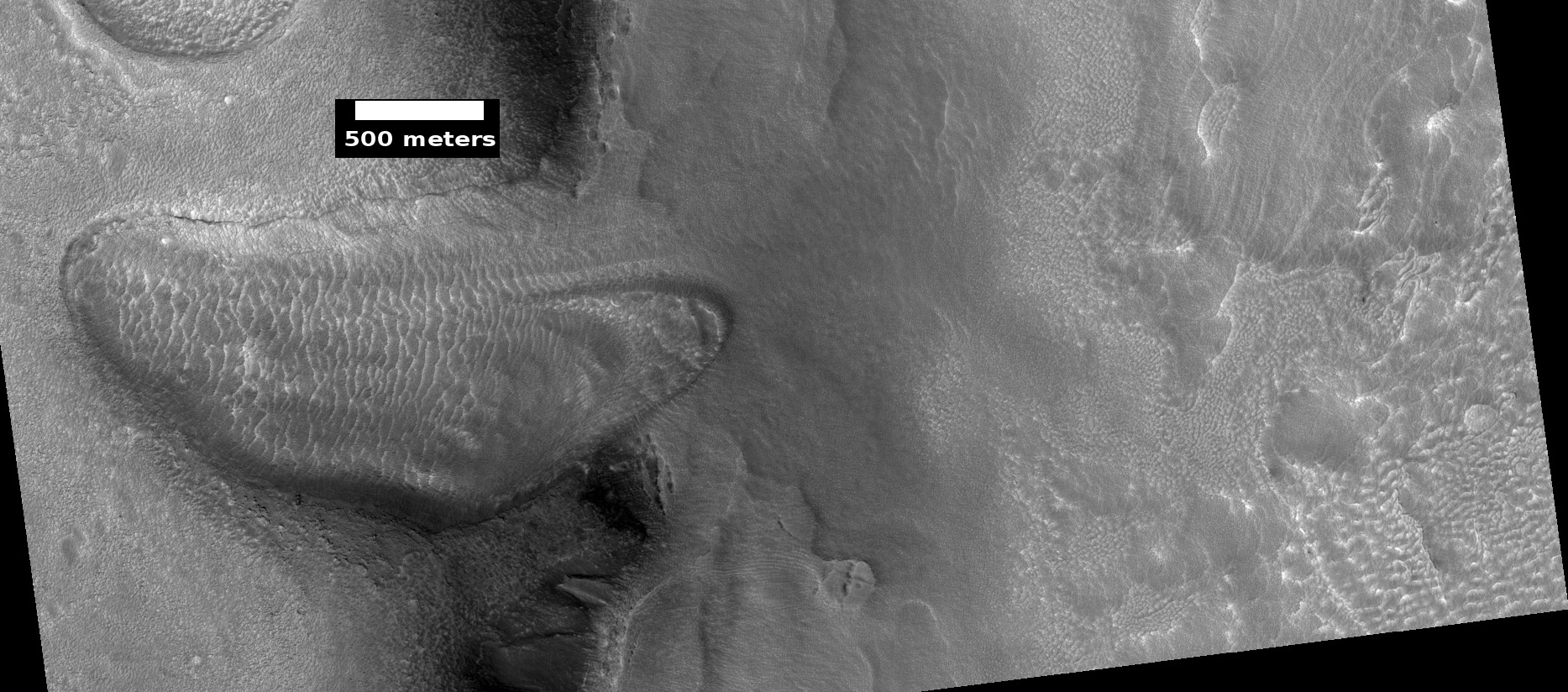
Glacier moving out of valley, as seen by HiRISE under HiWish program Location is Ismenius Lacus quadrangle.

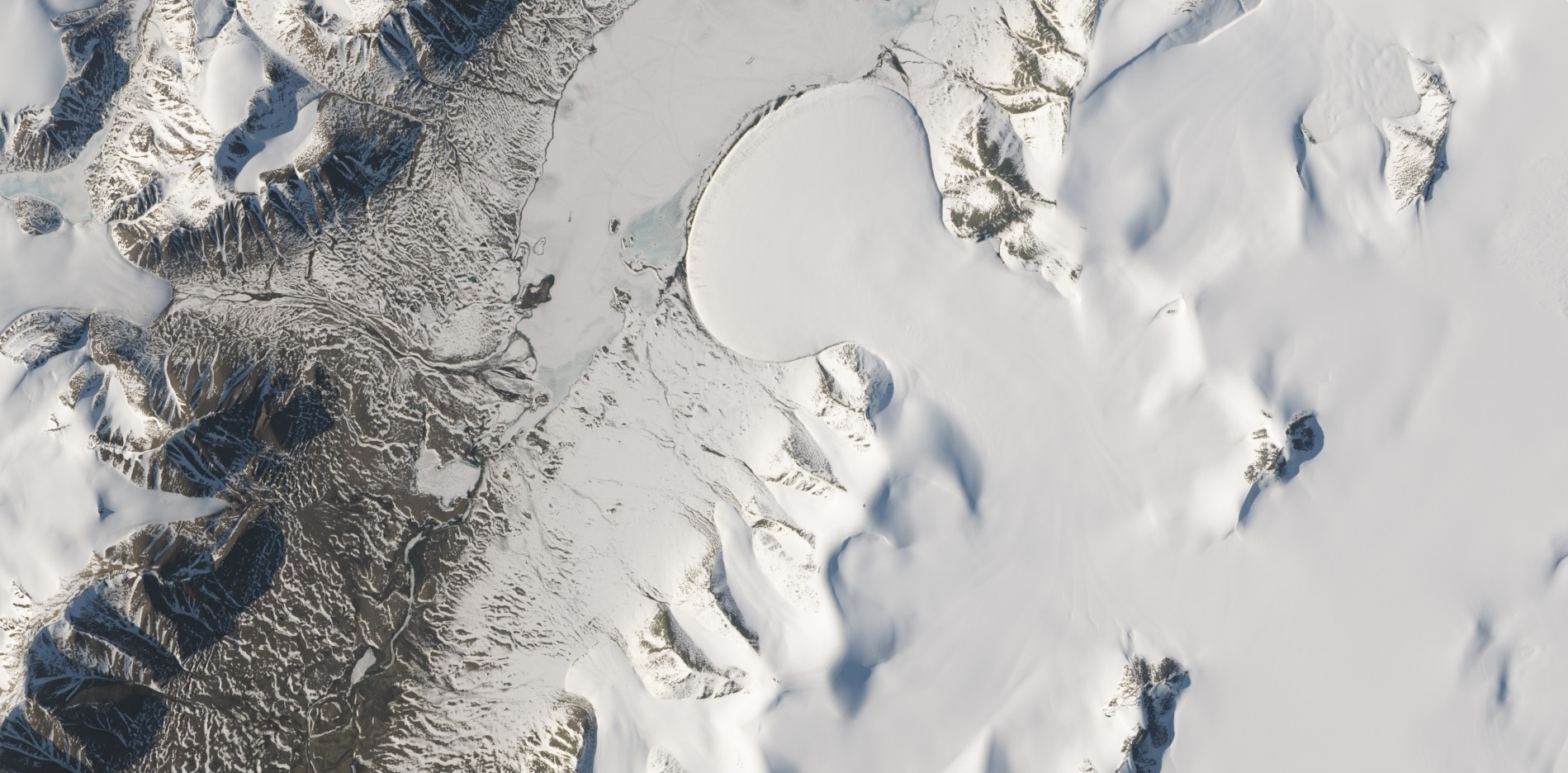
Romer Lake's Elephant Foot Glacier in the Earth's Arctic, as seen by Landsat 8. This picture shows several glaciers that have the same shape as many features on Mars that are believed to also be glaciers.

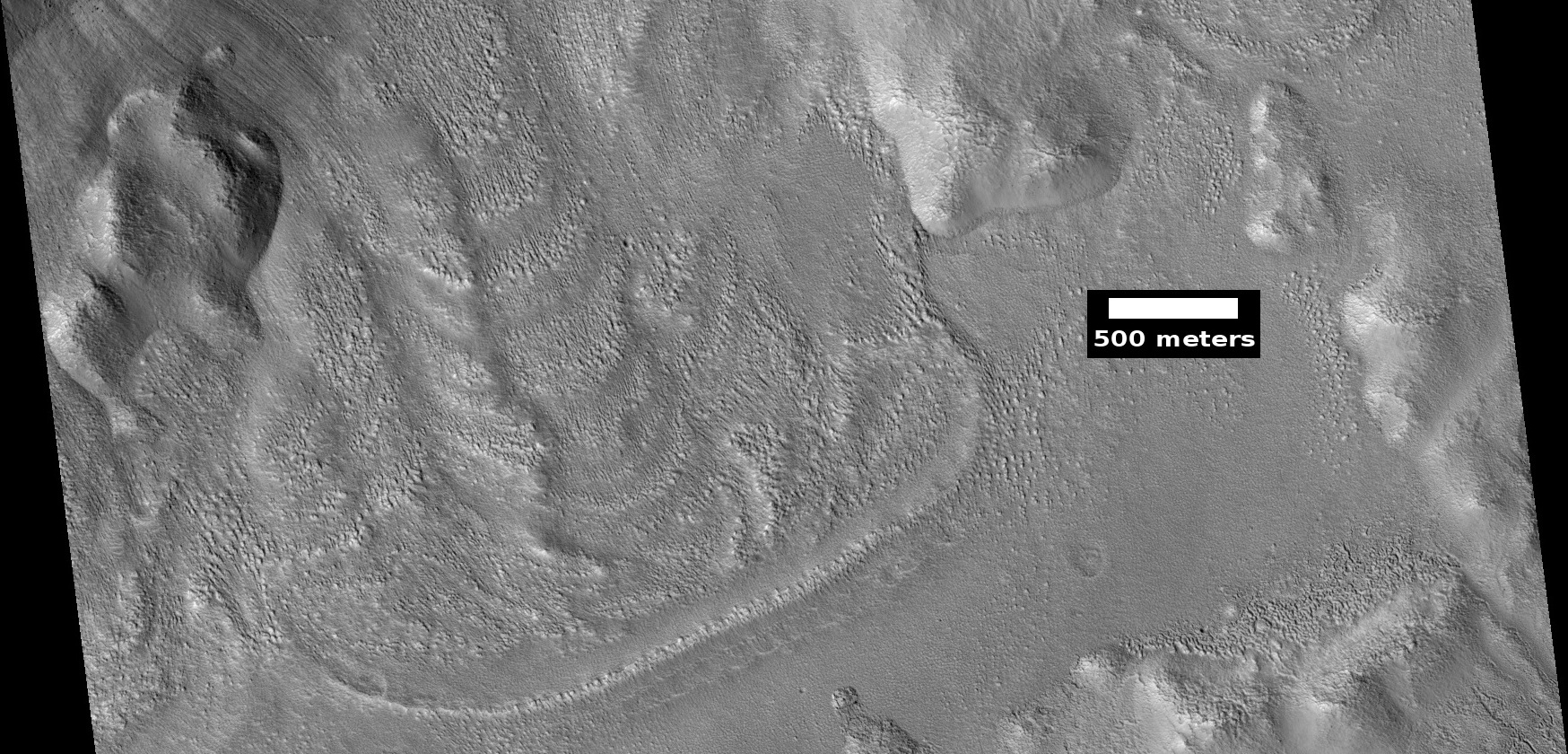
Glacier coming out of valley, as seen by HiRISE under HiWish program Location is rim of Moreux Crater. Location is Ismenius Lacus quadrangle.

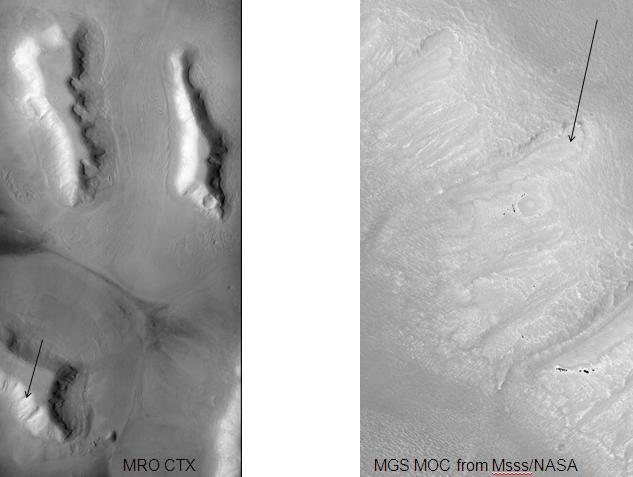
The arrow in the left picture points to a possibly valley carved by a glacier. The image on the right shows the valley greatly enlarged in a Mars Global Surveyor image.

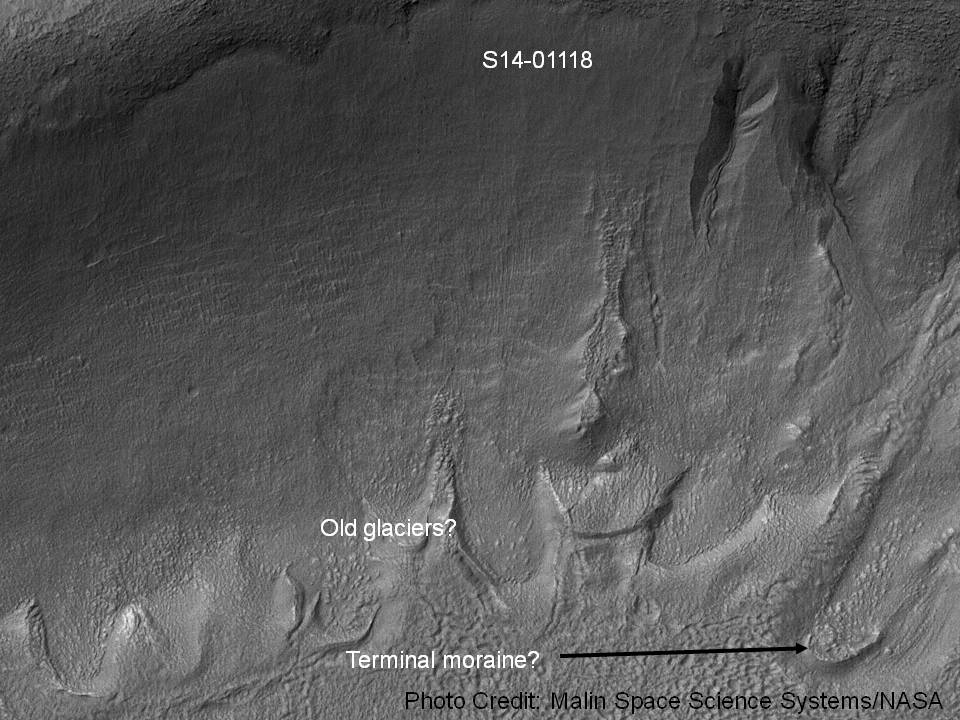
Gullies and possible remains of old glaciers in a crater in Eridania quadrangle, north of the large crater Kepler. One suspected glacier, to the right, has the shape of a tongue. Image was taken by the Mars Global Surveyor under the Public Target program.

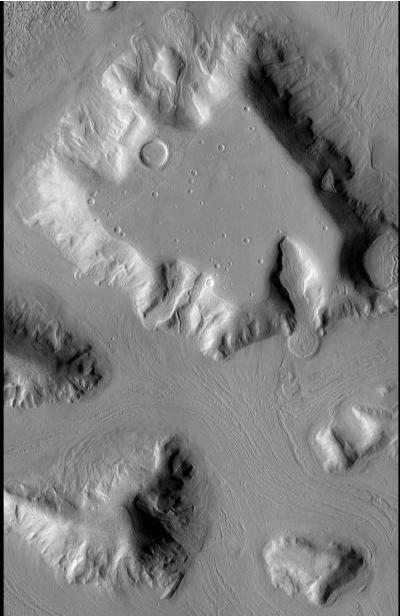
Mesa in Ismenius Lacus quadrangle, as seen by CTX. Mesa has several glaciers eroding it. One of the glaciers is seen in greater detail in the next two images from HiRISE. Image from Ismenius Lacus quadrangle.

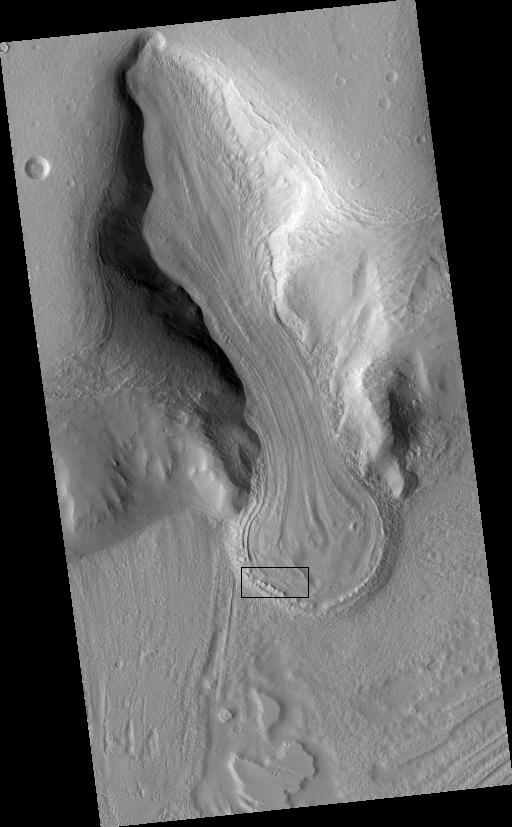
Glacier as seen by HiRISE under the HiWish program. Area in rectangle is enlarged in the next photo. Zone of accumulation of snow at the top. Glacier is moving down valley, then spreading out on plain. Evidence for flow comes from the many lines on surface. Location is in Protonilus Mensae in Ismenius Lacus quadrangle.

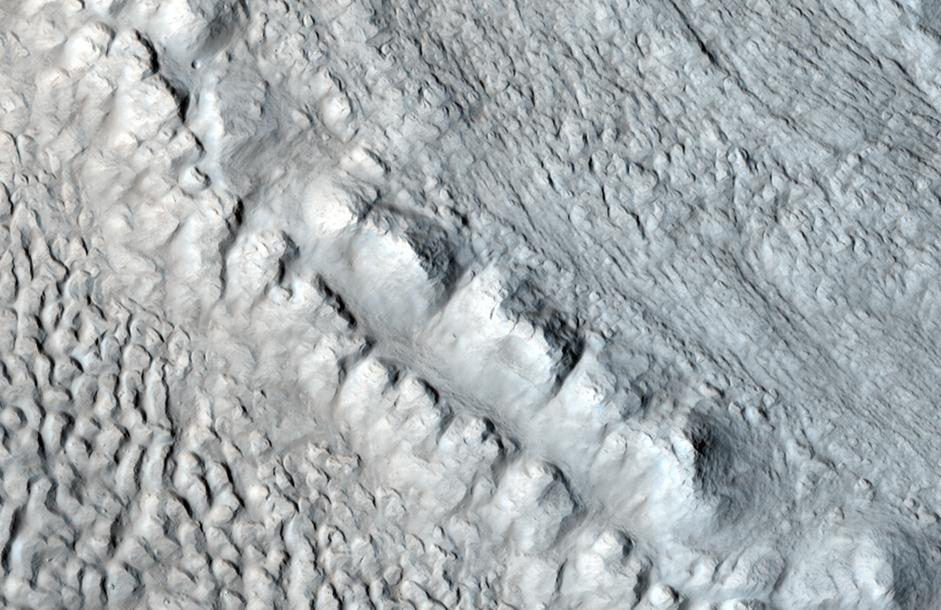
Enlargement of area in rectangle of the previous image. Interpreted as the terminal moraine of a glacier. Picture taken with HiRISE under the HiWish program. Image from Ismenius Lacus quadrangle.

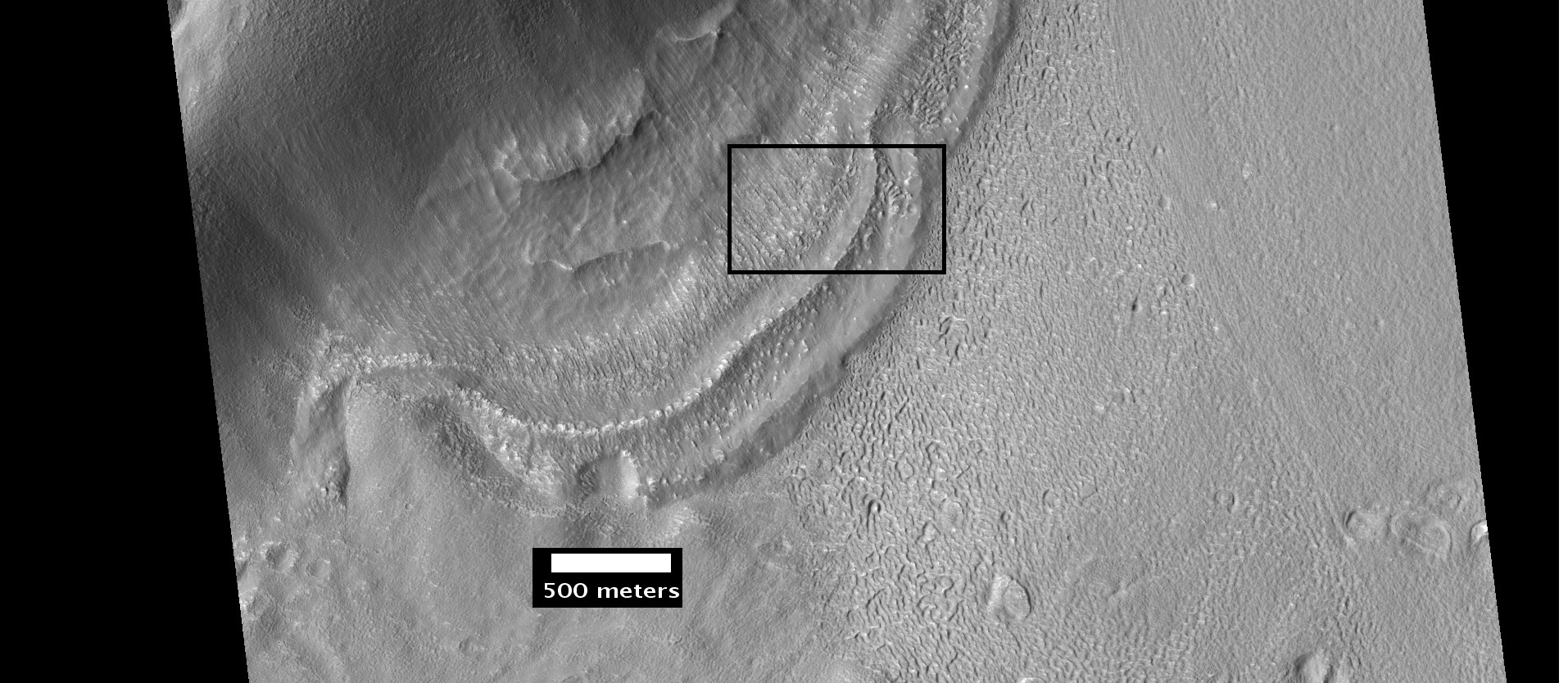
Context for the next image of the end of a flow feature or glacier. Location is Hellas quadrangle. Picture taken with HiRISE under the HiWish program.

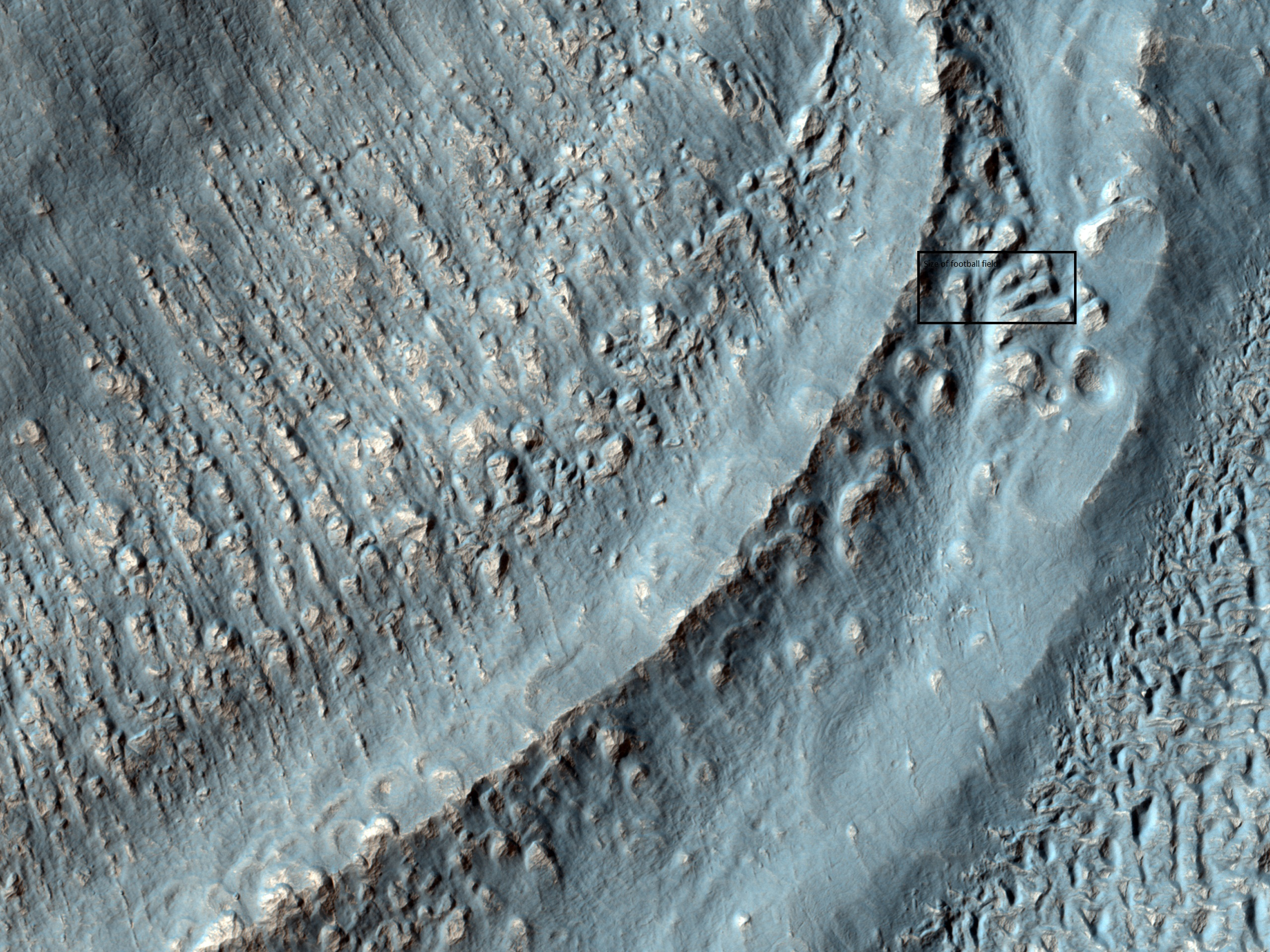
Close-up of the area in the box in the previous image. Interpreted as the terminal moraine of a glacier. For scale, the box shows the approximate size of a football field. Image taken with HiRISE under the HiWish program. Location is Hellas quadrangle.

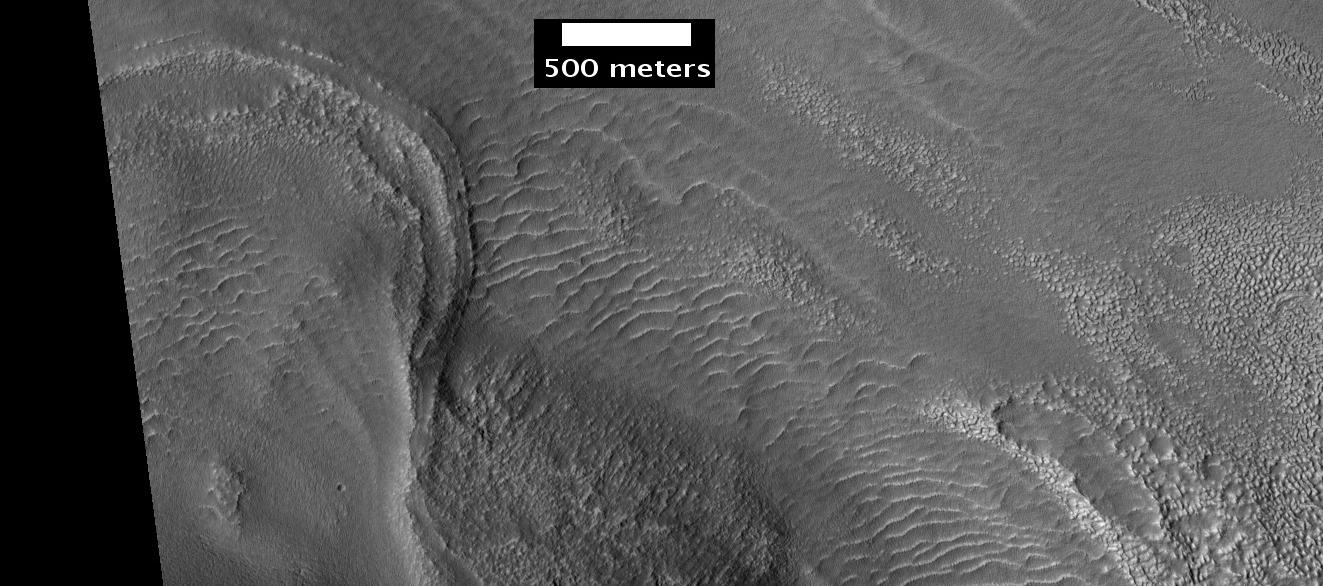
Possible moraine on the end of a past glacier on a mound in Deuteronilus Mensae, as seen by HiRISE, under the HiWish program.

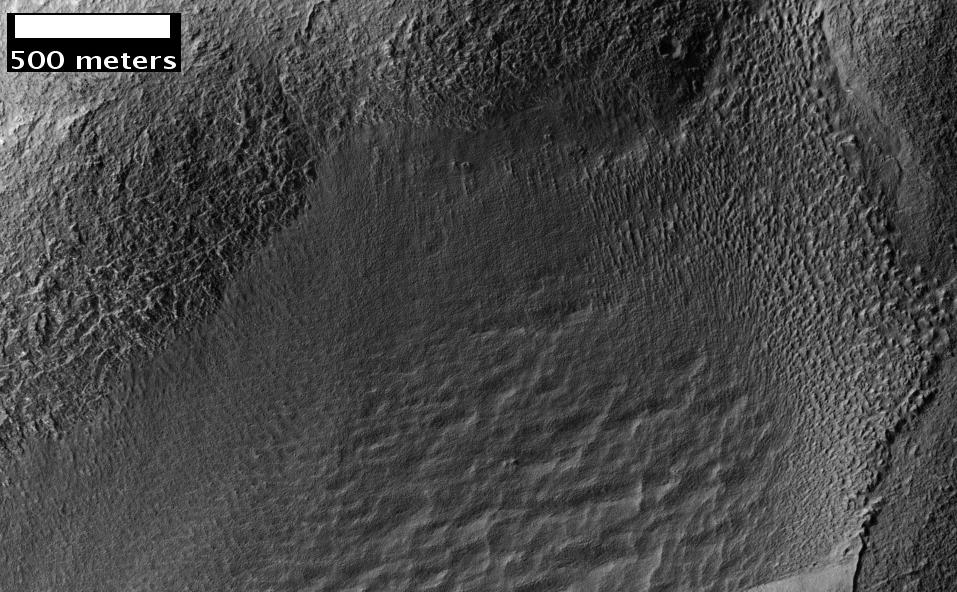
Possible Glacial Cirque in Hellas Planitia, as seen by HiRISE, under the HiWish program. Lines are probably due to downhill movement.

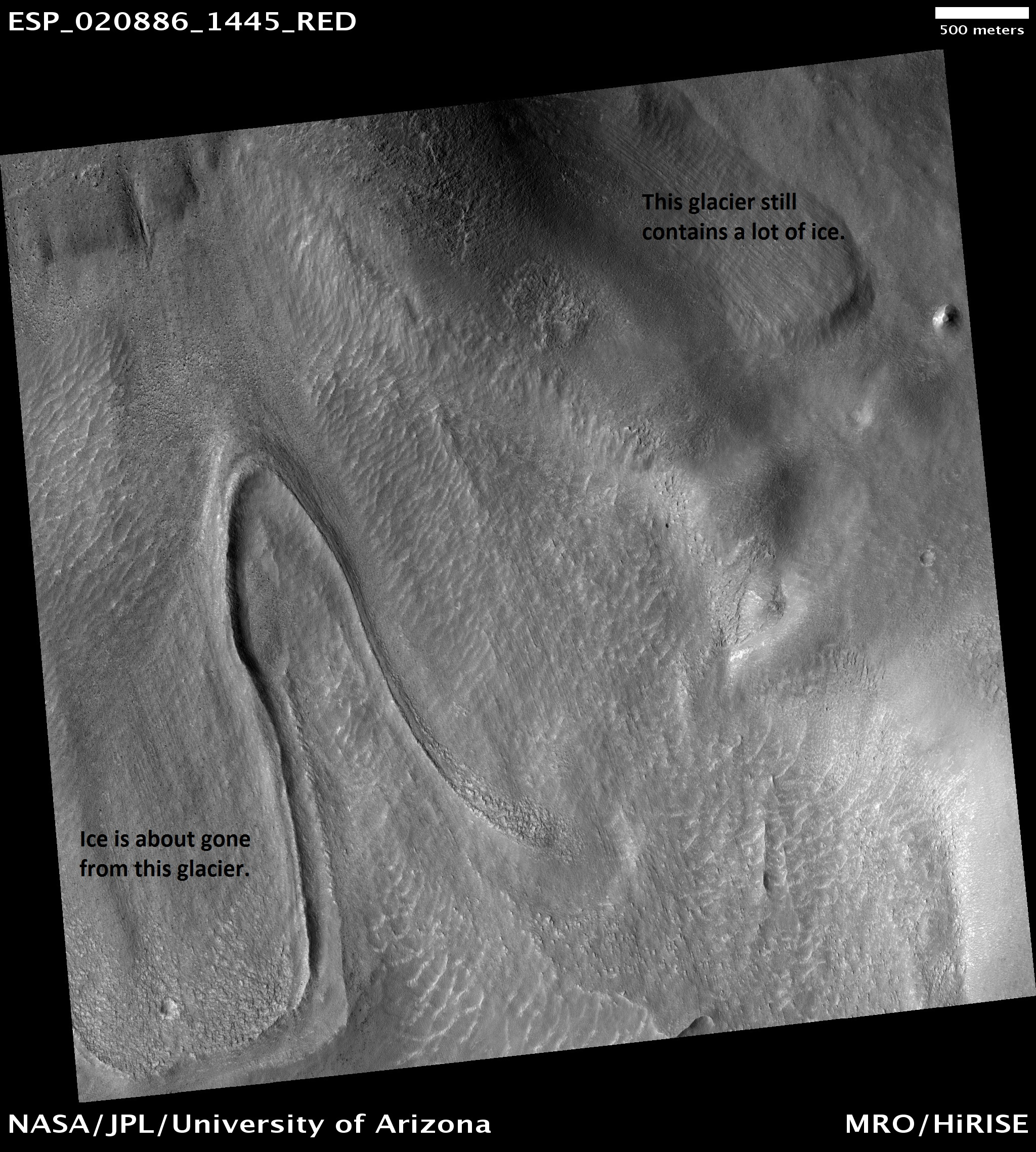
Glaciers, as seen by HiRISE, under HiWish program. Glacier on left is thin because it has lost much of its ice. Glacier on the right on the other hand is thick; it still contains a lot of ice that is under a thin layer of dirt and rock. Location is Hellas quadrangle.

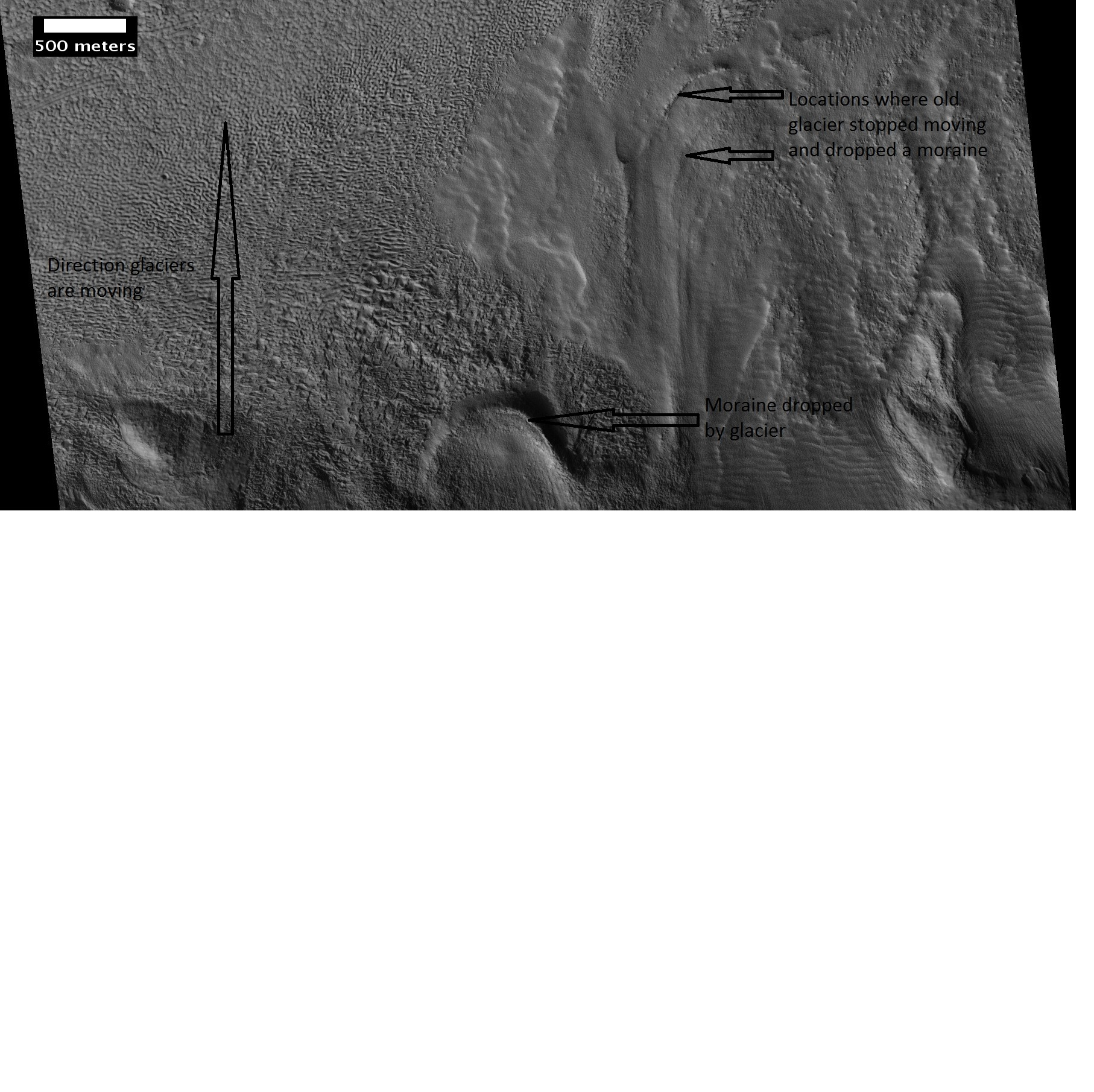
Remains of glaciers, as seen by HiRISE under the HiWish program. Image from Ismenius Lacus quadrangle.

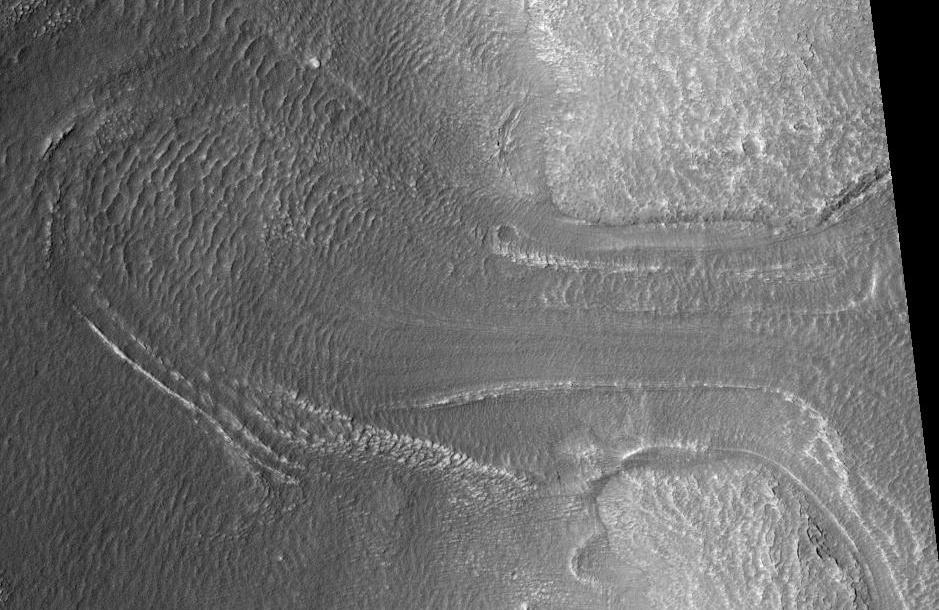
Probable glacier as seen by HiRISE under HiWish program. Radar studies have found that it is made up of almost totally of pure ice. It appears to be moving from the high ground (a mesa) on the right. Location is Ismenius Lacus quadrangle.

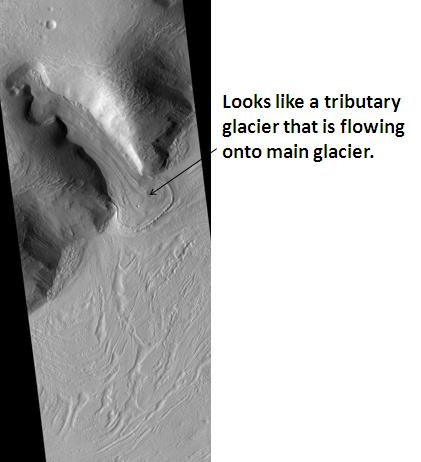
Tributary Glacier, as seen by HiRISE. Location is Ismenius Lacus quadrangle.

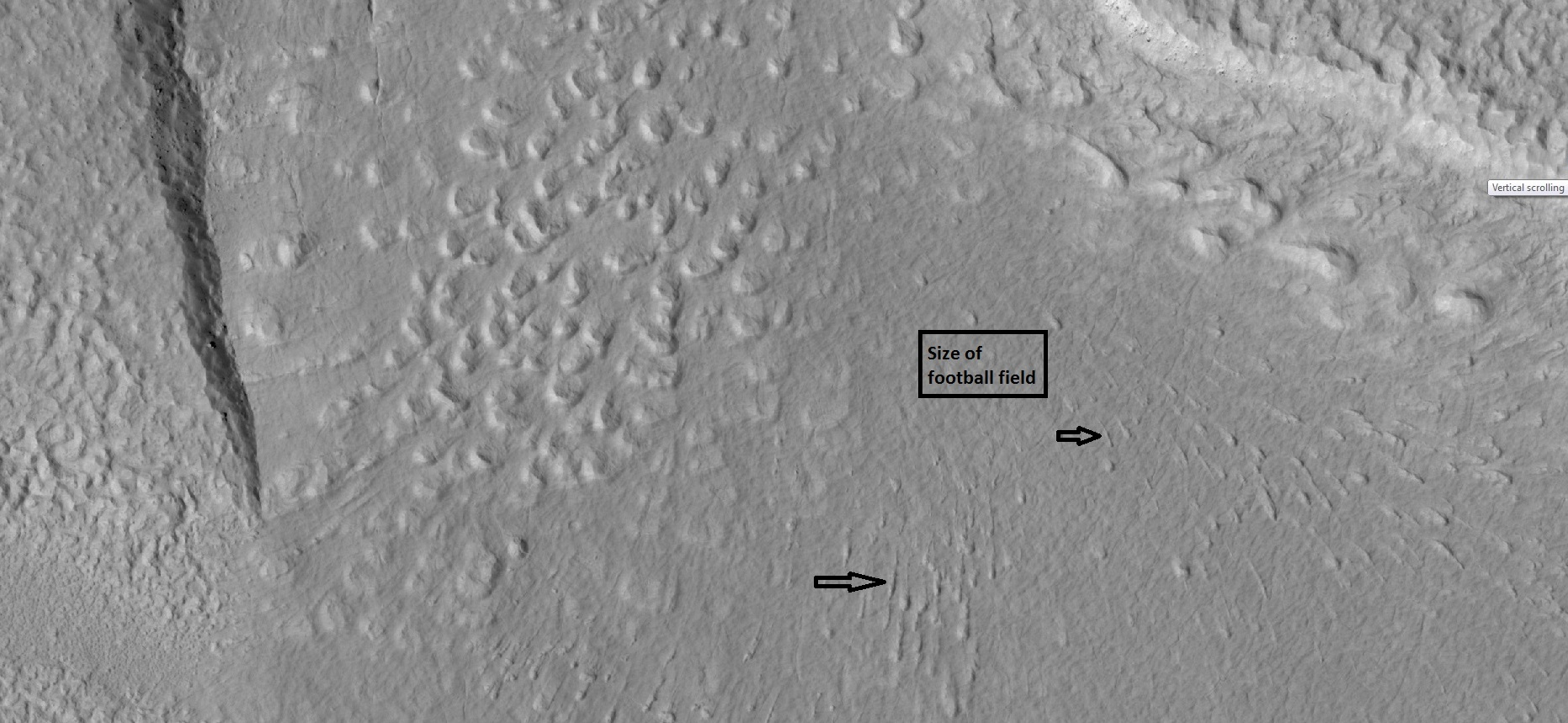
Arrows point to drumlin-like shapes that were probably formed under a glacier, as seen by HiRISE, under HiWish program. Some of the shapes require liquid water under the glacier to form. Location is Ismenius Lacus quadrangle.

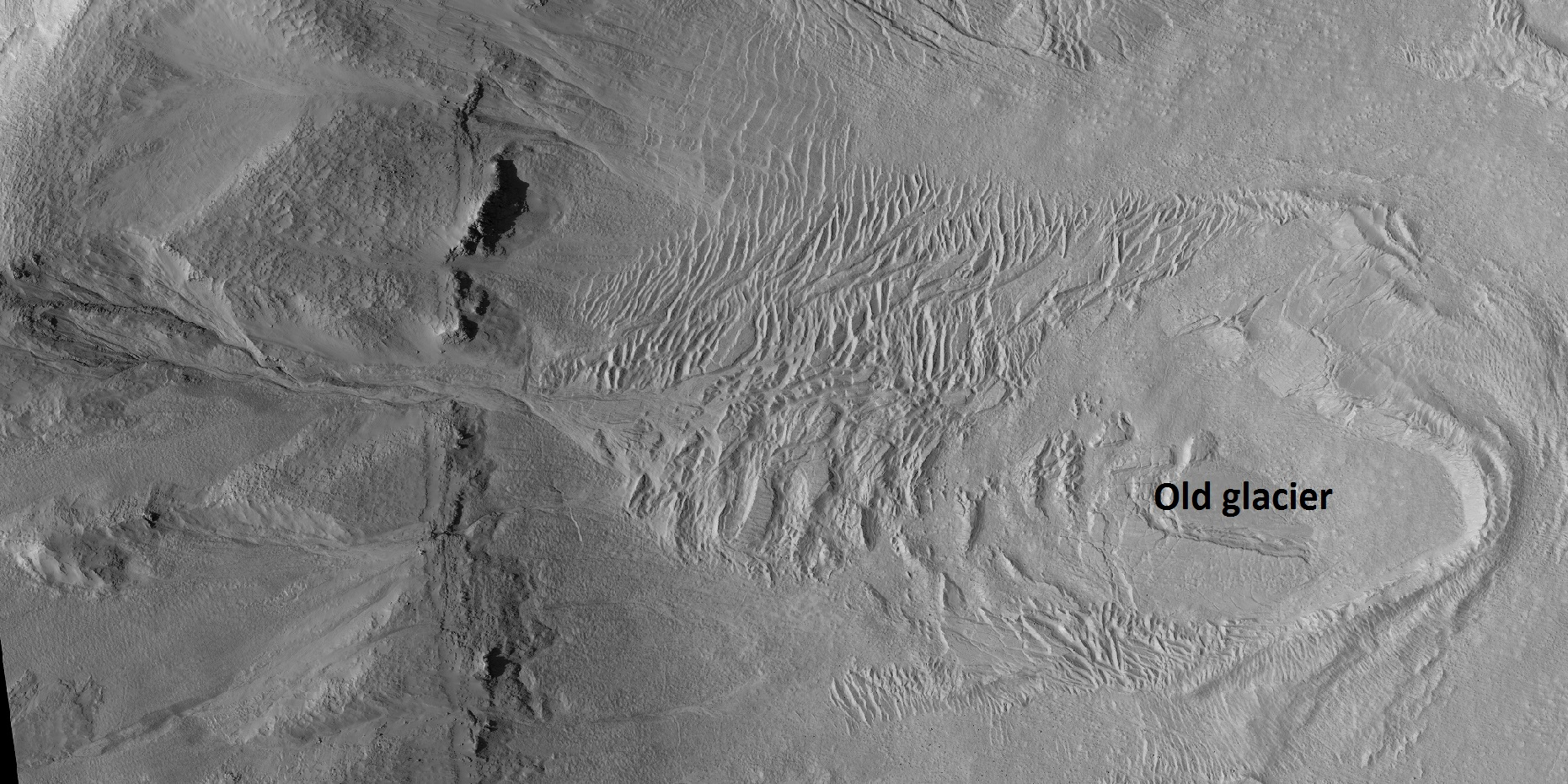
Glacier on a crater floor, as seen by HiRISE under HiWish program The cracks in the glacier may be crevasses. There is also a gully system on the crater wall. Location is Casius quadrangle.

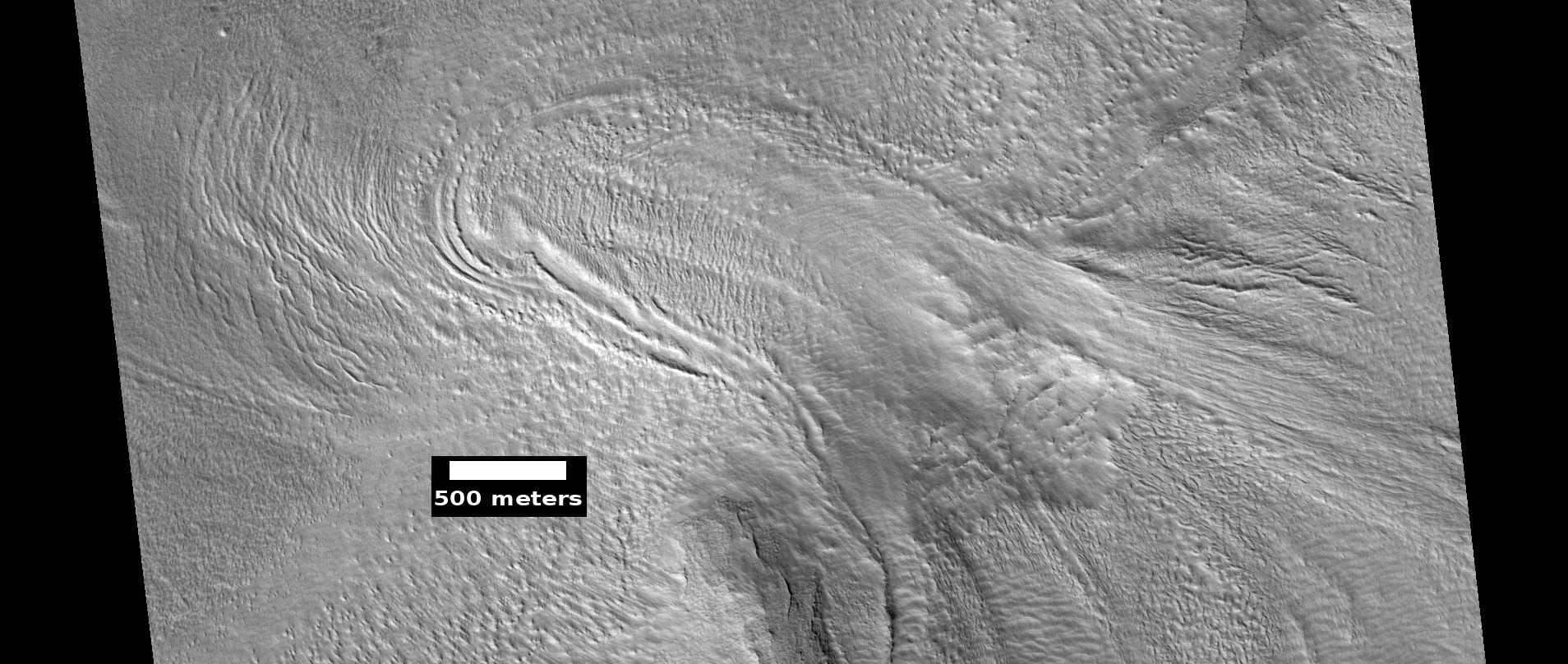
Glacier, as seen by HiRISE under HiWish program Location is Casius quadrangle.

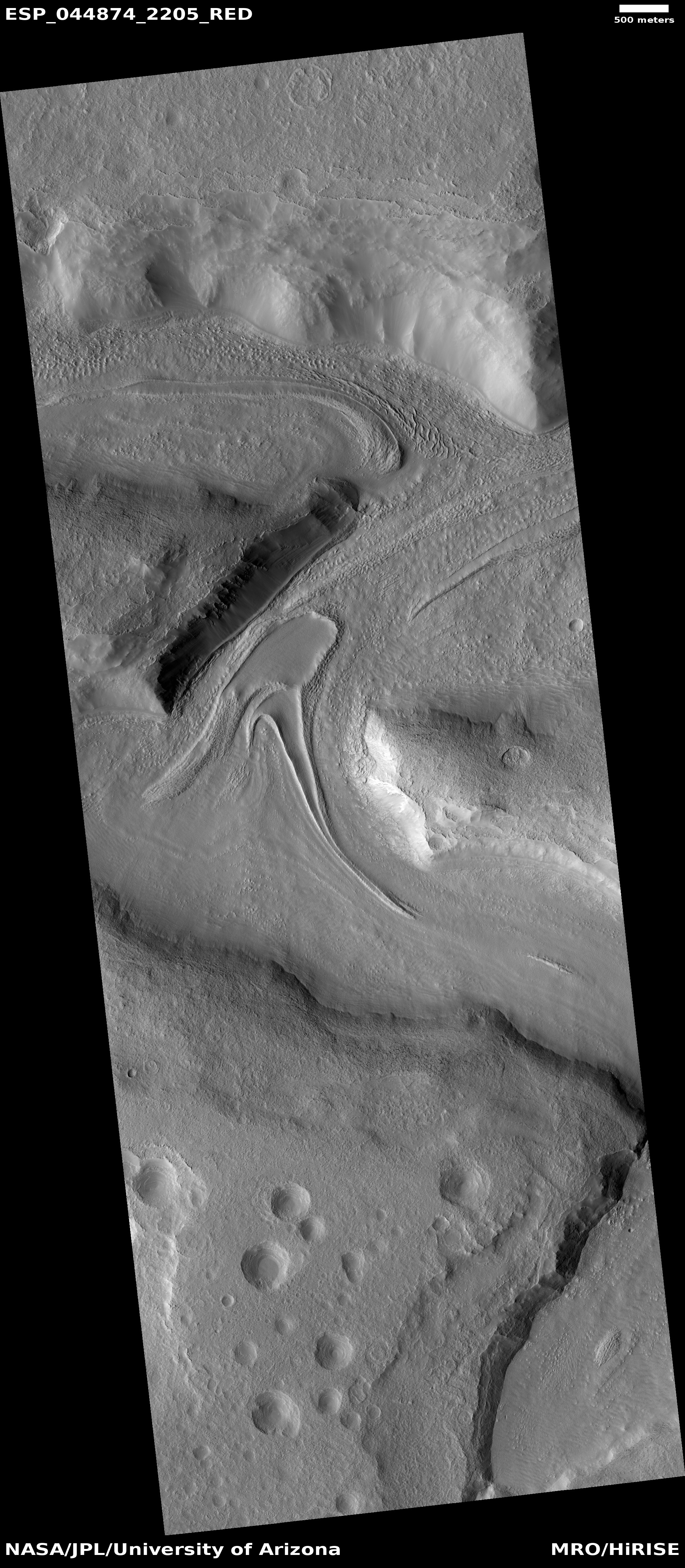
Glaciers moving in two different valleys, as seen by HiRISE under HiWish program Location is Ismenius Lacus quadrangle.

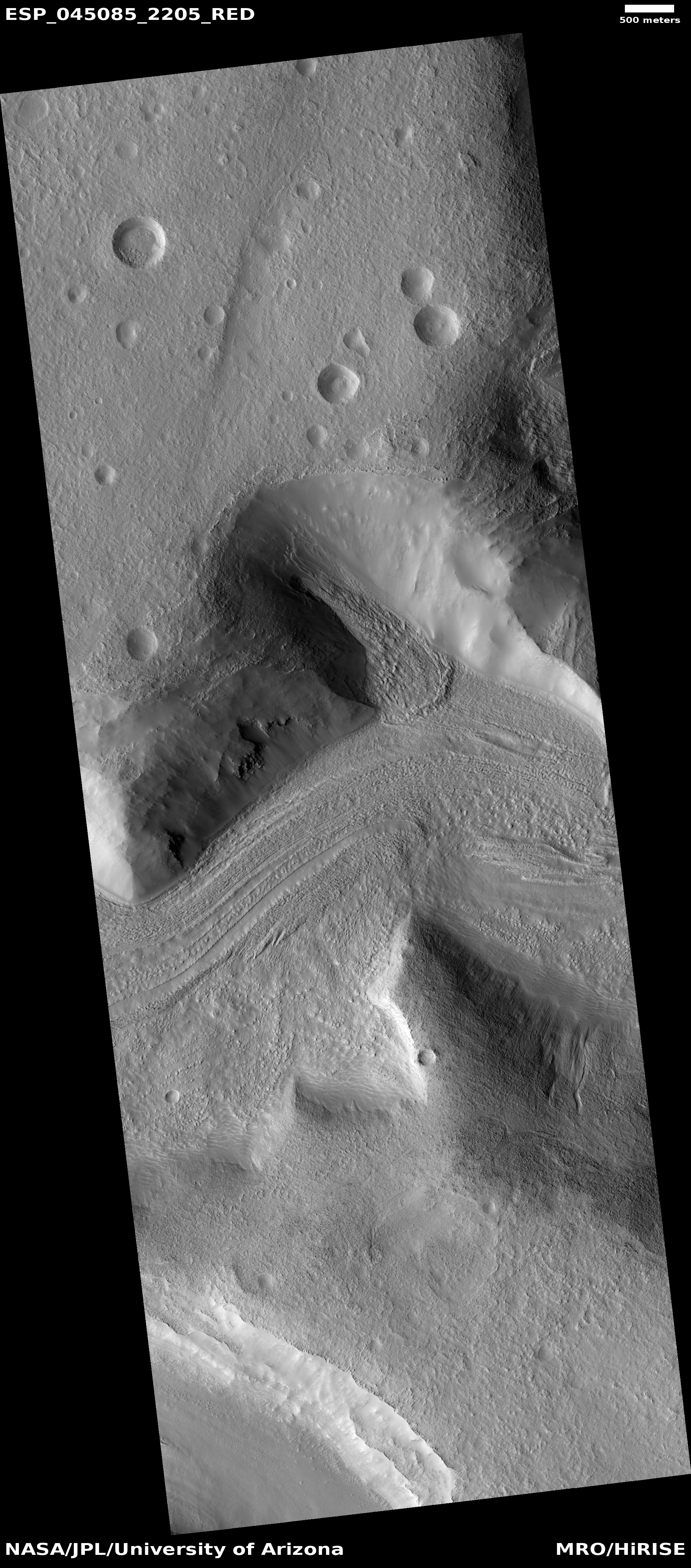
Wide view of flow moving down valley, as seen by HiRISE under HiWish program Location is Ismenius Lacus quadrangle.

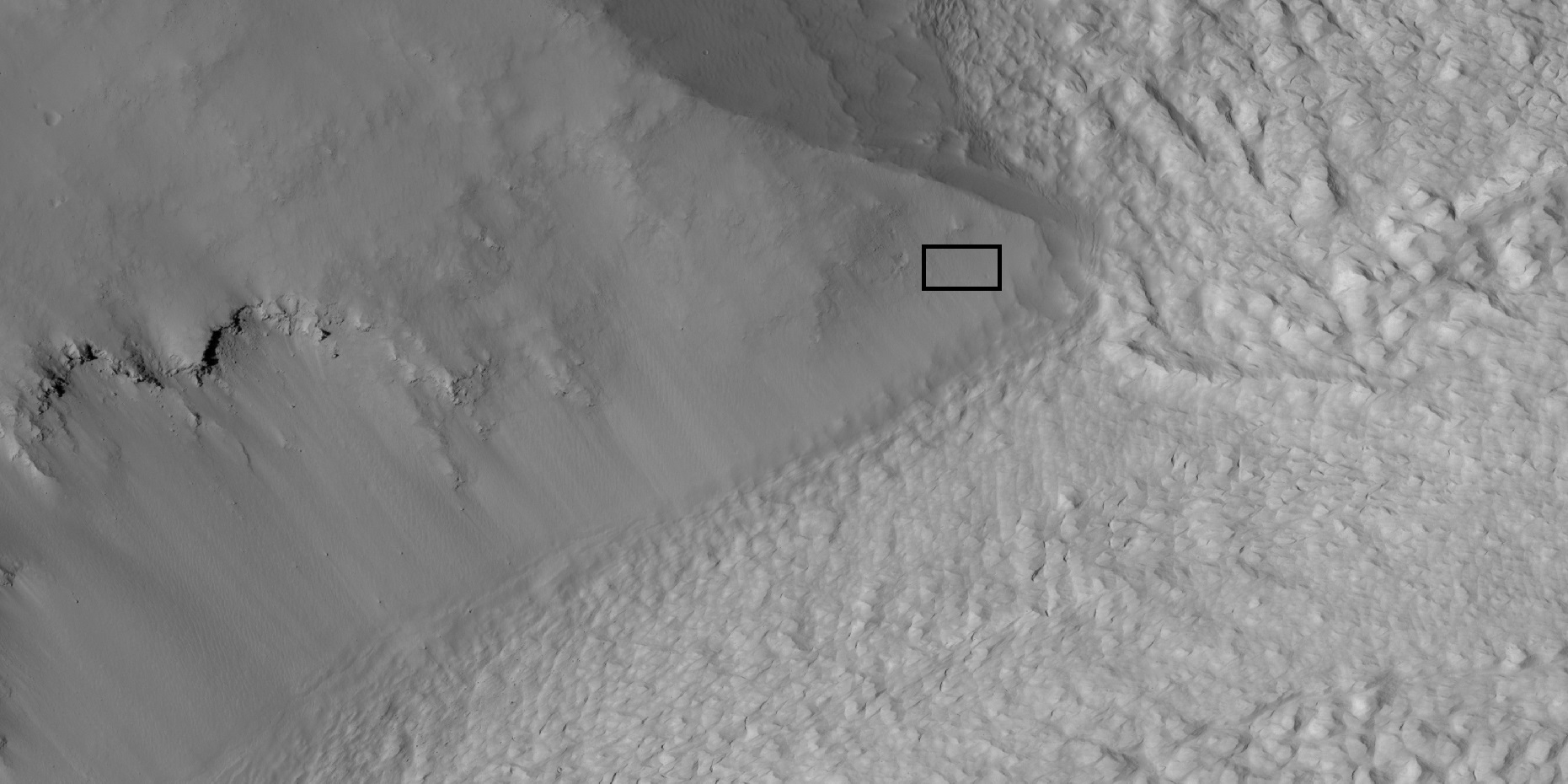
Close view of part of glacier, as seen by HiRISE under HiWish program Box shows size of football field. Location is Ismenius Lacus quadrangle.

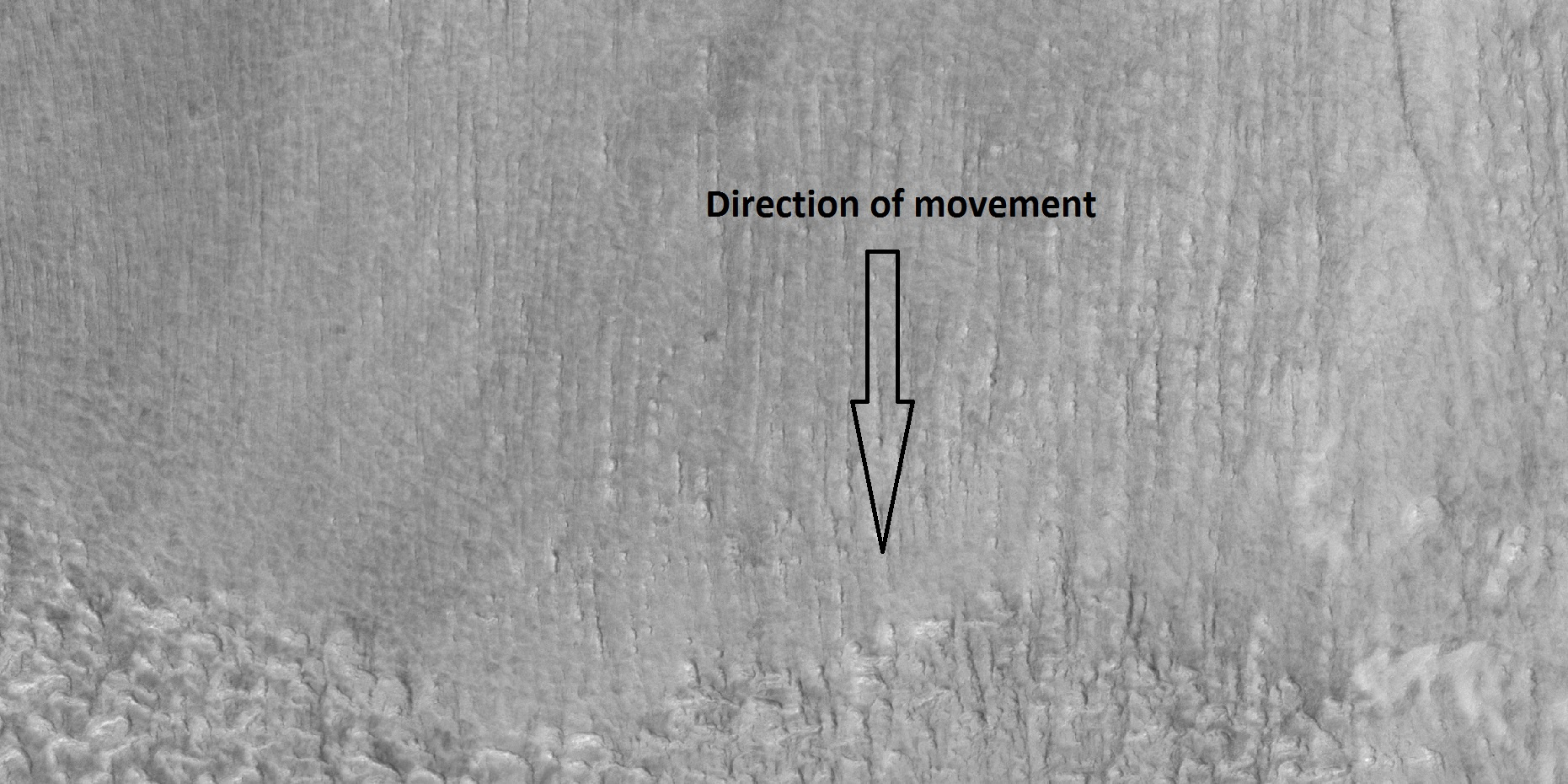
Grooves caused by movement of glacier, as seen by HiRISE under HiWish program

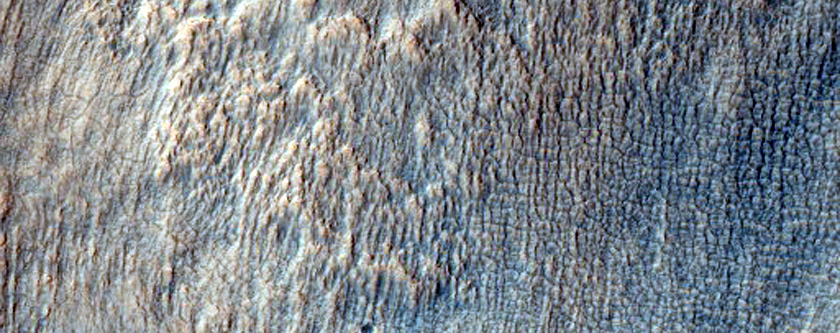
Close, color view of polygons, as seen by HiRISE under HiWish program Polygons are common in ice-rich ground.

== See also ==
- Areography (geography of Mars)
- Climate of Mars
- Deuteronilus Mensae
- Dorsa Argentea Formation
- Fretted terrain
- Geology of Mars
- Glacier
- Ismenius Lacus quadrangle
- Lineated valley fill
- Martian dichotomy
- Nilosyrtis Mensae
- Protonilus Mensae
- Tharsis quadrangle
- Water on Mars
