= Brain terrain =

Feature of the Martian surface

Brain terrain, also called knobs-brain coral and brain coral terrain, is a feature of the Martian surface, consisting of complex ridges found on lobate debris aprons, lineated valley fill and concentric crater fill. It is so named because it suggests the ridges on the surface of the human brain. Wide ridges are called closed-cell brain terrain, and the less common narrow ridges are called open-cell brain terrain. It is thought that the wide closed-cell terrain contains a core of ice, and when the ice disappears the center of the wide ridge collapses to produce the narrow ridges of the open-cell brain terrain. Shadow measurements from HiRISE indicate the ridges are 4-5 meters high. Brain terrain has been observed to form from what has been called an "Upper Plains Unit." The process begins with the formation of stress cracks. The upper plains unit fell from the sky as snow and as ice coated dust.

However, not all the details of brain terrain formation has been worked out. Brain terrain remains as one of the unsolved mysteries on Mars.

Today it is widely accepted that glacier-like forms, lobate debris aprons, lineated valley fill, and concentric fill are all related in that they have the same surface texture. Glacier-like forms in valleys and cirque-like alcoves may coalesce with others to produce lobate debris aprons. When opposing lobate debris aprons converge, linear valley fill results. They probably all contain ice-rich material.

Many of these features are found in the Northern hemisphere in parts of a boundary called the Martian dichotomy, mostly between 0 and 70 E longitudes. Near this area are regions that are named from ancient places: Deuteronilus Mensae, Protonilus Mensae, and Nilosyrtis Mensae.

Lobate debris aprons, lineated valley fill, and concentric fill probably have dirt and rock debris covering huge deposits of ice.

== Gallery ==
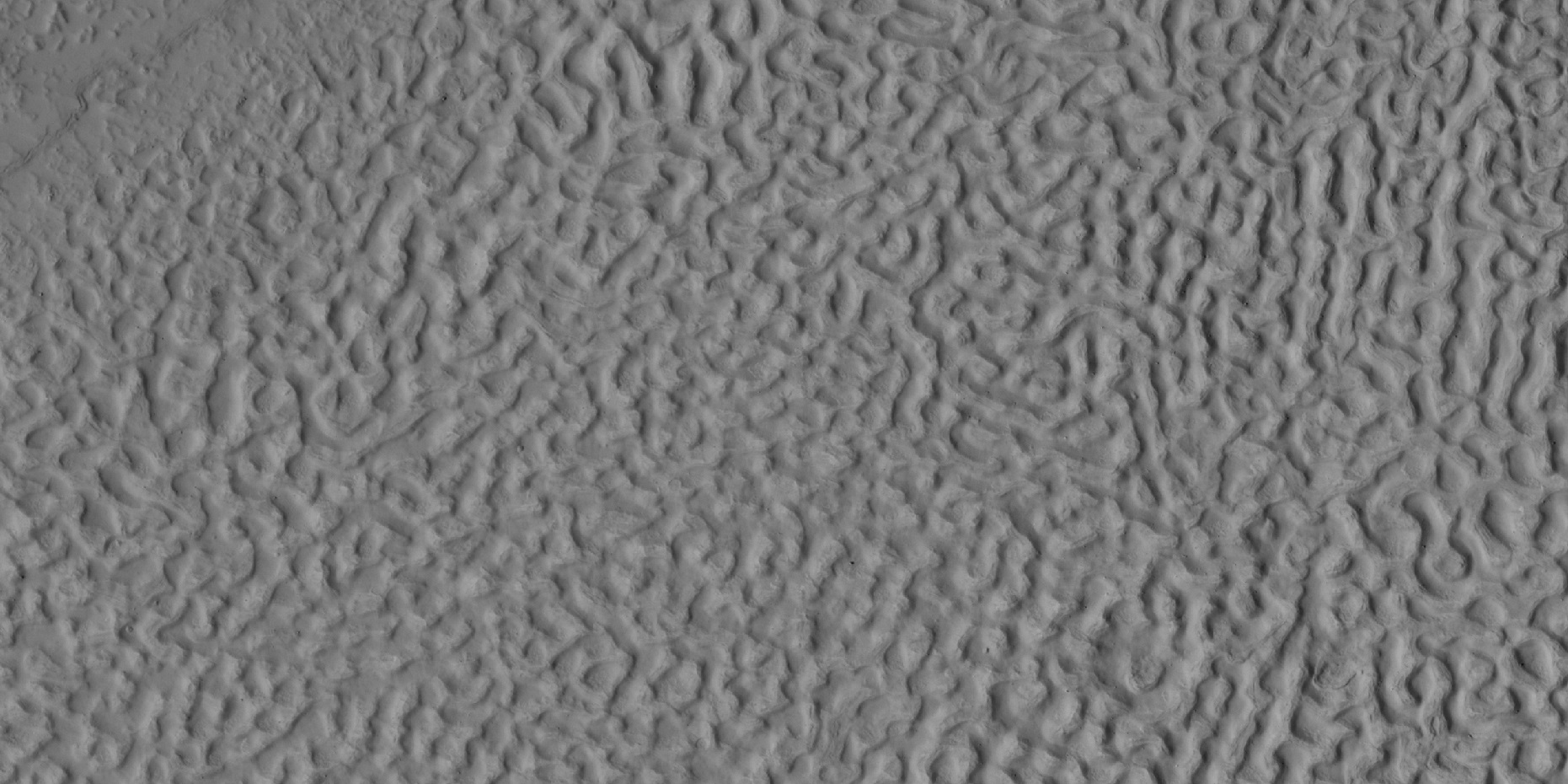
Brain terrain, as seen by HiRISE under HiWish program Location is Ismenius Lacus quadrangle.

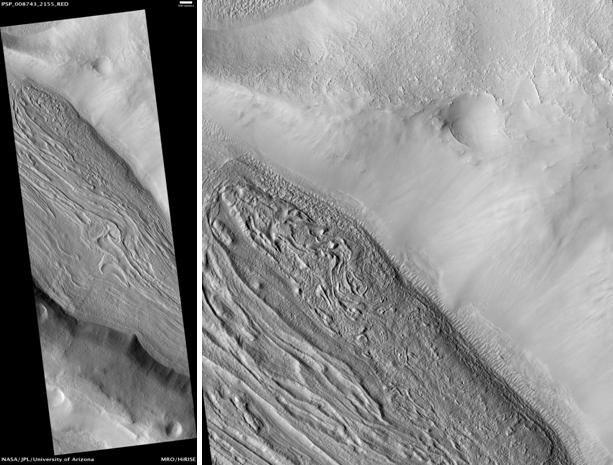
Lineated valley fill in Coloe Fossae, as seen by HiRISE. Scale bar is 500 meters long. Location is Ismenius Lacus quadrangle.

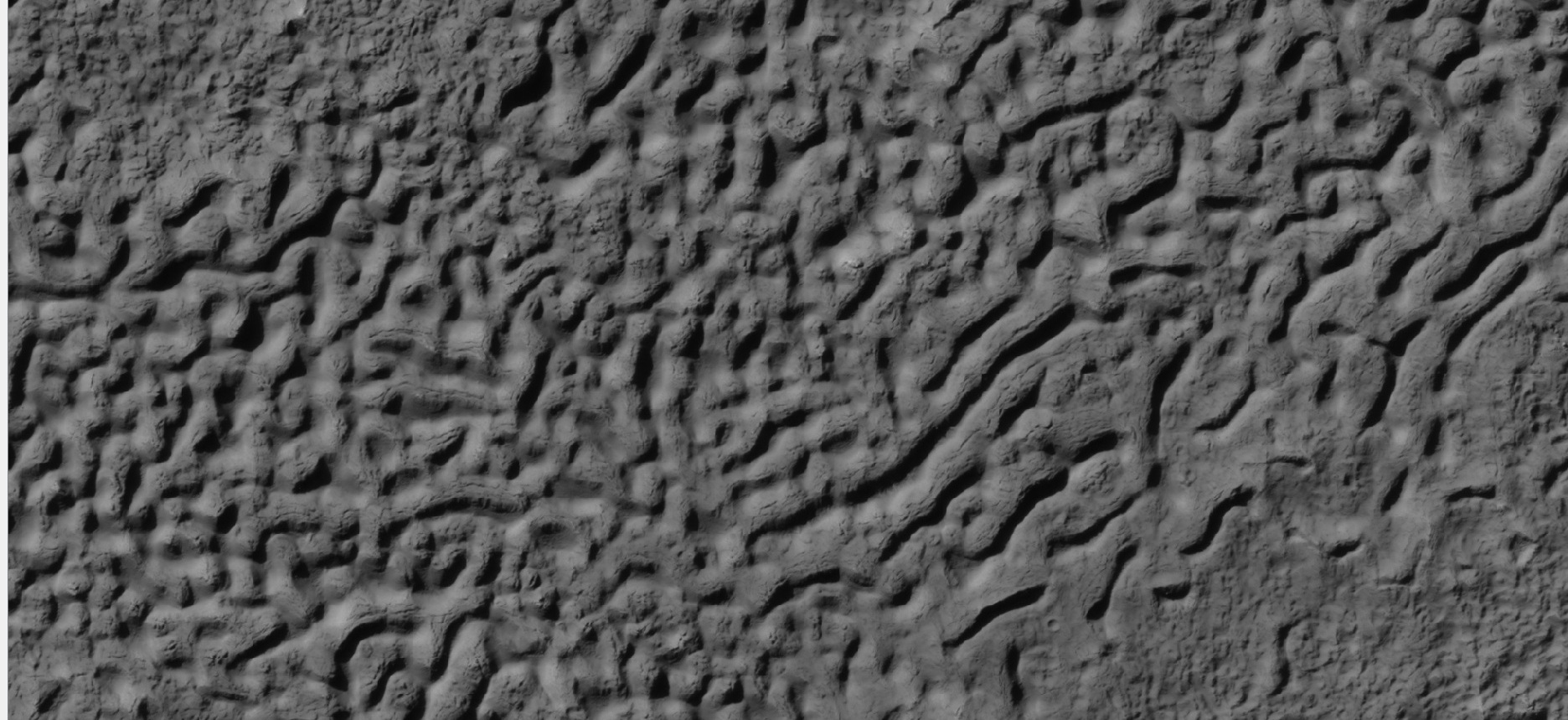
Closed-cell brain terrain, as seen by HiRISE under the HiWish program. This type of surface is common on lobate debris aprons, concentric crater fill, and lineated valley fill.

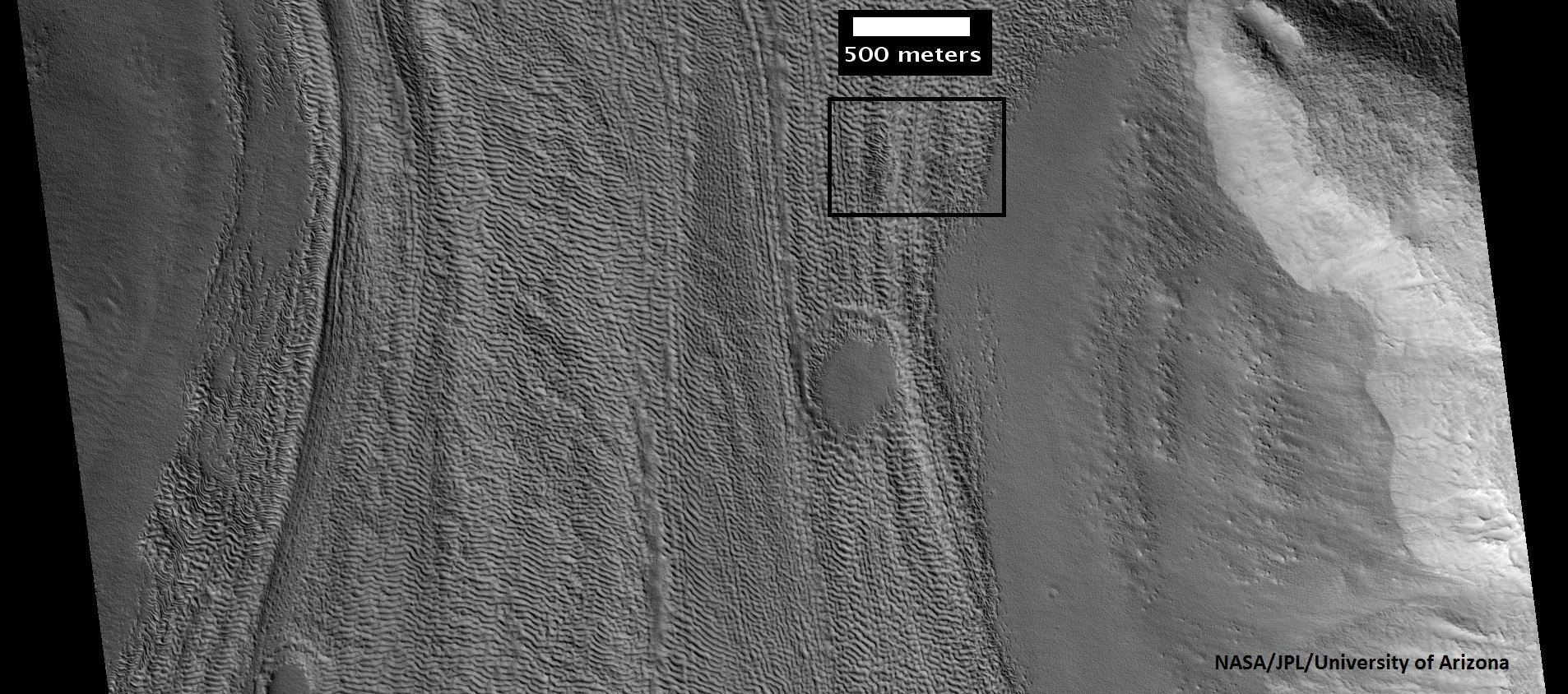
Context picture showing origin of next picture. The location is a region of lineated valley fill. Image from HiRISE under HiWish program.

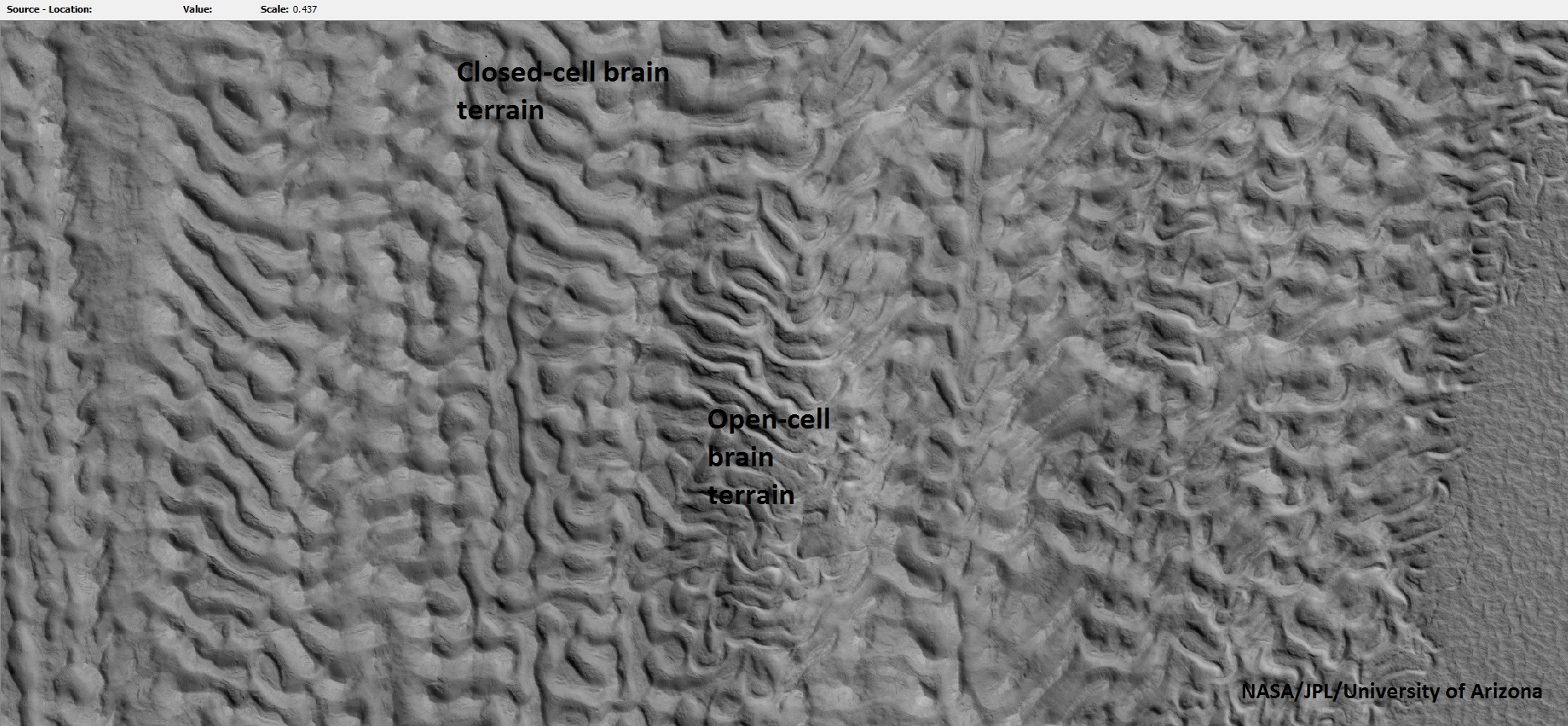
Open and closed-cell brain terrain, as seen by HiRISE, under HiWish program.

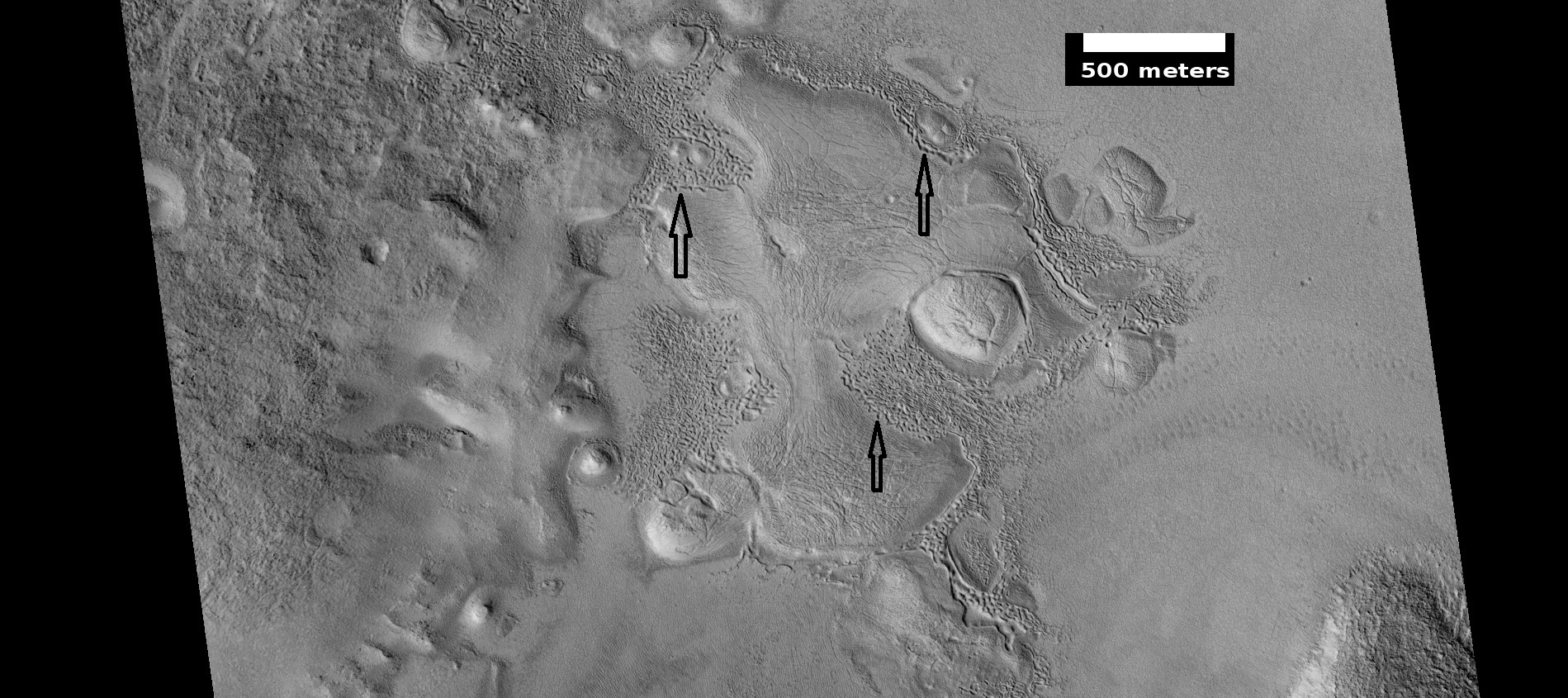
Brain terrain being formed from a thicker layer, as seen by HiRISE under HiWish program. Arrows show the thicker unit breaking up into small cells.

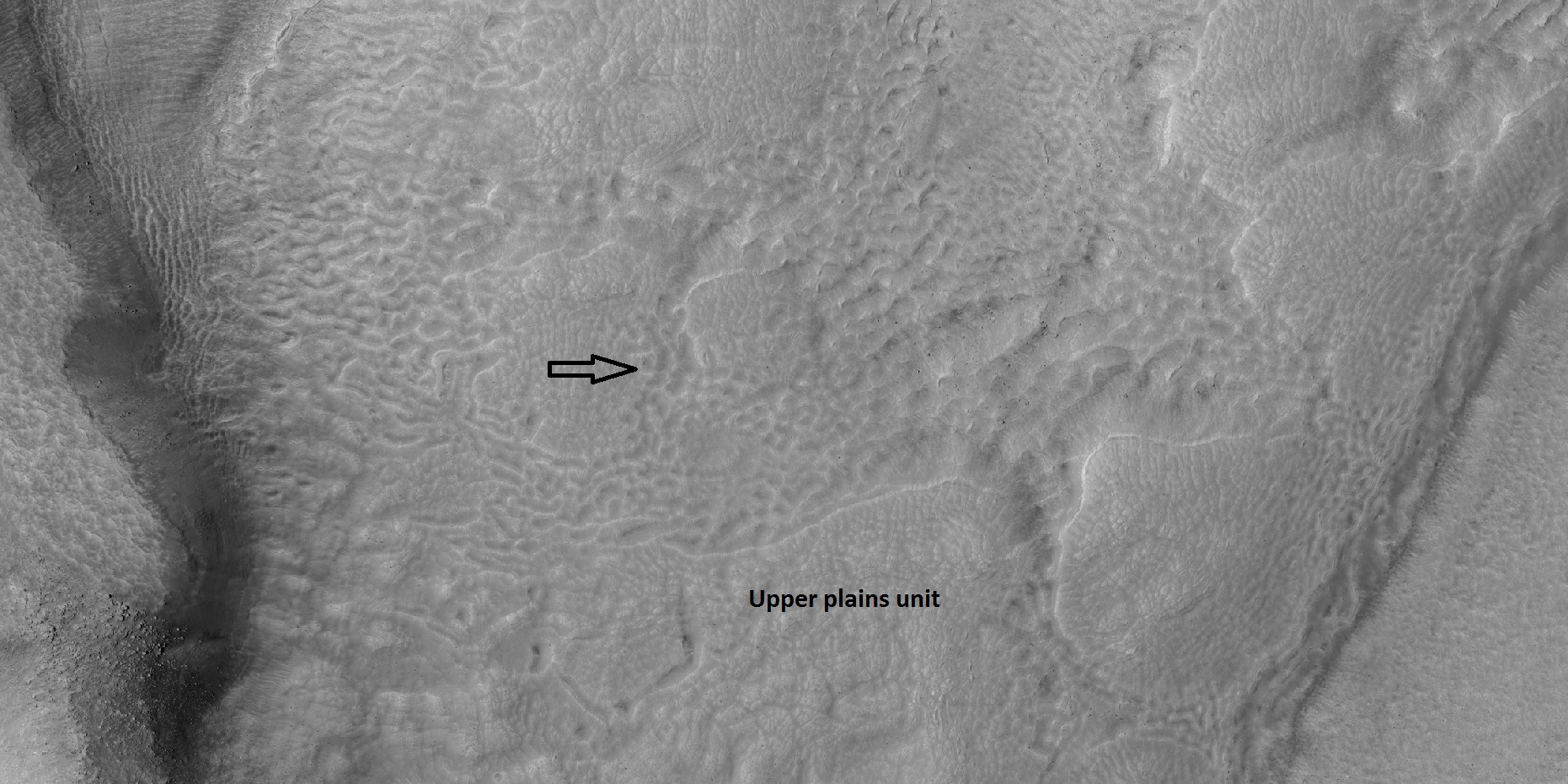
Brain terrain is forming from the breakdown of upper plains unit, as seen by HiRISE under HiWish program Arrow points to a place where fractures are forming that will turn into brain terrain.

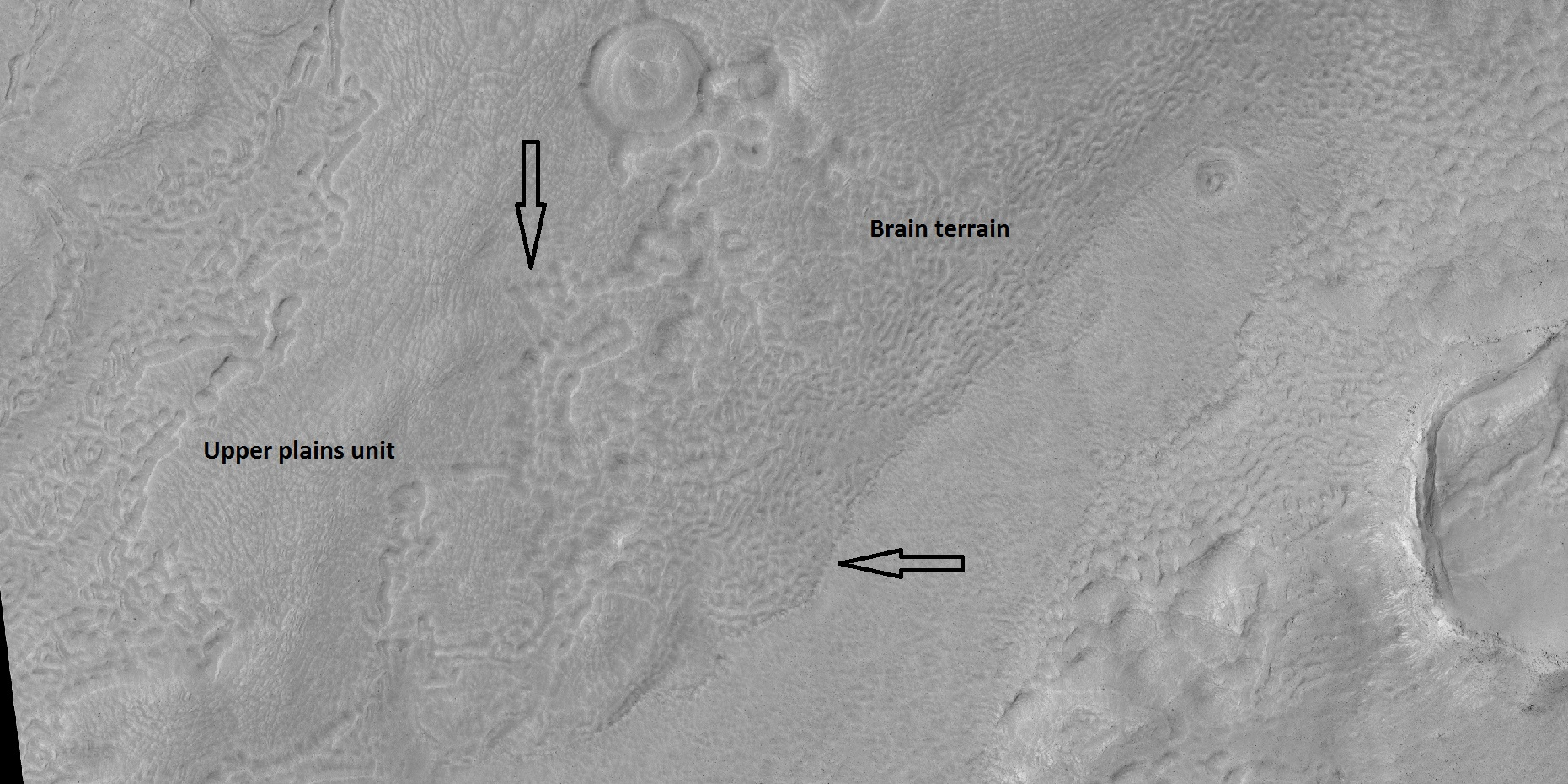
Brain terrain is forming from the breakdown of upper plains unit, as seen by HiRISE under HiWish program Arrow points to a place where fractures are forming that will turn into brain terrain.

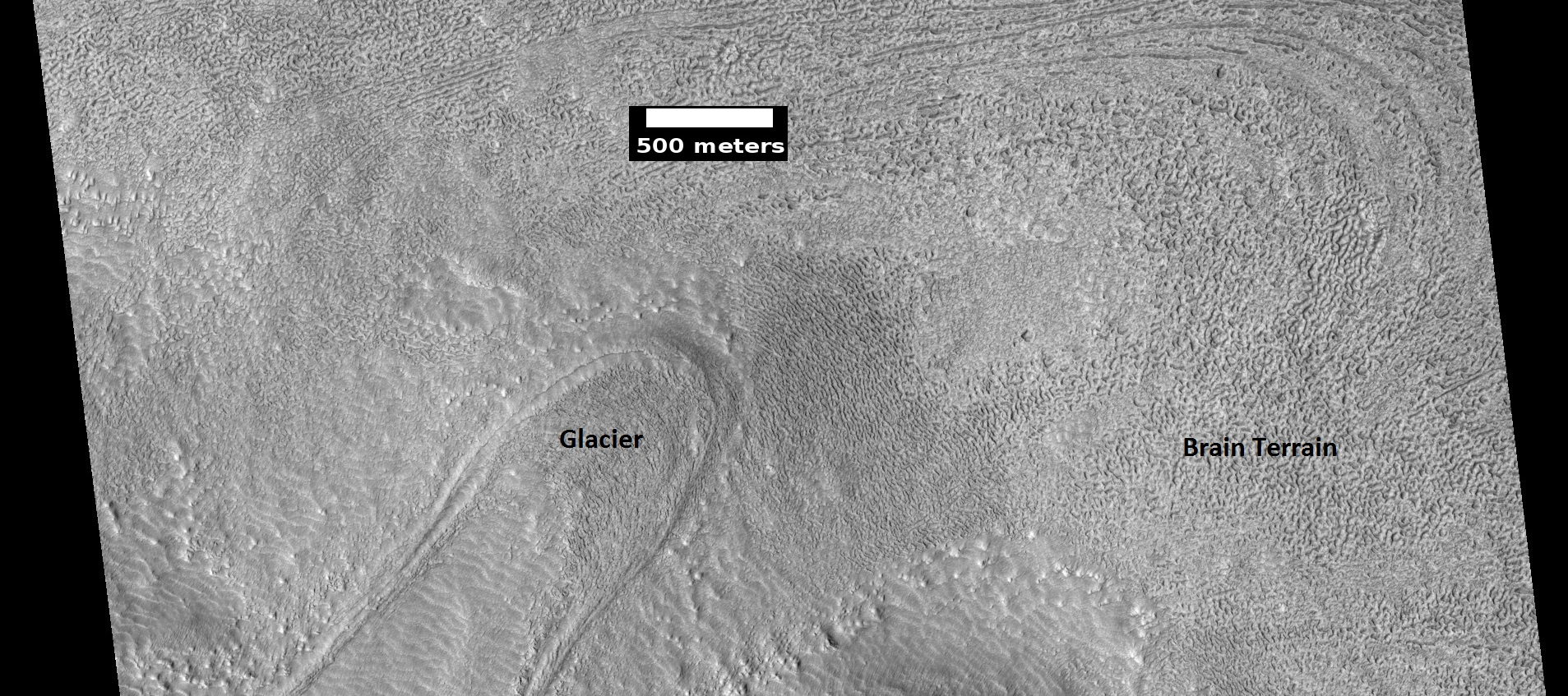
Possible glacier surrounded by brain terrain, as seen by HiRISE under HiWish program

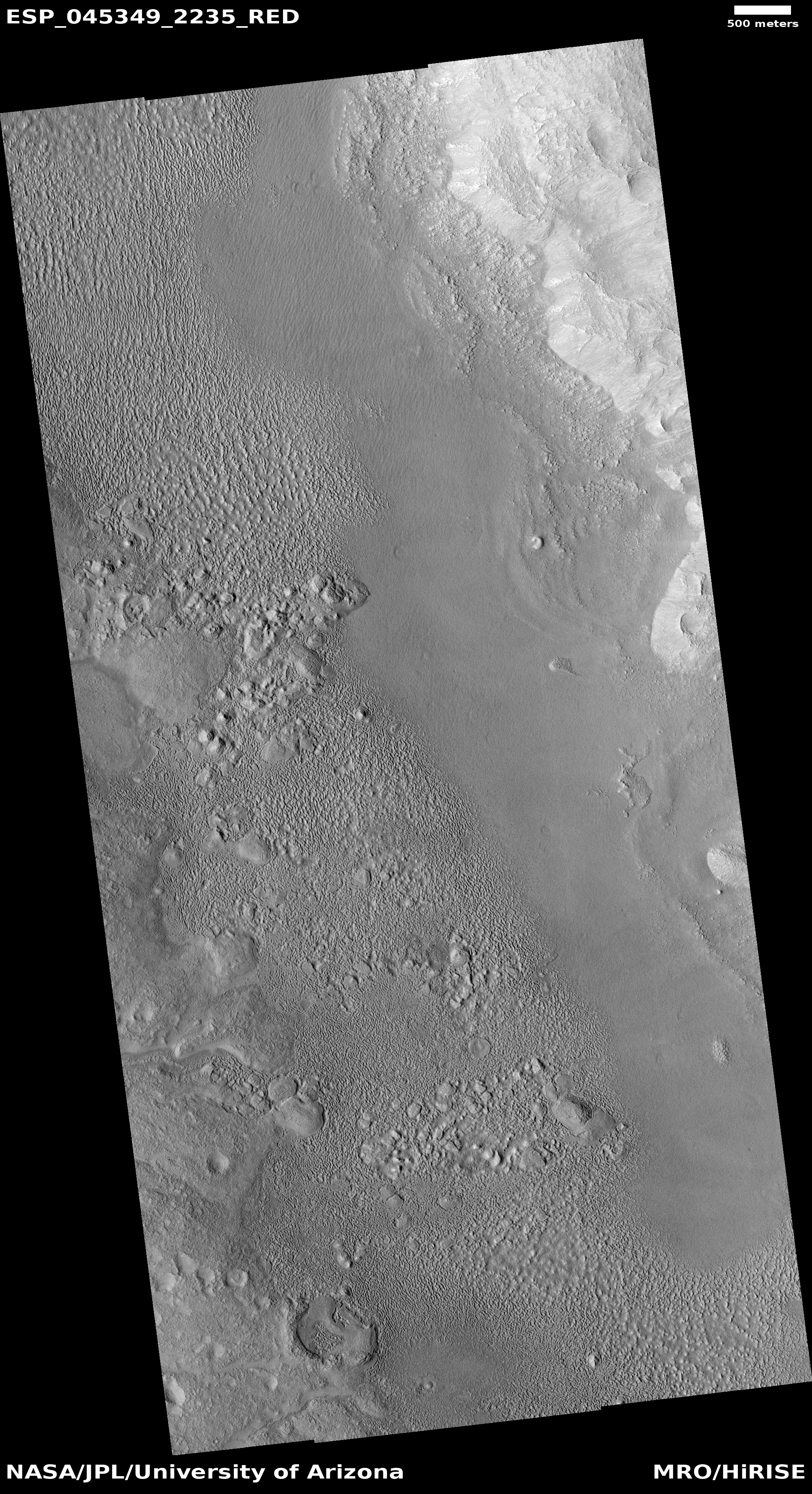
Wide view of brain terrain being formed, as seen by HiRISE under HiWish program

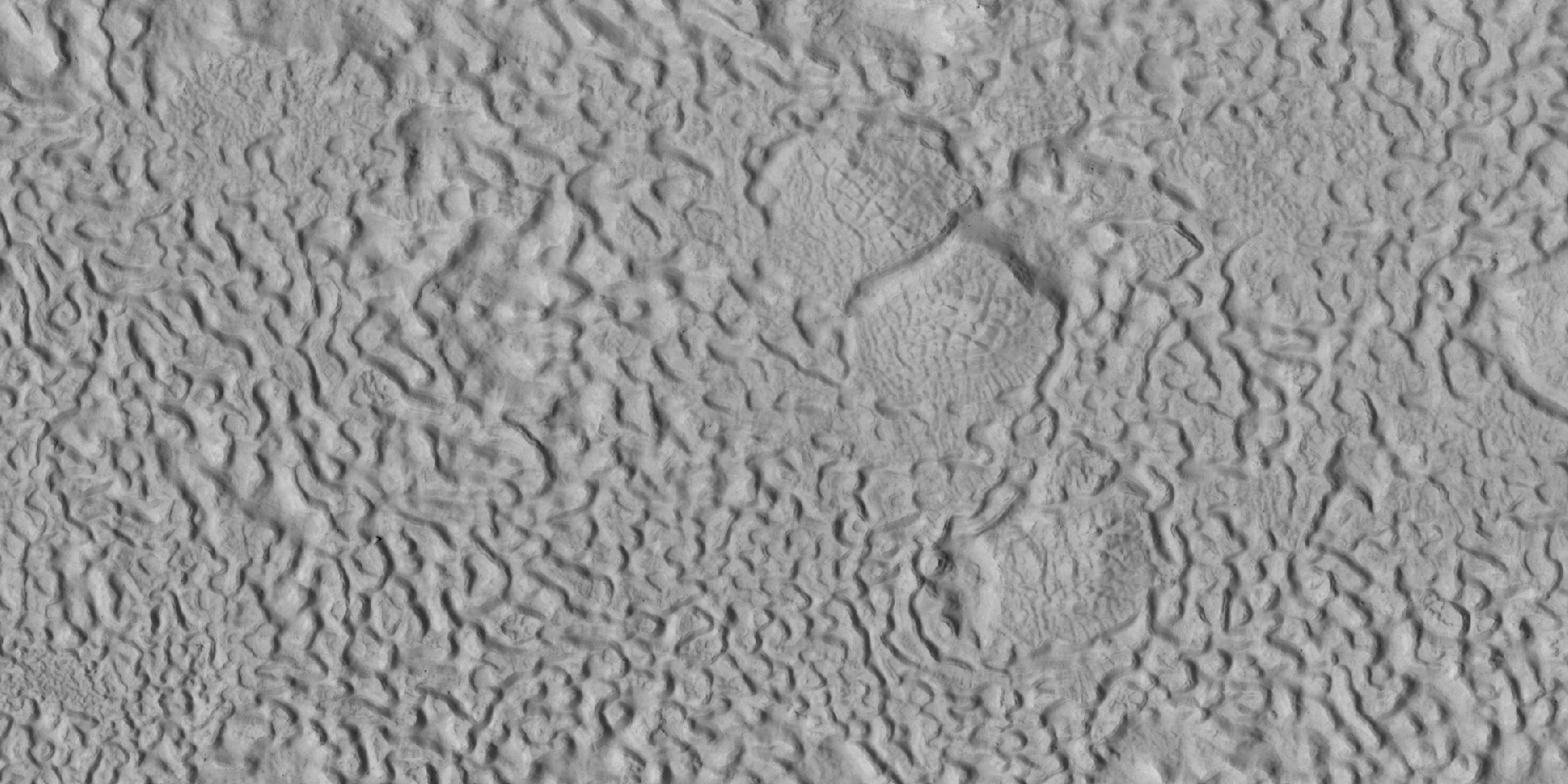
Brain terrain being formed, as seen by HiRISE under HiWish program Note: this is an enlargement of previous image using HiView.

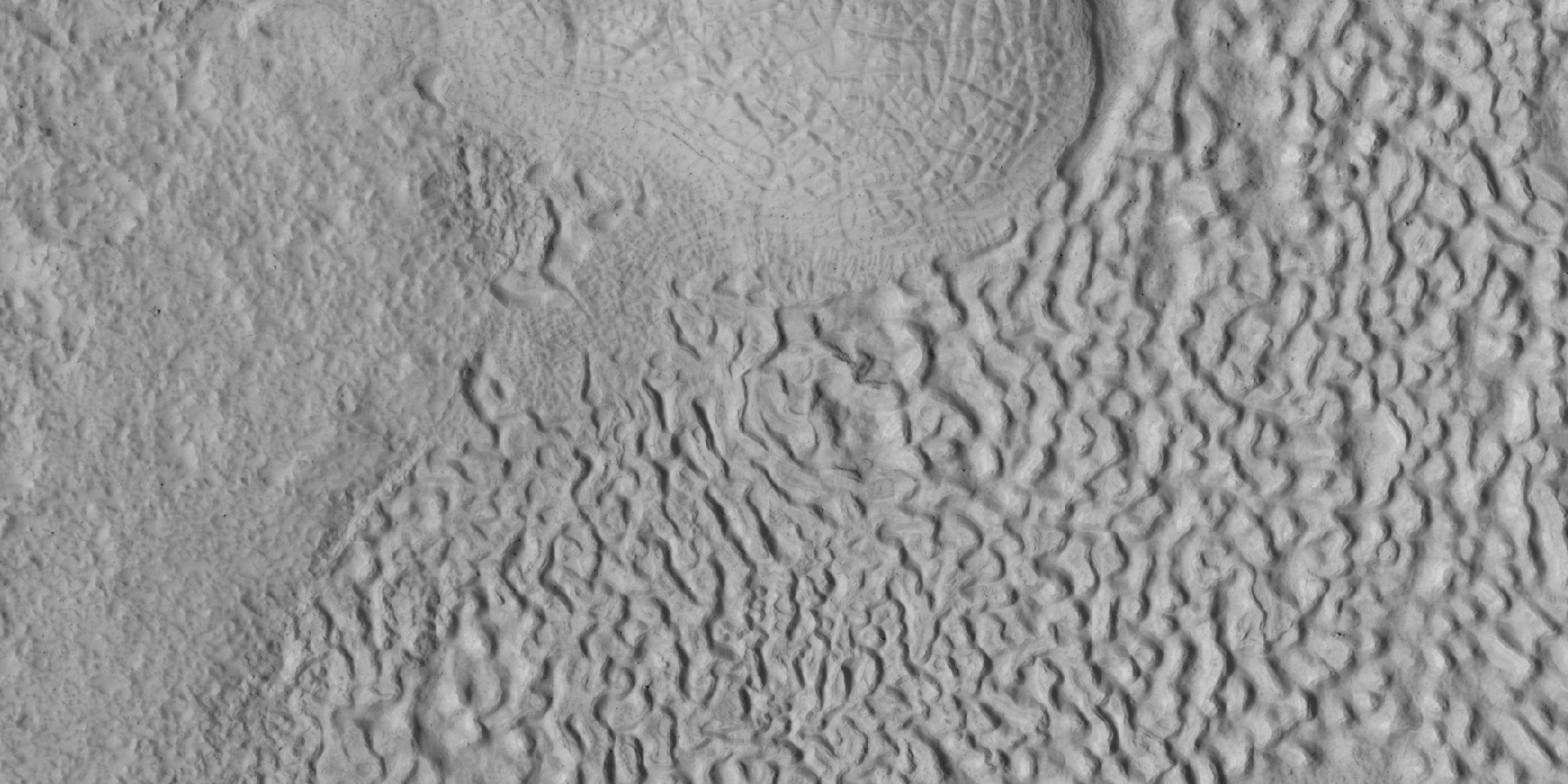
Brain terrain being formed, as seen by HiRISE under HiWish program Note: this is an enlargement of a previous image using HiView.

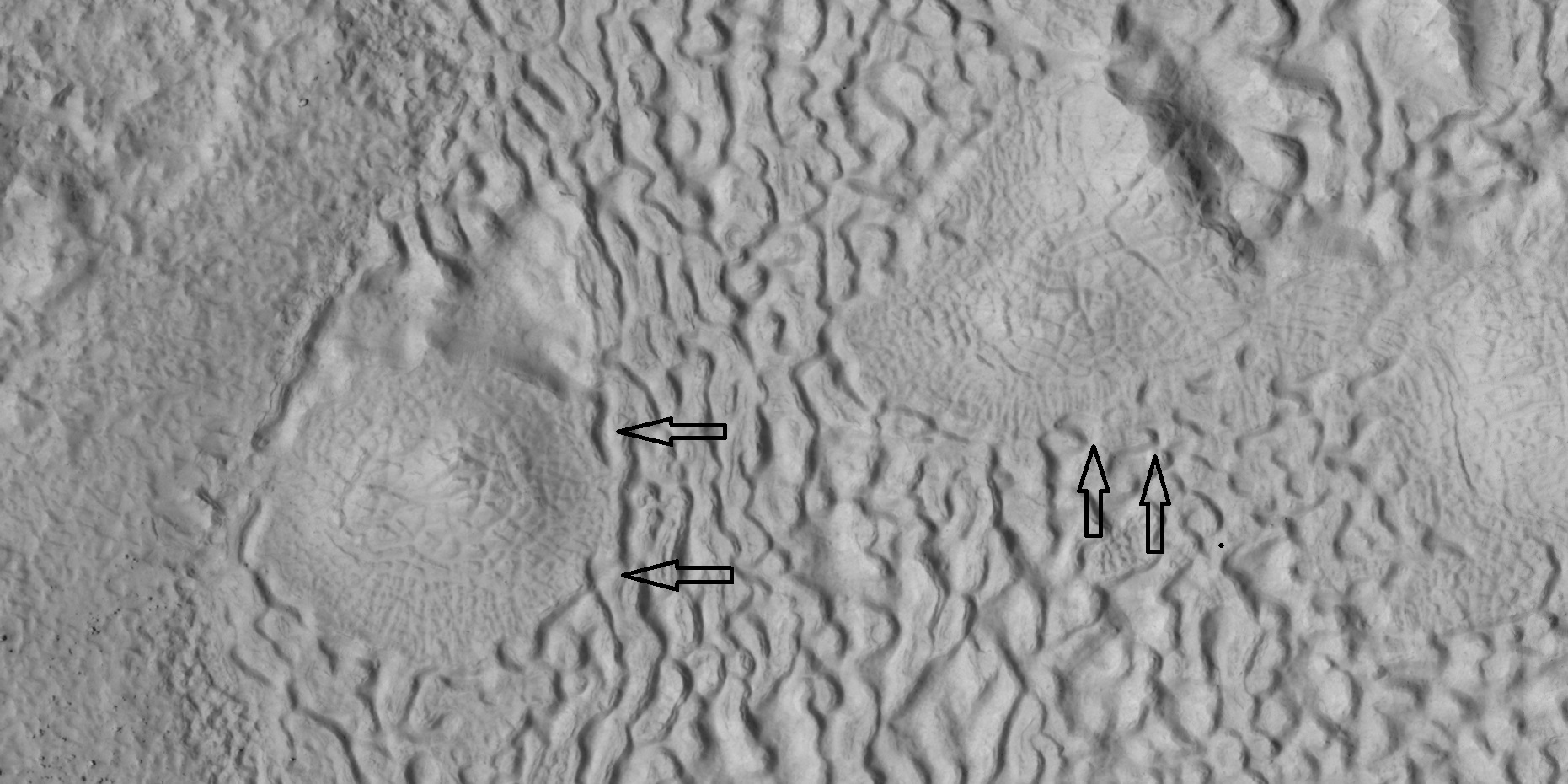
Brain terrain being formed, as seen by HiRISE under HiWish program Note: this is an enlargement of a previous image using HiView. Arrows indicate spots where brain terrain is beginning to form.

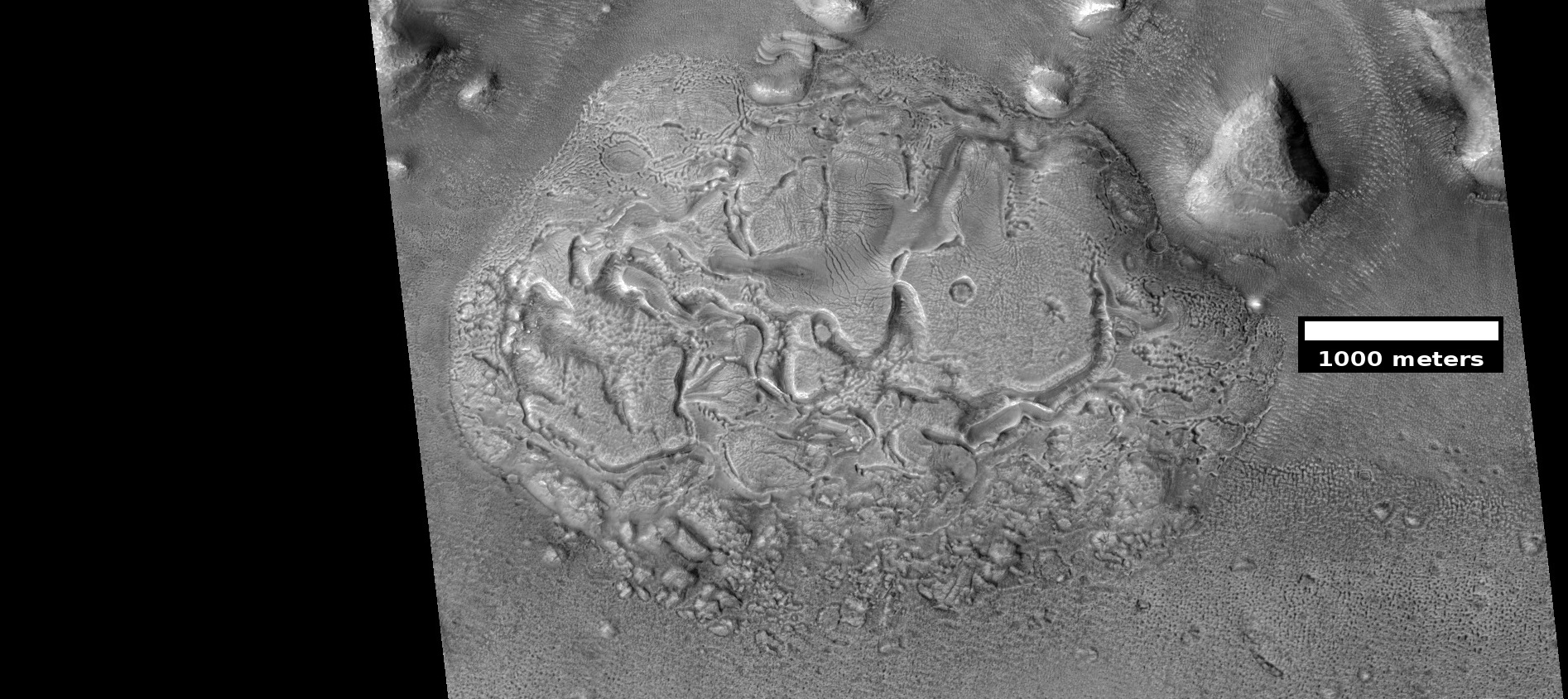
Wide view of brain terrain being formed, as seen by HiRISE under HiWish program

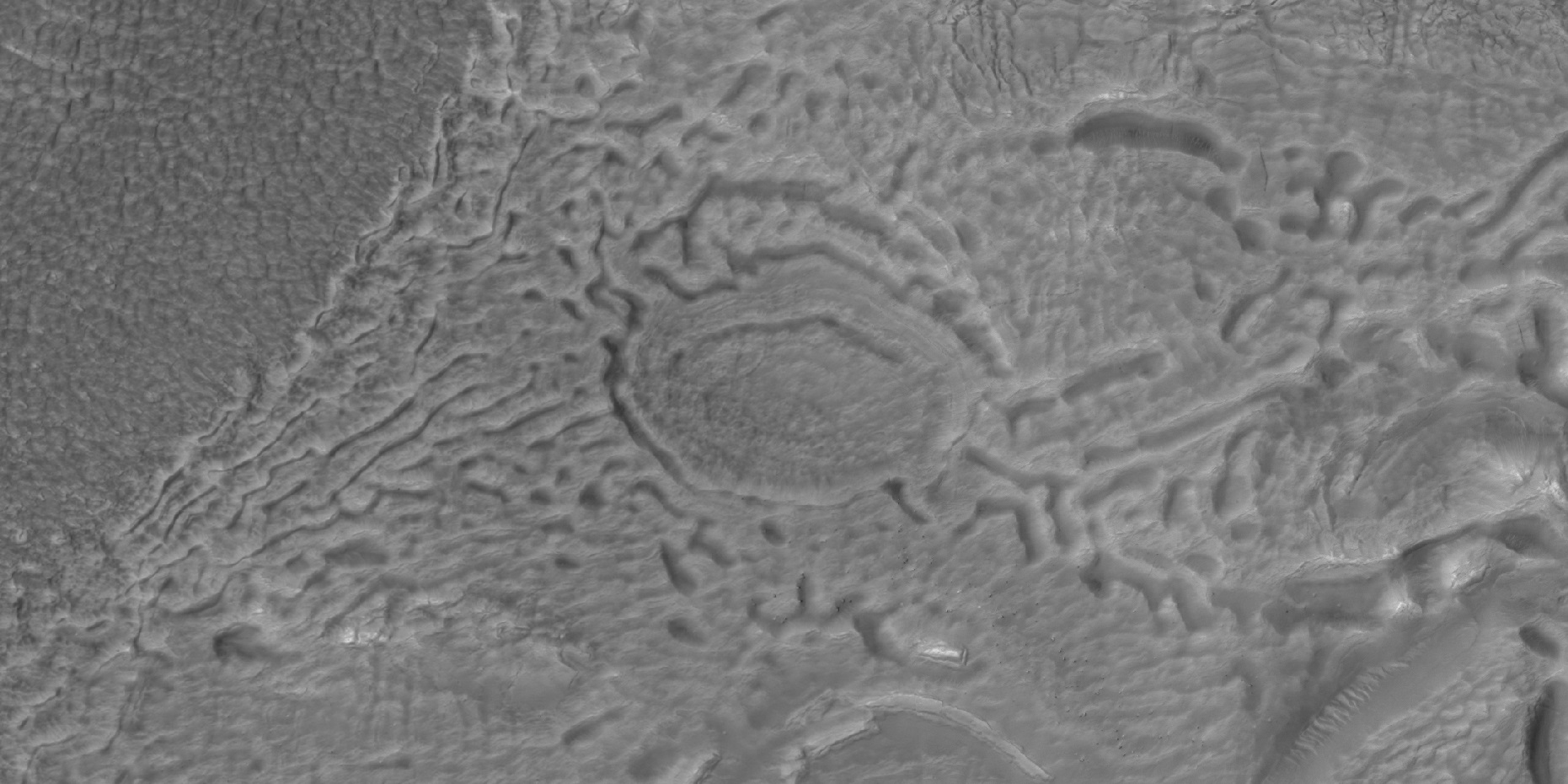
Brain terrain being formed, as seen by HiRISE under HiWish program Note: this is an enlargement of the previous image using HiView.

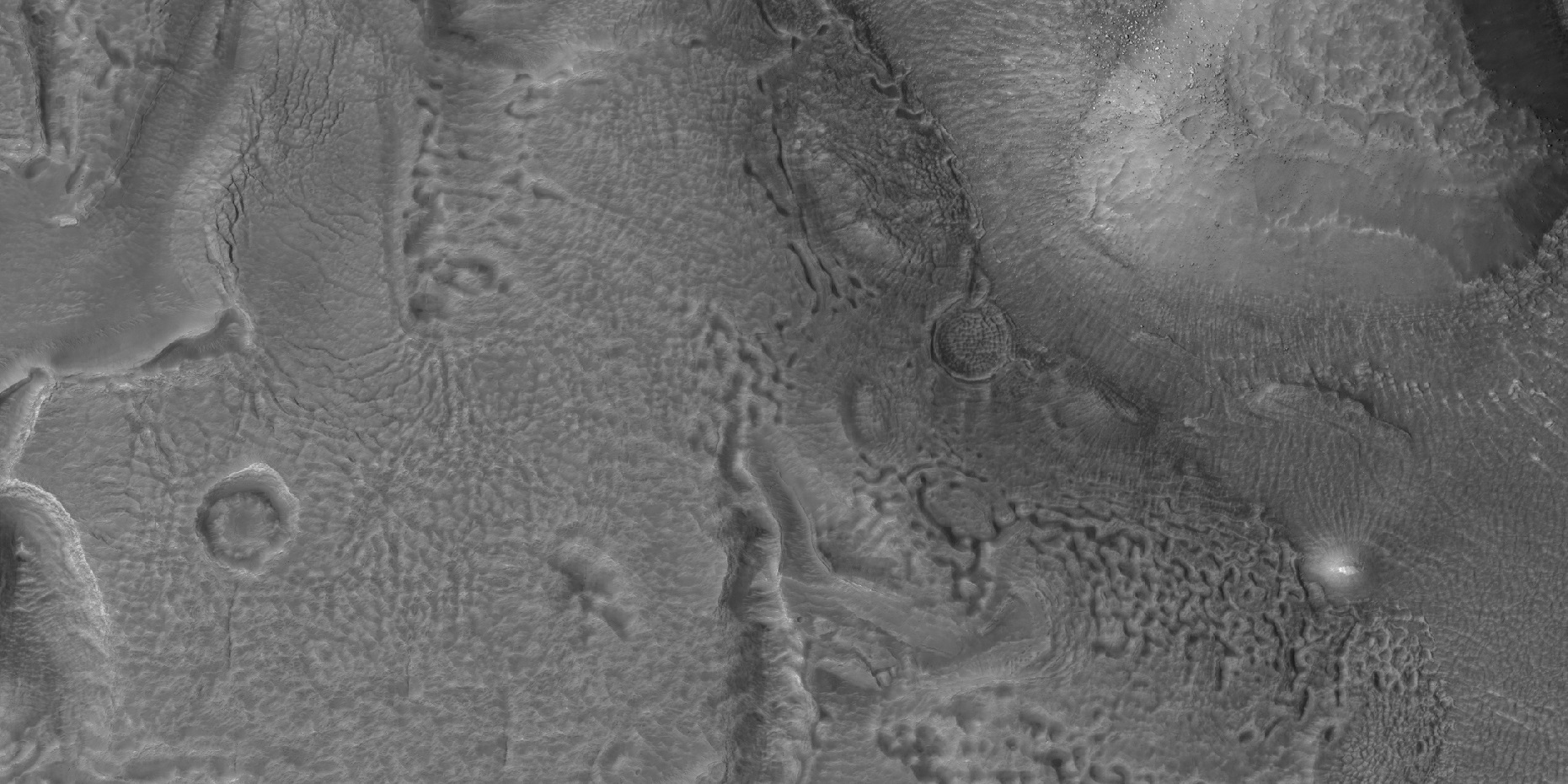
Brain terrain being formed, as seen by HiRISE under HiWish program Note: this is an enlargement of a previous image using HiView.

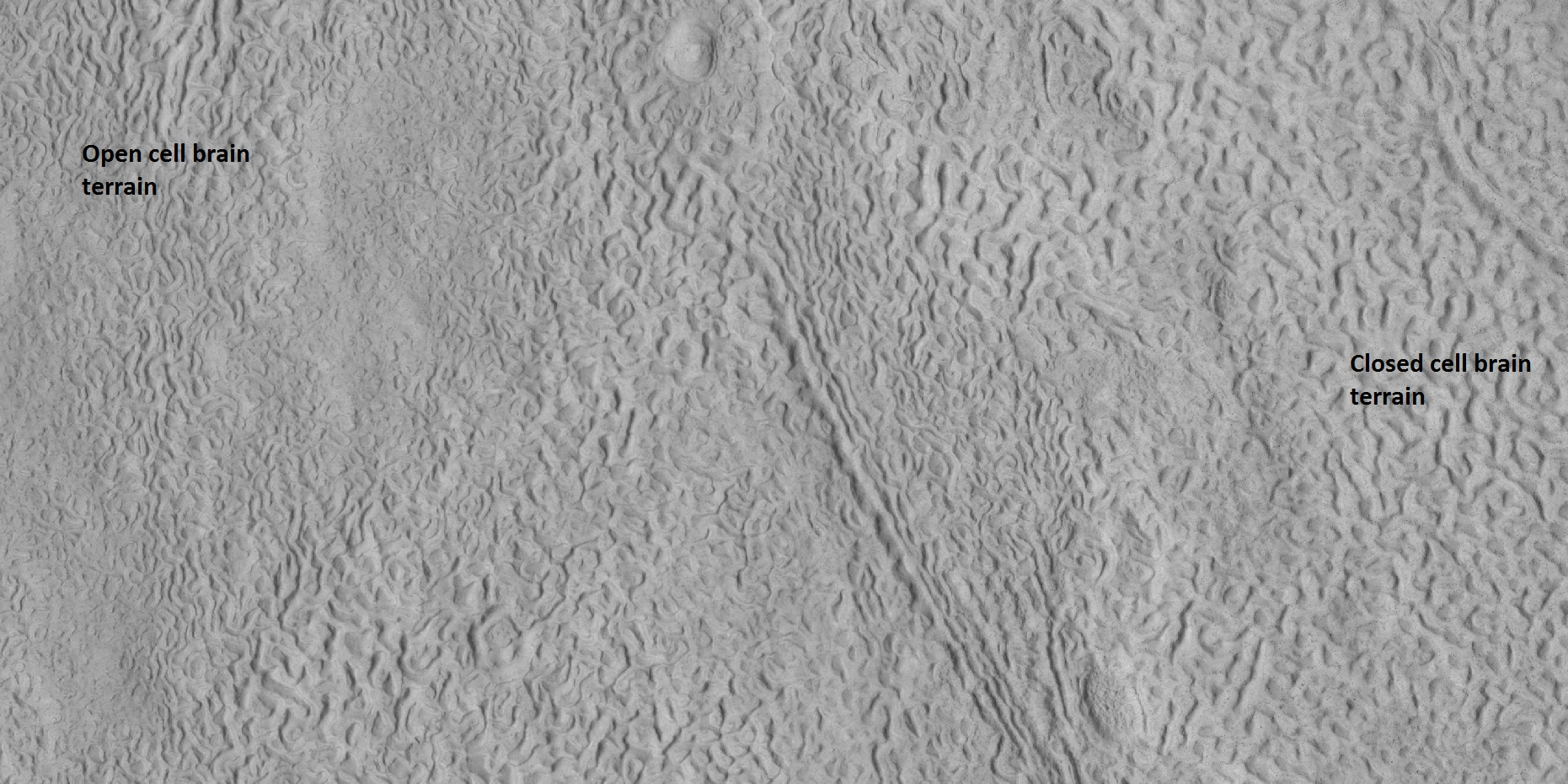
Open and closed brain terrain with labels, as seen by HiRISE under HiWish program Image location is Ismenius Lacus quadrangle.

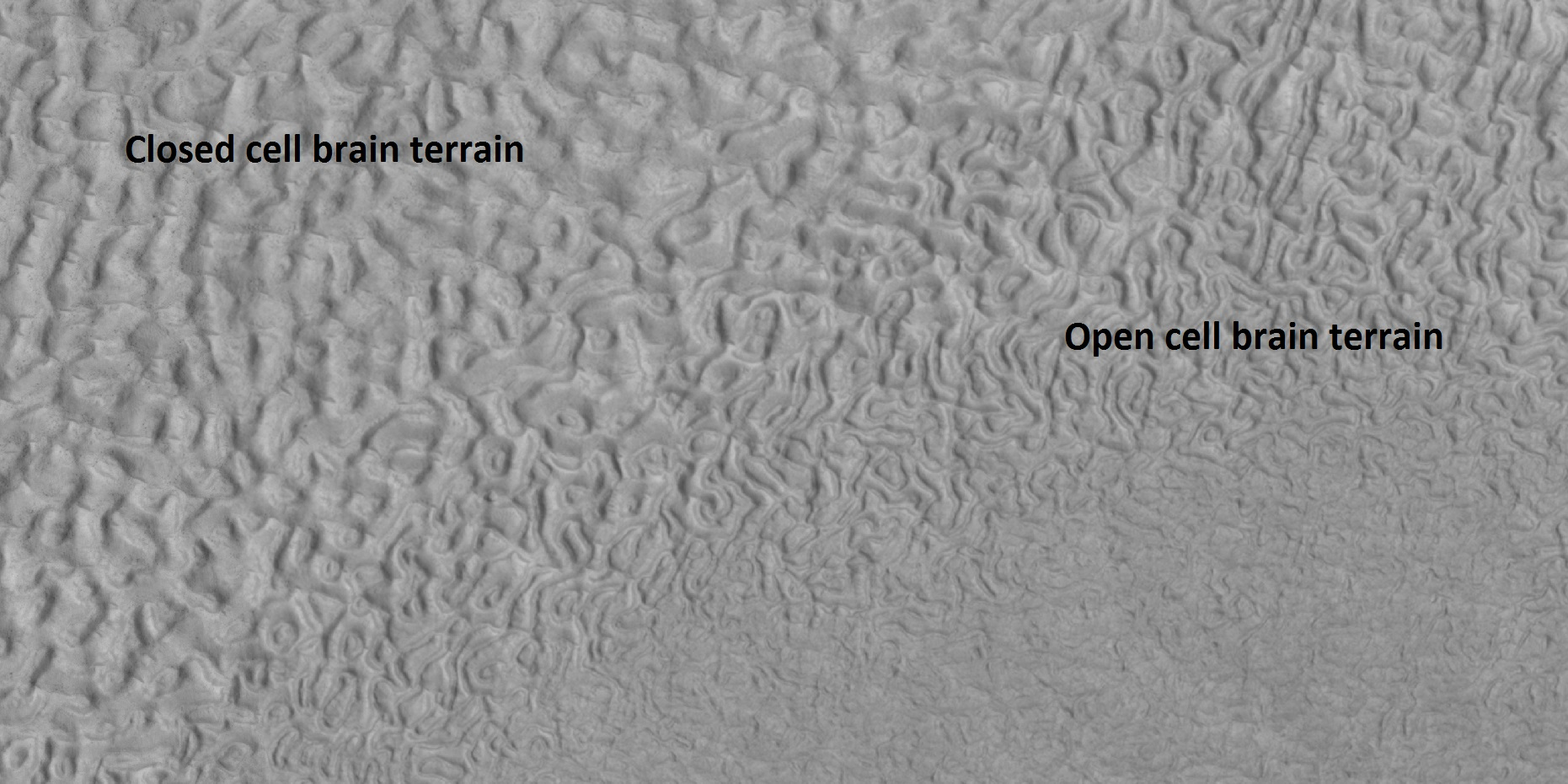
Open and closed brain terrain with labels, as seen by HiRISE under HiWish program Image location is Ismenius Lacus quadrangle.

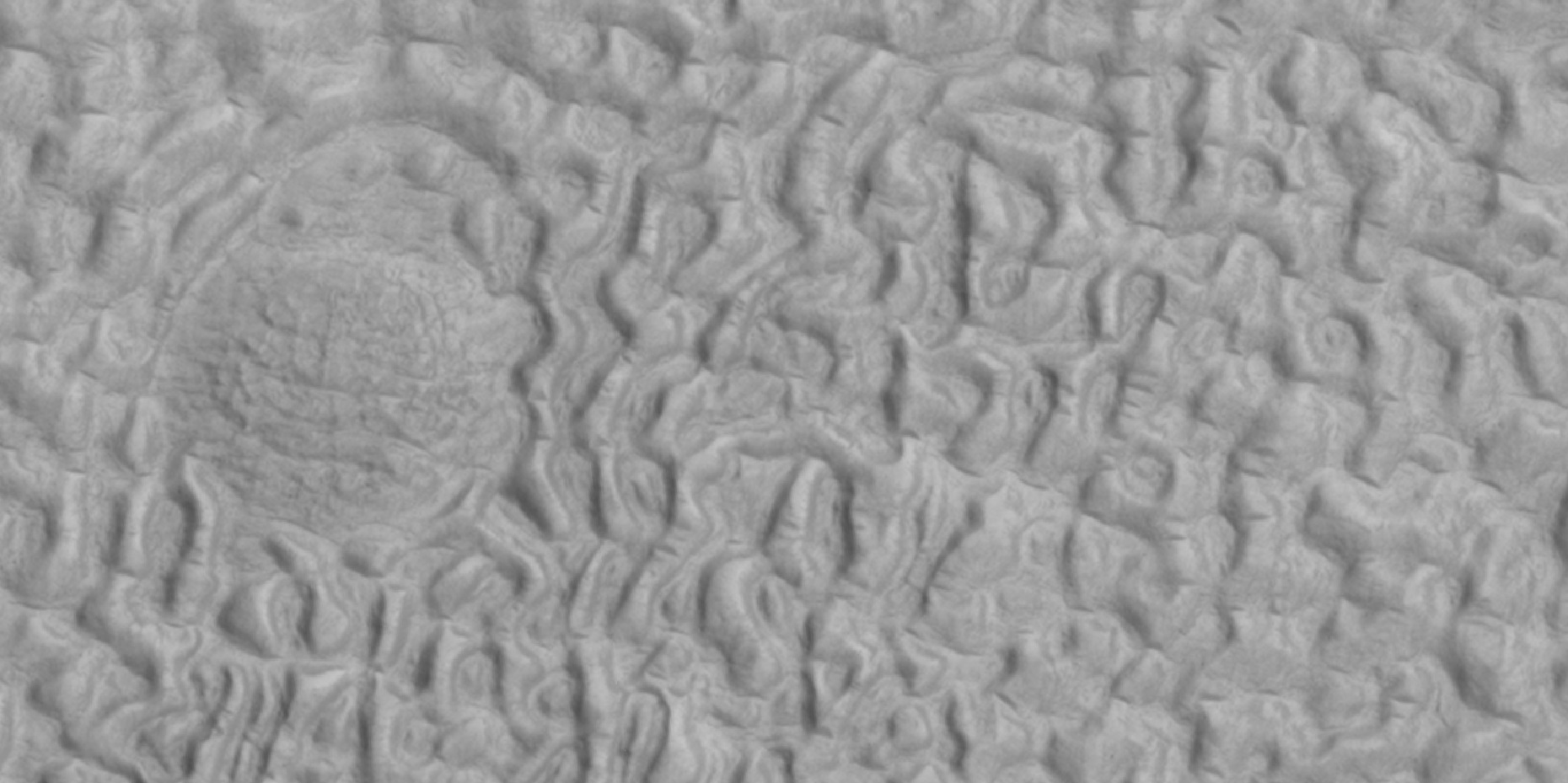
Brain terrain being formed, as seen by HiRISE under HiWish program Image location is Ismenius Lacus quadrangle.

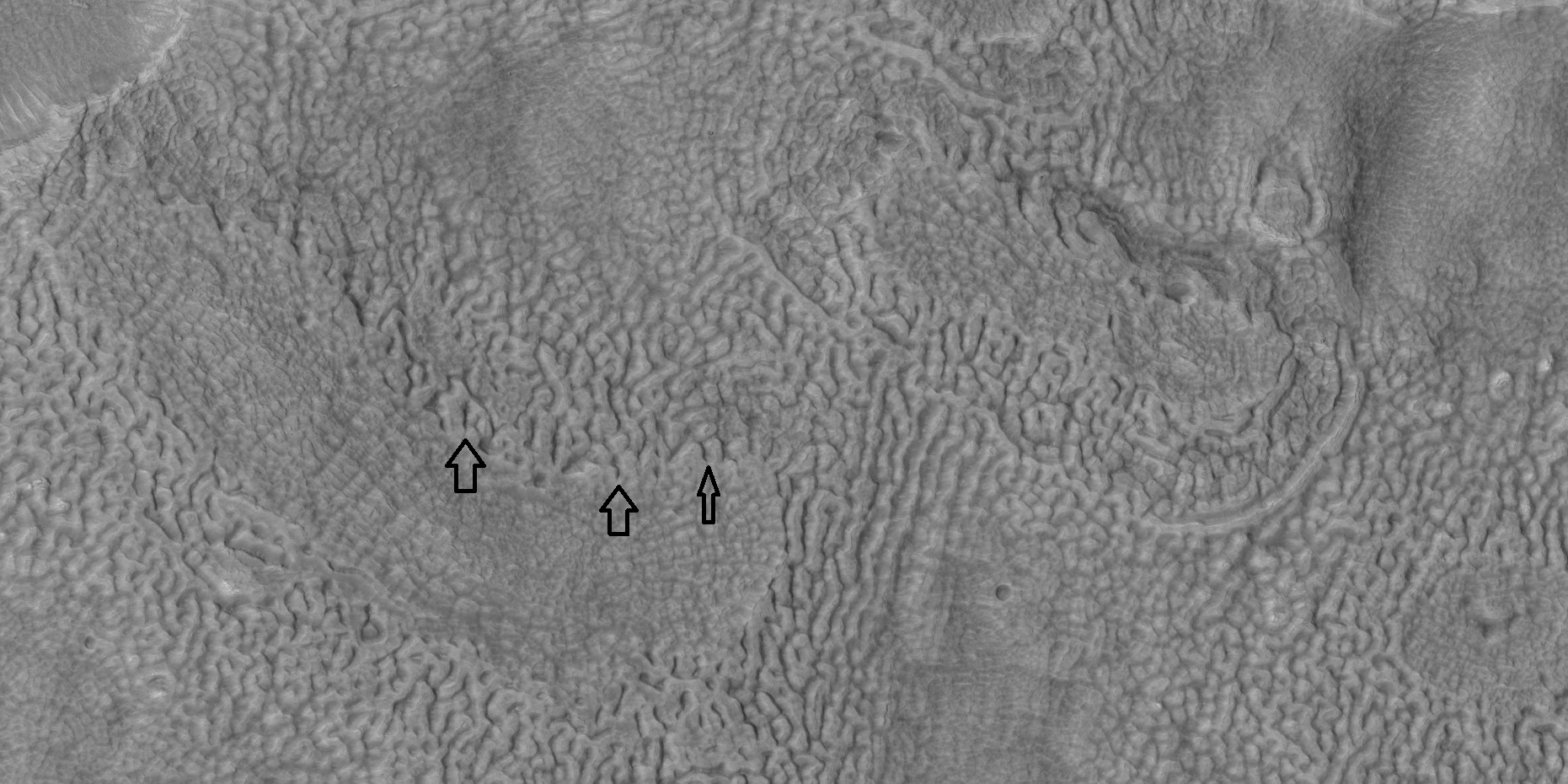
Brain terrain being formed, as seen by HiRISE under HiWish program Arrows point to locations where the brain terrain is starting to form. Image location is Ismenius Lacus quadrangle.

== See also ==
- Concentric crater fill – Landform where the floor of a crater is mostly covered by parallel ridges
- Glacier – Persistent body of ice that moves downhill under its own weight
- Glaciers on Mars – Extraterrestrial bodies of ice
- Ismenius Lacus quadrangle – Map of Mars
- Lineated valley fill – Martian geologic feature
- Lobate debris apron – Geological features on Mars
- Martian dichotomy – Geomorphological feature of Mars
- Nilosyrtis Mensae – Fretted terrain in the Casius quadrangle on Mars
- Protonilus Mensae – Martian plain
- Upper Plains Unit – Surface features of Mars
