= Lineated valley fill =

Martian geologic feature

Lineated valley fill (LVF), also called lineated floor deposit, is a feature of the floors of some channels on Mars, exhibiting ridges and grooves that seem to flow around obstacles. Shadow measurements show that at least some of the ridges are several metres high. LVF is believed to be ice-rich. Hundreds of metres of ice probably lie protected in LVF under a thin layer of debris. The debris consists of wind-borne dust, material from alcove walls, and lag material remaining after ice sublimated (changed from a solid directly to a gas) from a rock-ice mixture. Some glaciers on Earth show similar ridges. High-resolution pictures taken with HiRISE reveal that some of the surfaces of lineated valley fill are covered with strange patterns called closed-cell and open-cell brain terrain. The terrain resembles a human brain. It is believed to be caused by cracks in the surface accumulating dust and other debris, together with ice sublimating from some of the surfaces. The cracks are the result stress from gravity and seasonal heating and cooling. This same type of surface is present on Lobate debris aprons and Concentric crater fill so all three are believed to be related. Indeed, lobate debris aprons (LDA's) and lineated valley fill (LVF) are basically the same--mostly ice with a covering of debris, their shapes are dependent on their locations. When confined within a valley, LVF is present; in contrast when not confined, this flowing debris covered ice forms LDA's.

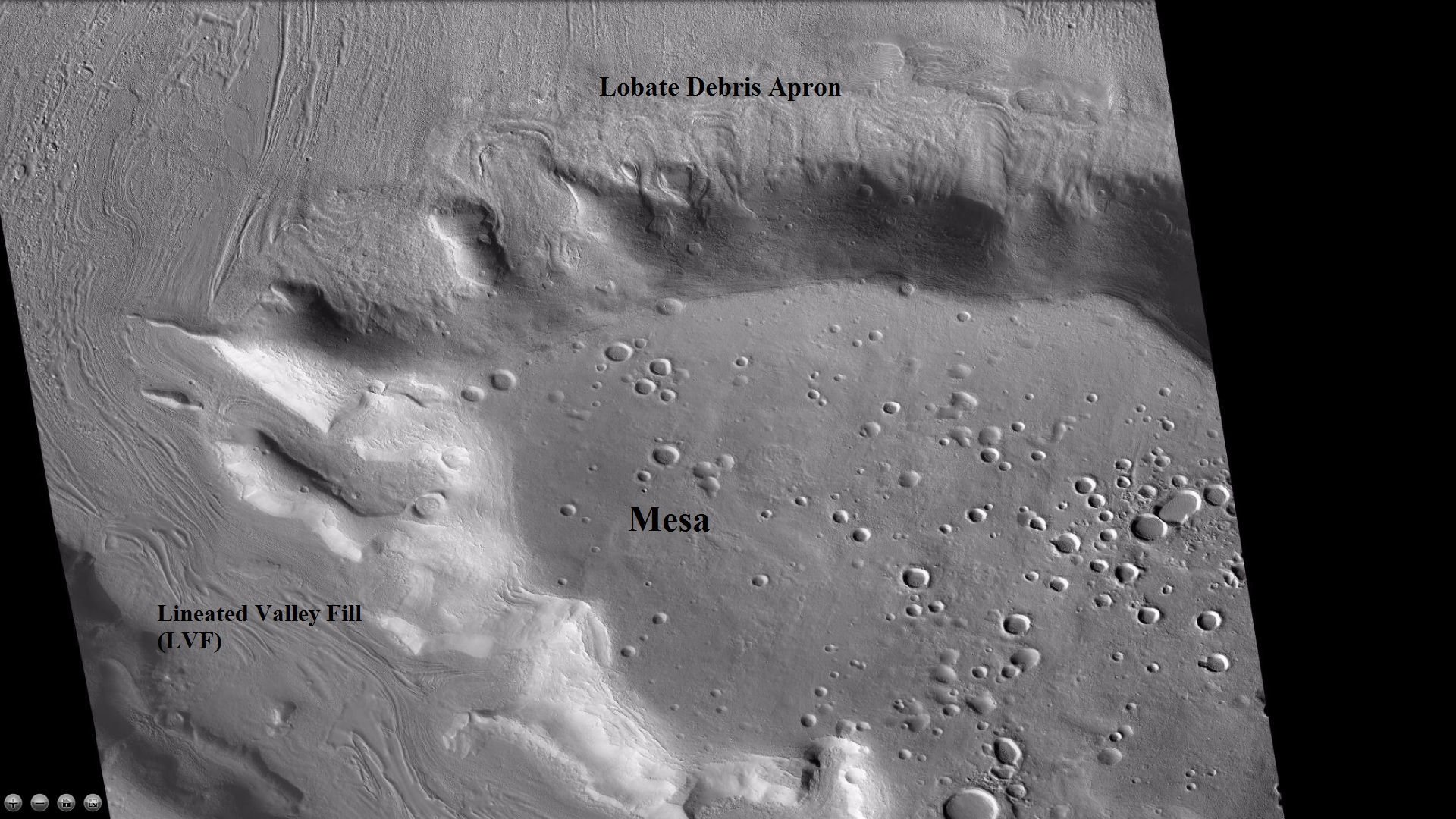
Wide CTX view of mesa showing lineated valley fill and lobate debris apron (LDA). Both are believed to be debris-covered glaciers. Location is Ismenius Lacus quadrangle.

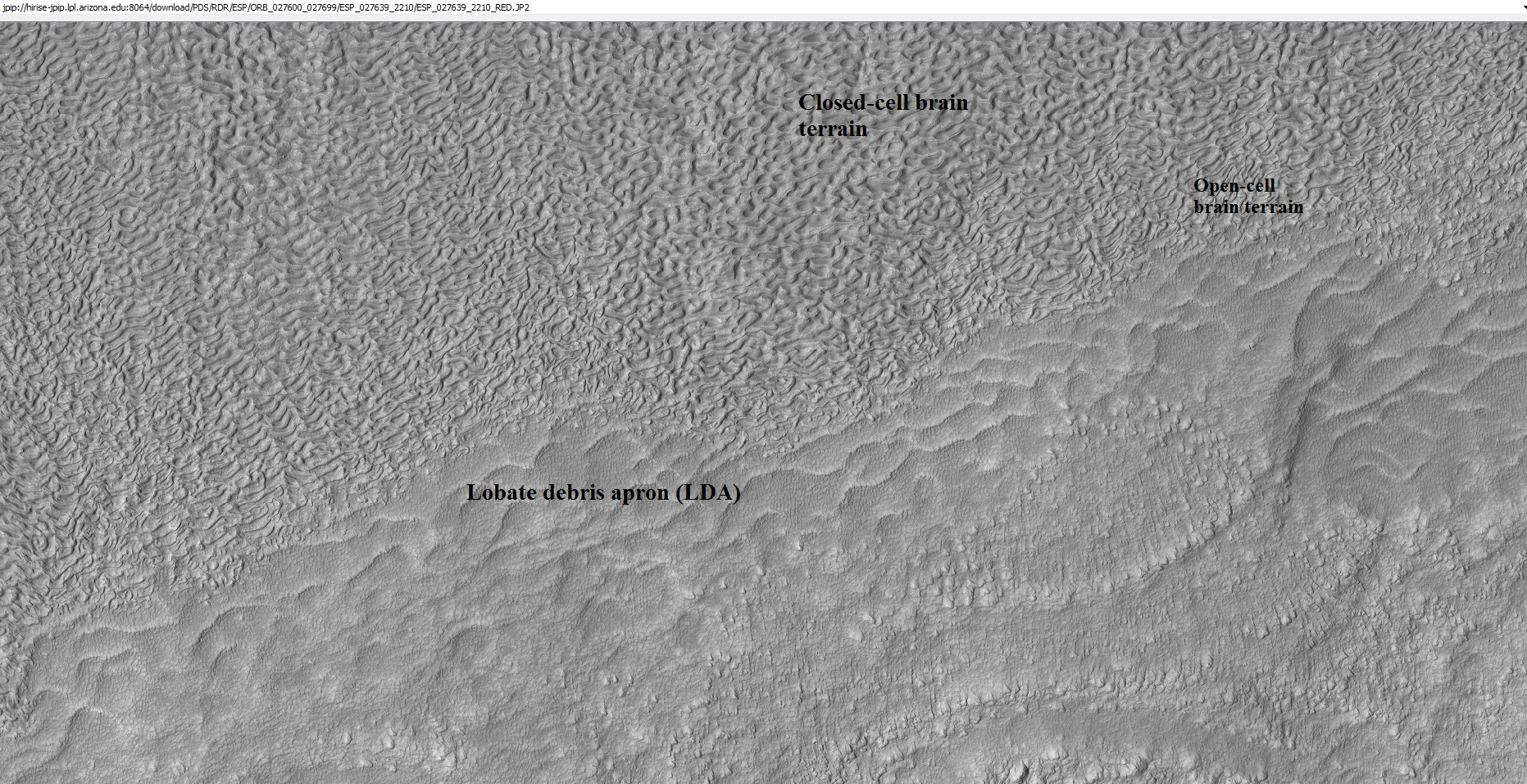
Close-up of lobate debris apron from the previous CTX image of a mesa. Image shows open-cell brain terrain and closed-cell brain terrain, which is more common. Open-cell brain terrain is thought to hold a core of ice. Image is from HiRISE under HiWish program.

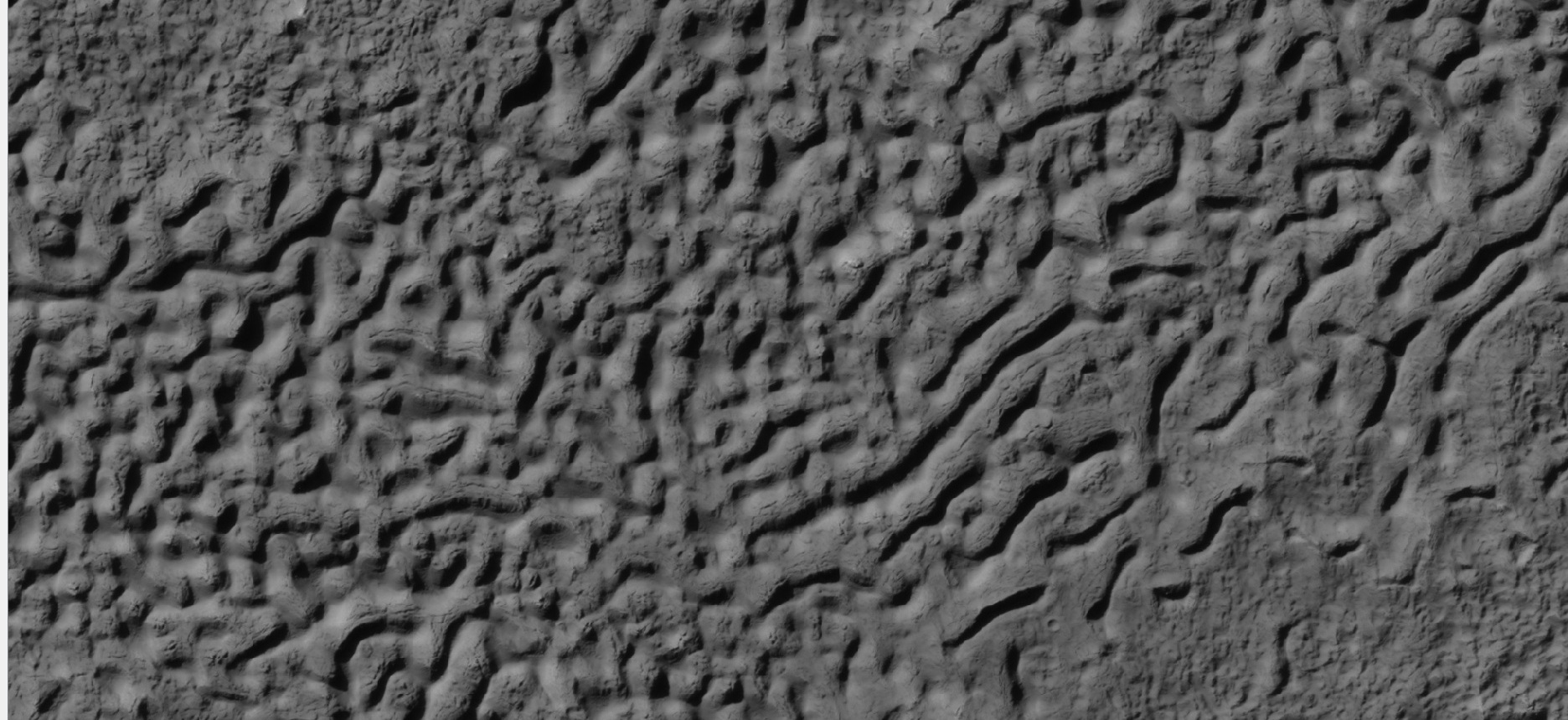
Closed-cell brain terrain, as seen by HiRISE under the HiWish program. This type of surface is common on lobate debris aprons, concentric crater fill, and lineated valley fill.

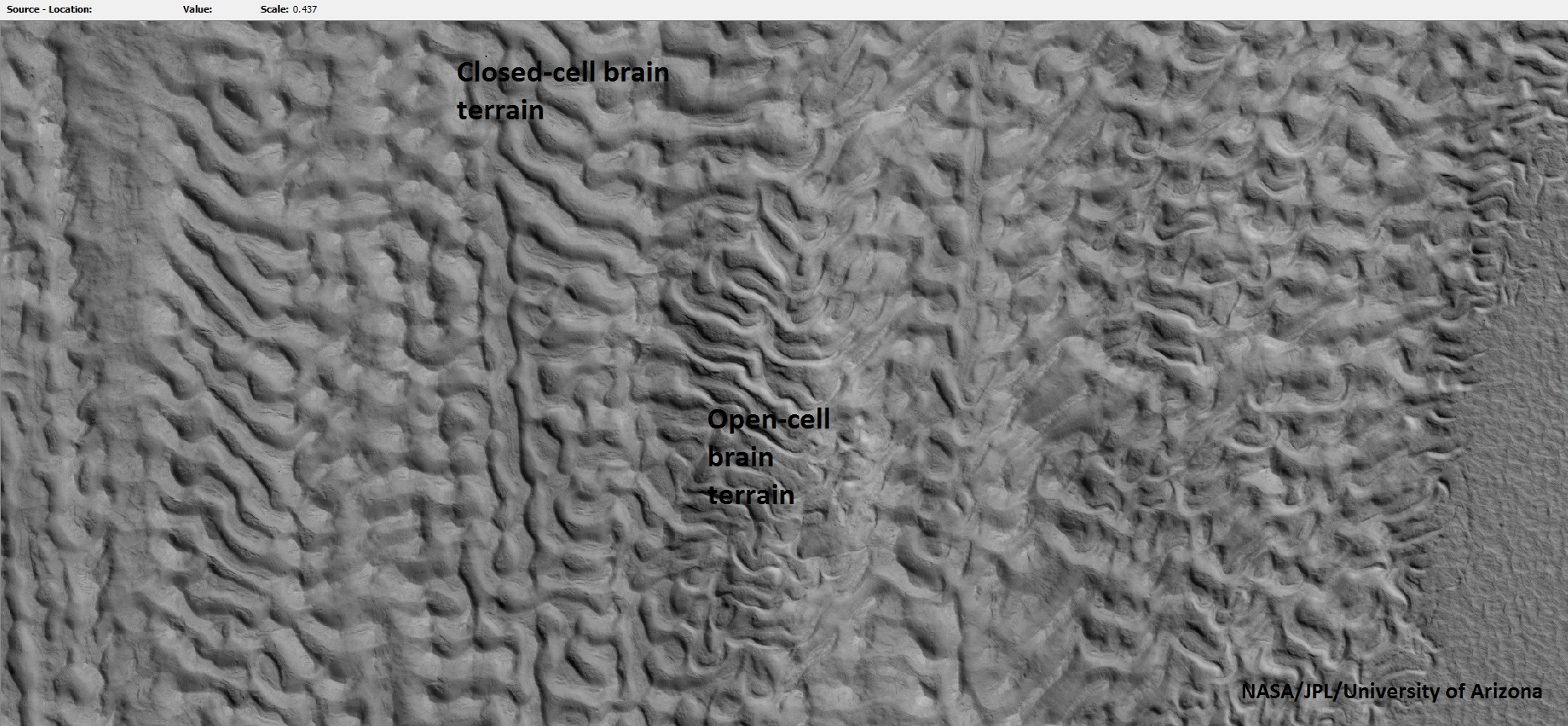
Open- and closed-cell brain terrain, as seen by HiRISE, under HiWish program.
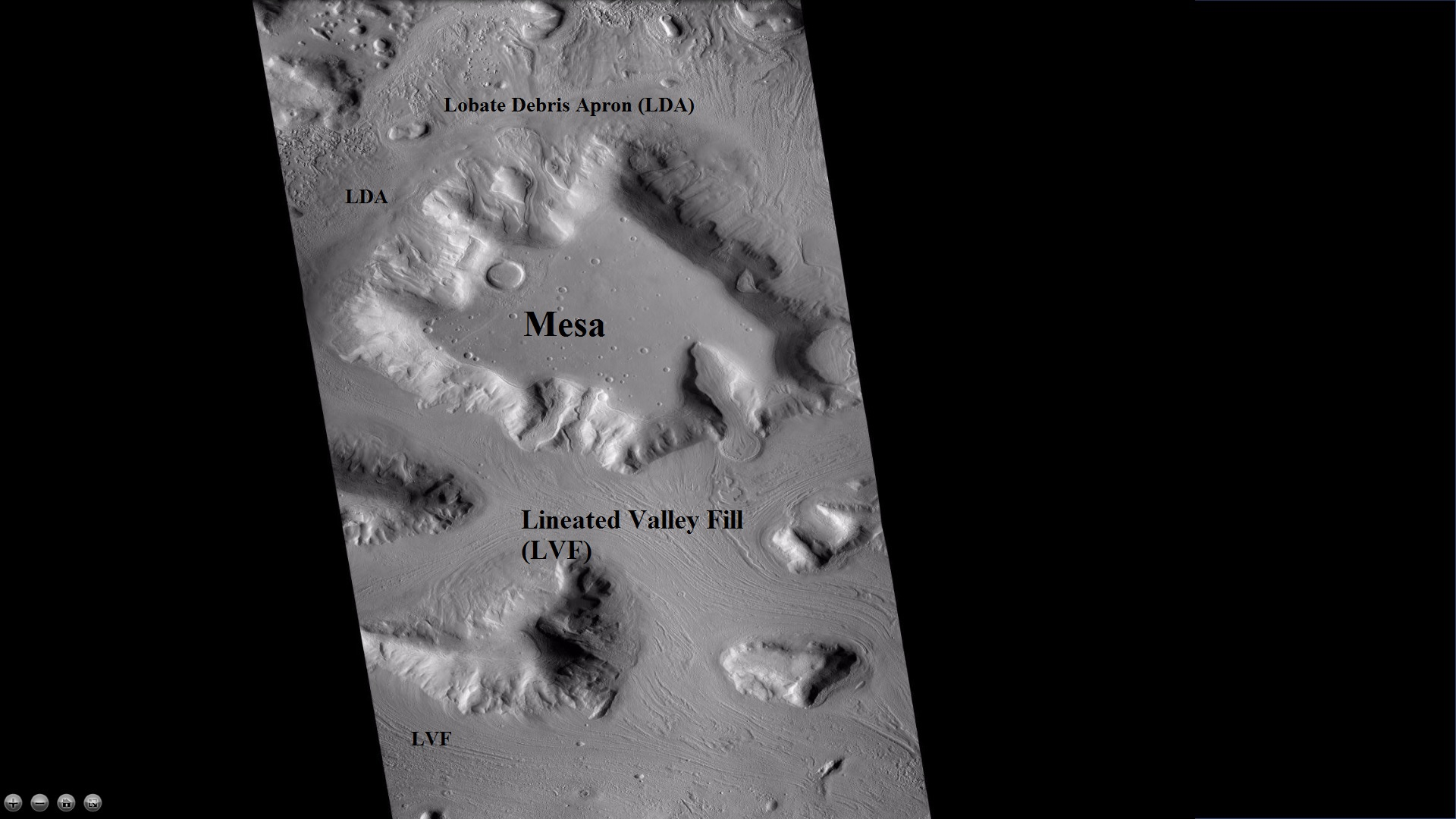
Wide CTX view showing mesa and buttes with lobate debris aprons and lineated valley fill around them. Location is Ismenius Lacus quadrangle.

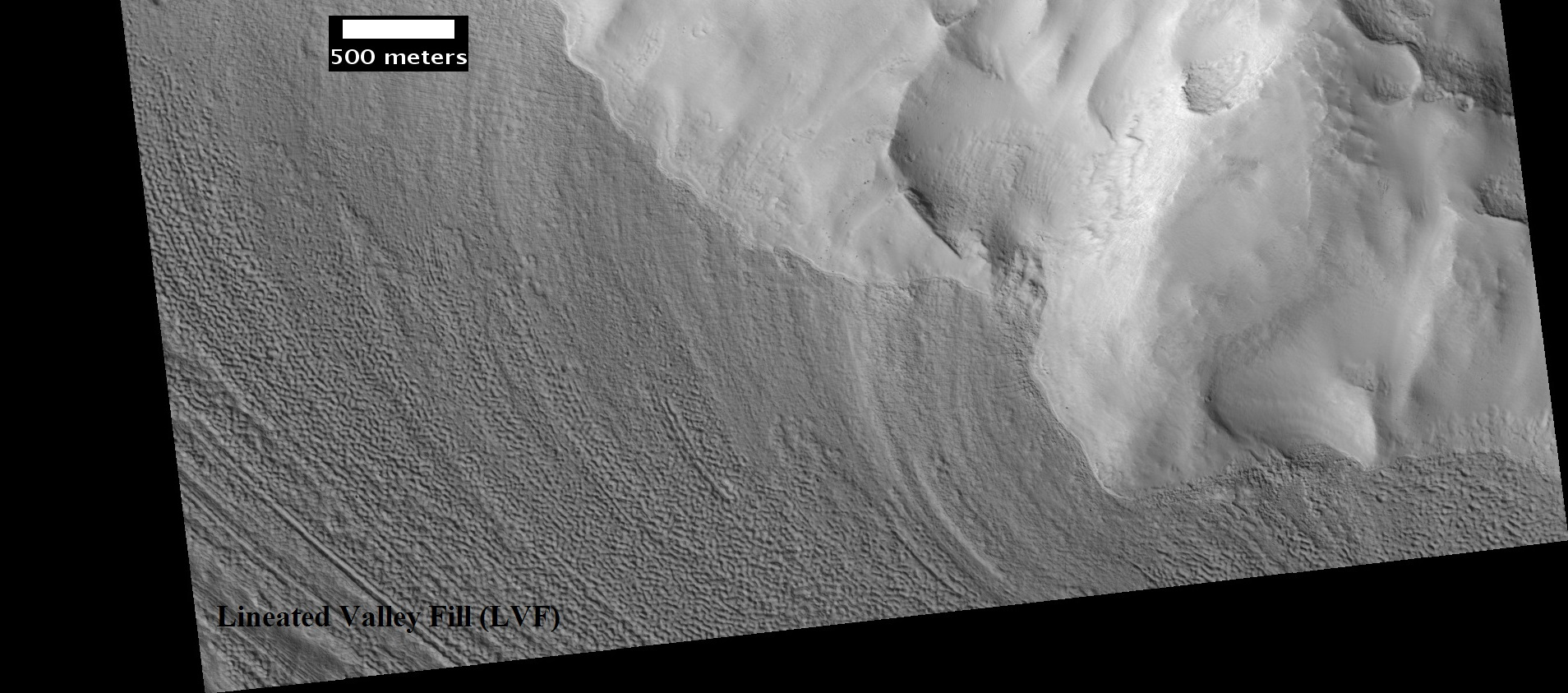
Close-up of lineated valley fill (LVF), as seen by HiRISE under HiWish program. Note: this is an enlargement of the previous CTX image.

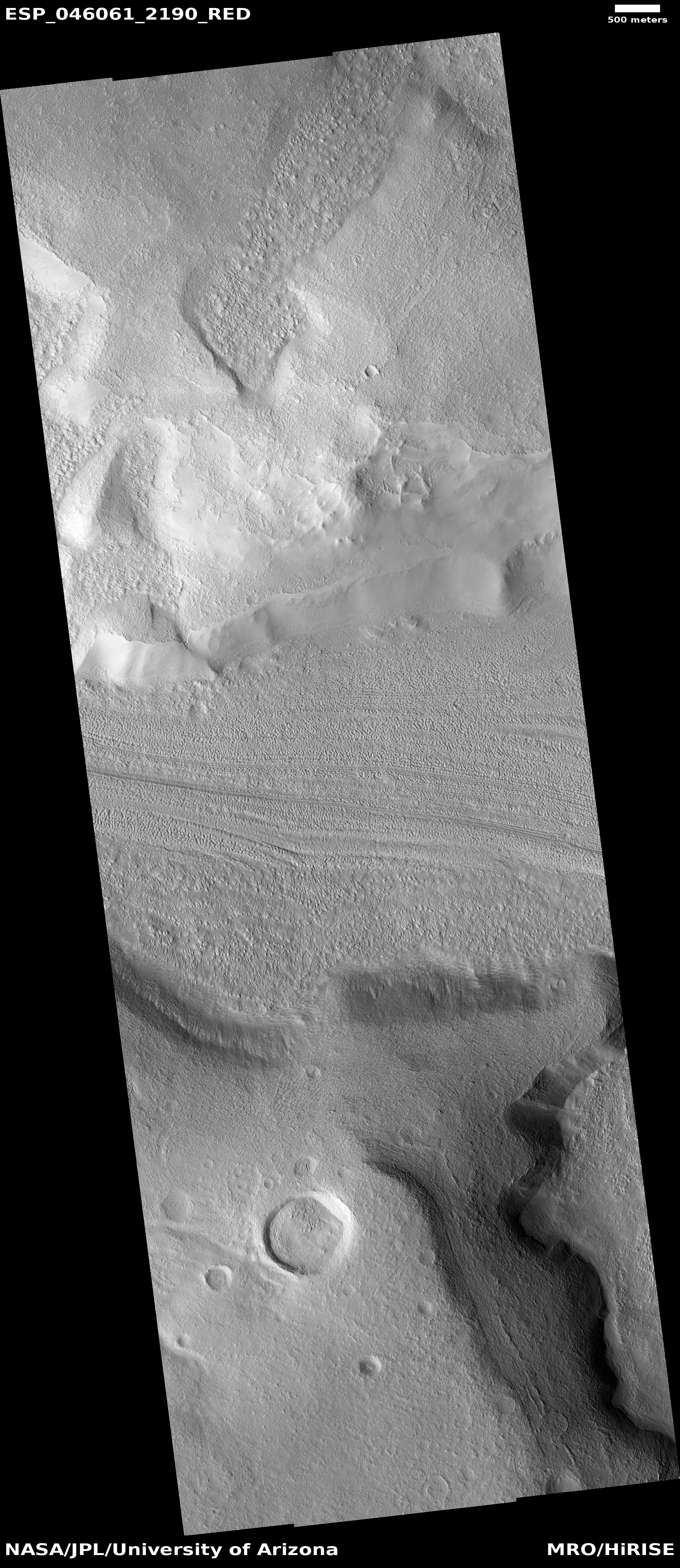
Lineated valley fill, as seen by HiRISE under HiWish program.

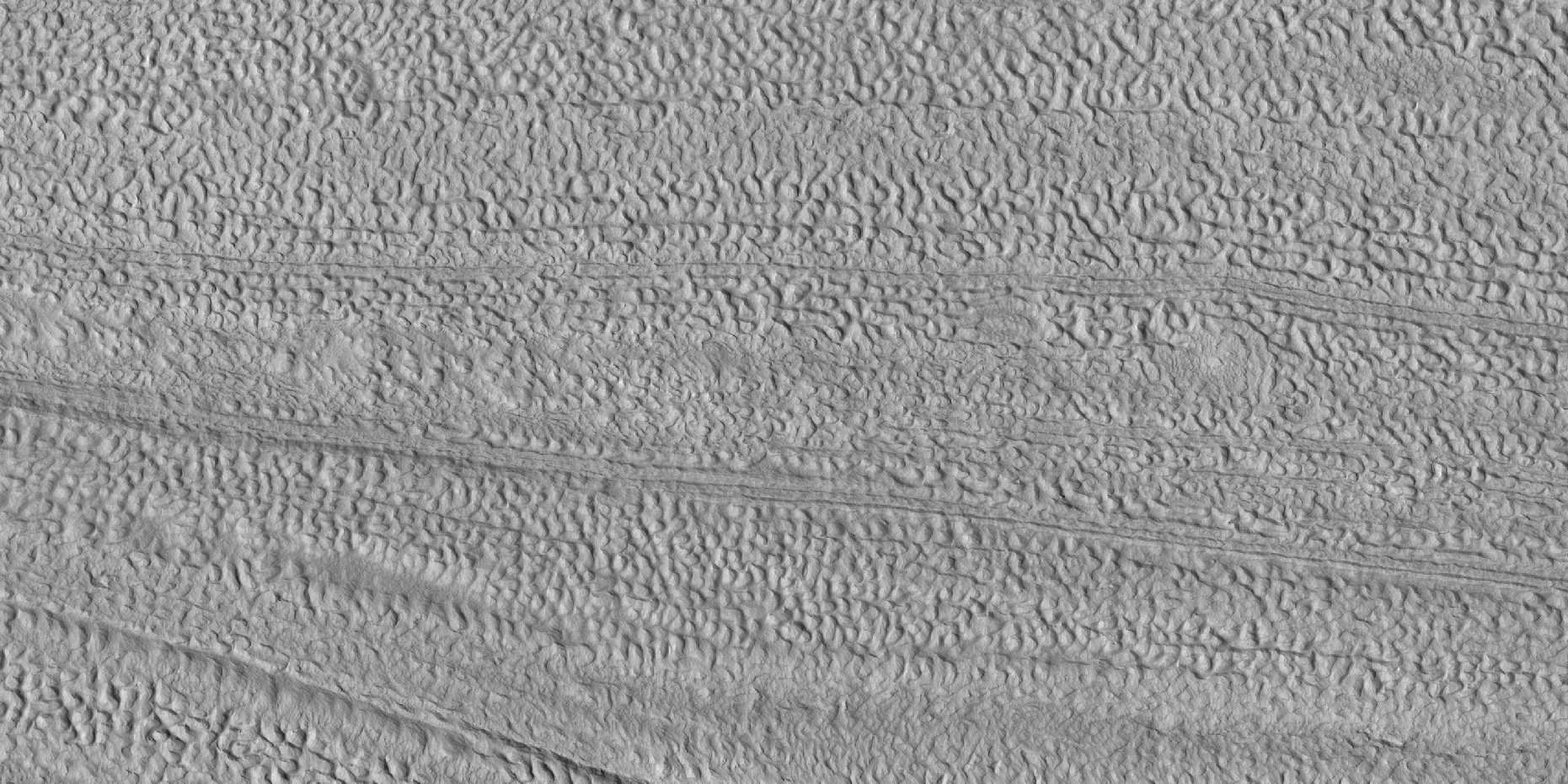
Close view of Lineated valley fill, as seen by HiRISE under HiWish program

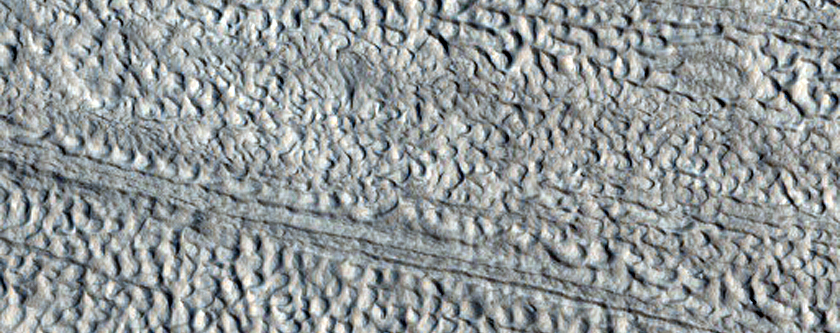
Close, color view of Lineated valley fill, as seen by HiRISE under HiWish program

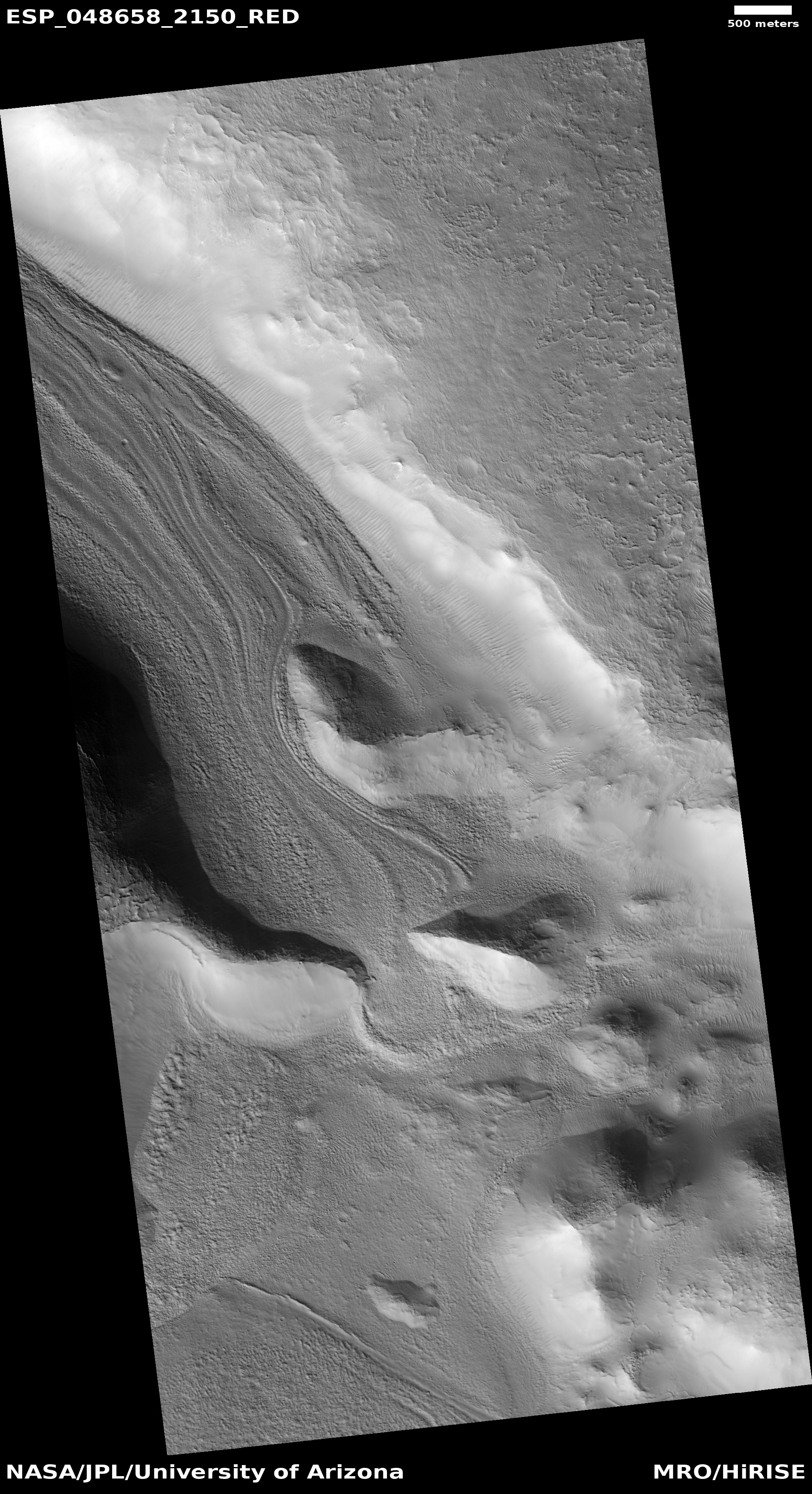
Valley showing Lineated valley fill, as seen by HiRISE under HiWish program Linear valley flow is caused by ice movements. Location is Casius quadrangle.
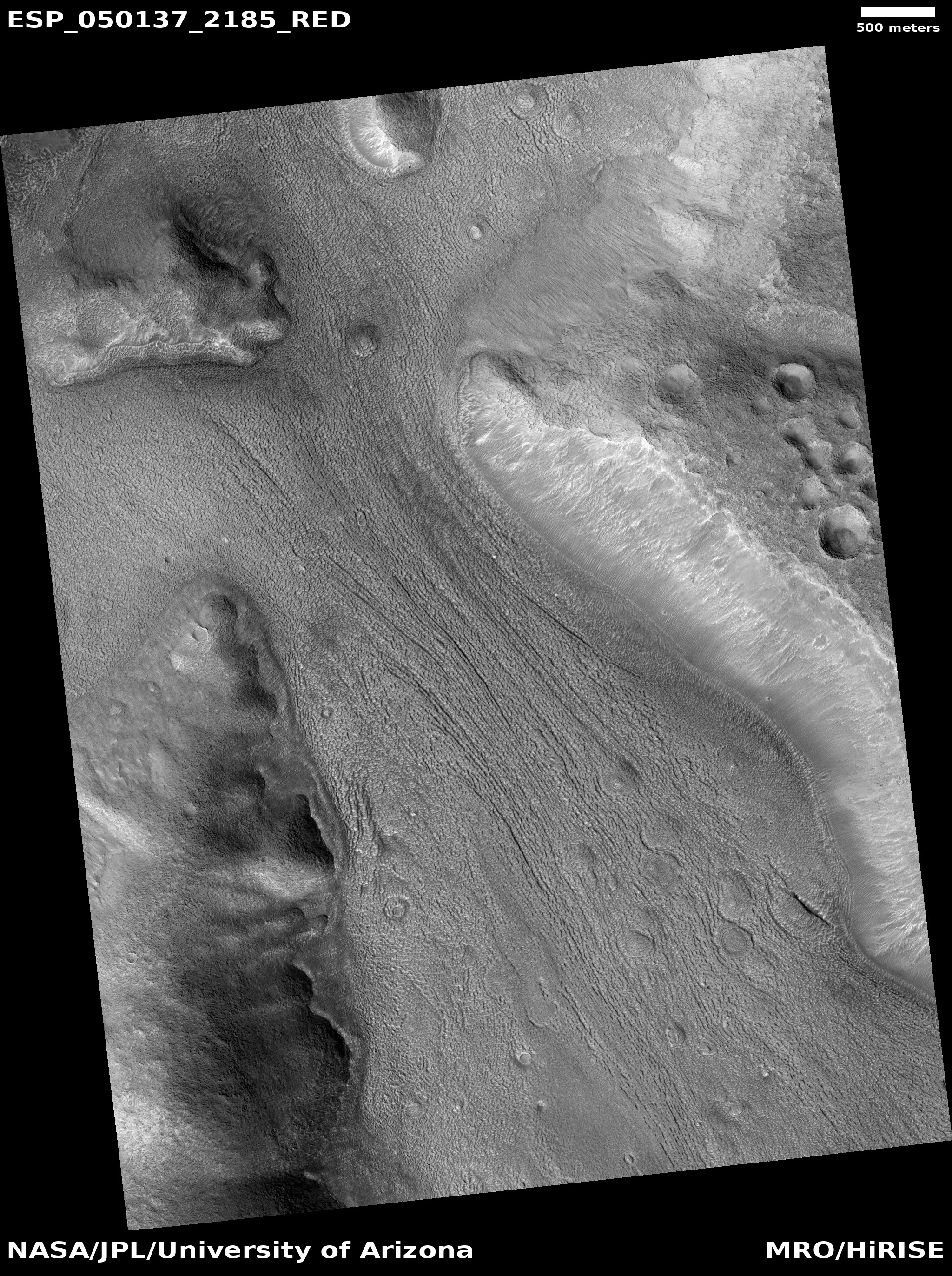
Lineated valley fill in valley, as seen by HiRISE under HiWish program Linear valley flow is ice covered by debris. Location is Ismenius Lacus quadrangle.

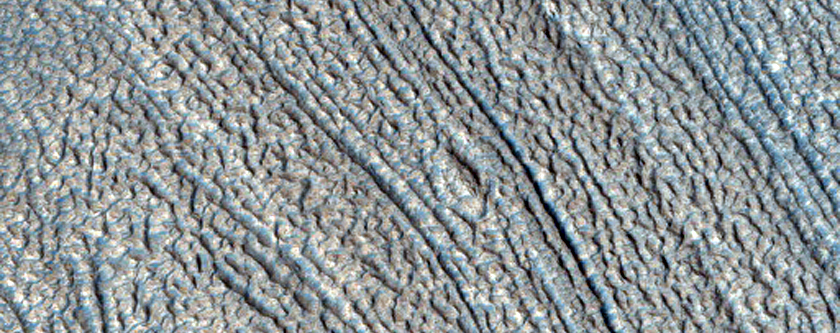
Close, color view of lineated valley fill, as seen by HiRISE under HiWish program

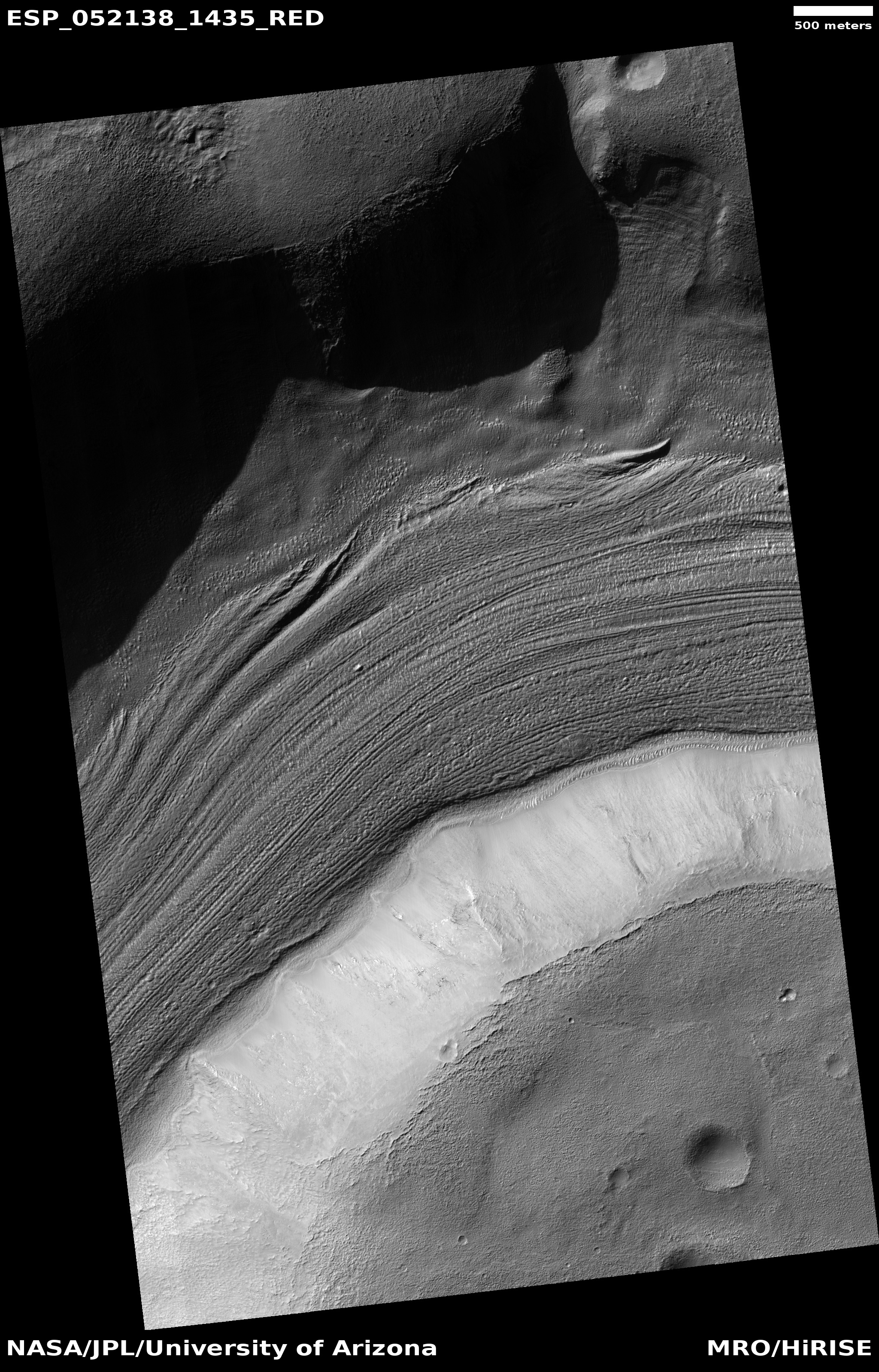
Lineated valley fill, as seen by HiRISE under HiWish program Image located in Hellas quadrangle.

Lineated floor deposits began as lobate debris aprons (LDAs), which form as material leaves narrow mountain valleys and spreads out as an apron. By tracing the paths of the ridges on LDAs, researchers have come to believe that the curved ridges characteristic of lobate debris aprons straighten out to form the more or less straight ridges of LVF.

In the regions where LVF and LDAs occur, many craters have concentric crater fill: large ridges and other surfaces nicknamed brain terrain, after the surface corrugations of the human brain.

The study of lineated valley fill and other features related to debris-covered ice has been greatly aided by the abundance of data received from Mars orbiting instruments. Excellent images have been obtained from THEMIS, MOC, CTX, and HiRISE. Detailed altimetry was collected by MOLA.

The Mars Reconnaissance Orbiter's Shallow Radar gave a strong reflection from the top and base of LDAs, meaning that pure water ice made up the bulk of the formation (between the two reflections), strong evidence that the LDAs in Hellas Planitia are glaciers covered with a thin layer of rocks. Since lineated valley terrain is derived from lobate debris aprons, it probably contains buried ice—at least in places.

== Connection to past climate ==
Studies of LDAs and LVF give evidence that there have been multiple episodes of glaciation on Mars, including ones that produced glaciers nearing a kilometre in thickness. These ice ages are related to major climate shifts caused by major variations in axial tilt. Earth's rather large moon prevents large changes in its tilt. The two moons of Mars are tiny. So Mars undergoes large periods when its ice cap receives more direct sunlight. During this time ice in the cap sublimates, and thick snow falls in mid-latitudes — the zones where concentric crater fill, lineated valley fill and lobate debris aprons are common. The distribution of craters on LVF indicates a late Amazonian age for at least some areas.

== Where located ==
Lineated valley fill is common in the middle latitudes, especially near the northern dichotomy boundary. The Nilosyrtis Mensae, Protonilus Mensae and Deuteronilus Mensae bear many examples of LVF. Ismenius Lacus quadrangle and Hellas quadrangle contain many valleys displaying lineated valley fill.

LVF and other ice-related forms are collectively known as fretted terrain, which includes winding and straight valleys with isolating plateaus and mesas.

== Importance of lineated valley fill ==
Studies of lineated valley fill have added evidence that the climate of Mars has undergone many large changes in the past.

At times there is snow, and at times the snow may melt. The resulting small areas of liquid water cause weathering of the rocks and may provide a favourable environment for life. Understanding lineated valley fill and other manifestations of buried ice will allow future colonists to find sources of water.

Reull Vallis, as pictured below, displays such deposits. Sometimes the lineated floor deposits show a chevron pattern which is further evidence of movement. The picture below taken with HiRISE of Reull Vallis shows these patterns.

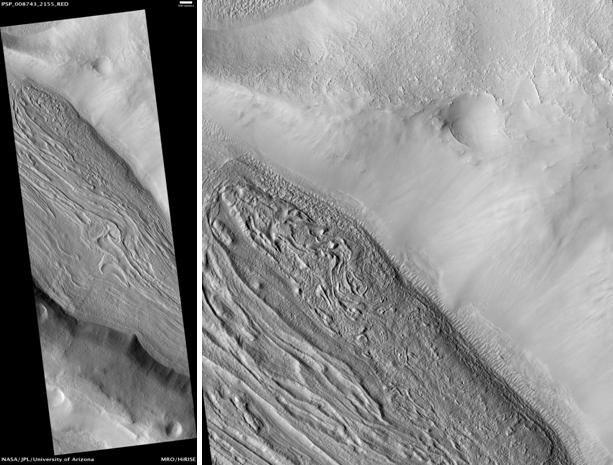
Lineated valley fill in Coloe Fossae, seen by HiRISE. Scale bar is 500 meters long. Image located in Ismenius Lacus quadrangle.

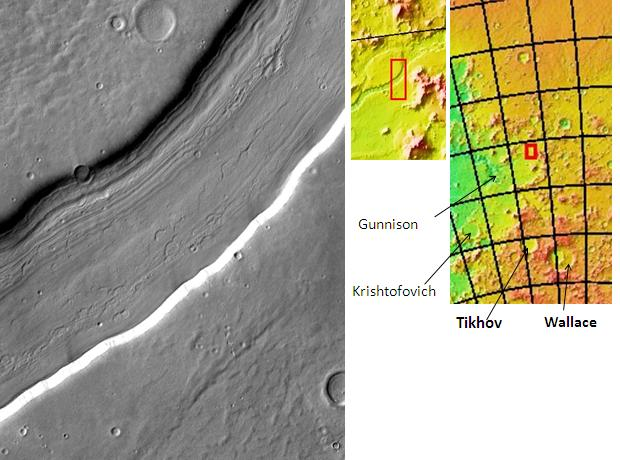
Lineated floor deposits in Reull Vallis, seen by THEMIS. Click on image to see relationship to other features. Image located in Hellas quadrangle.
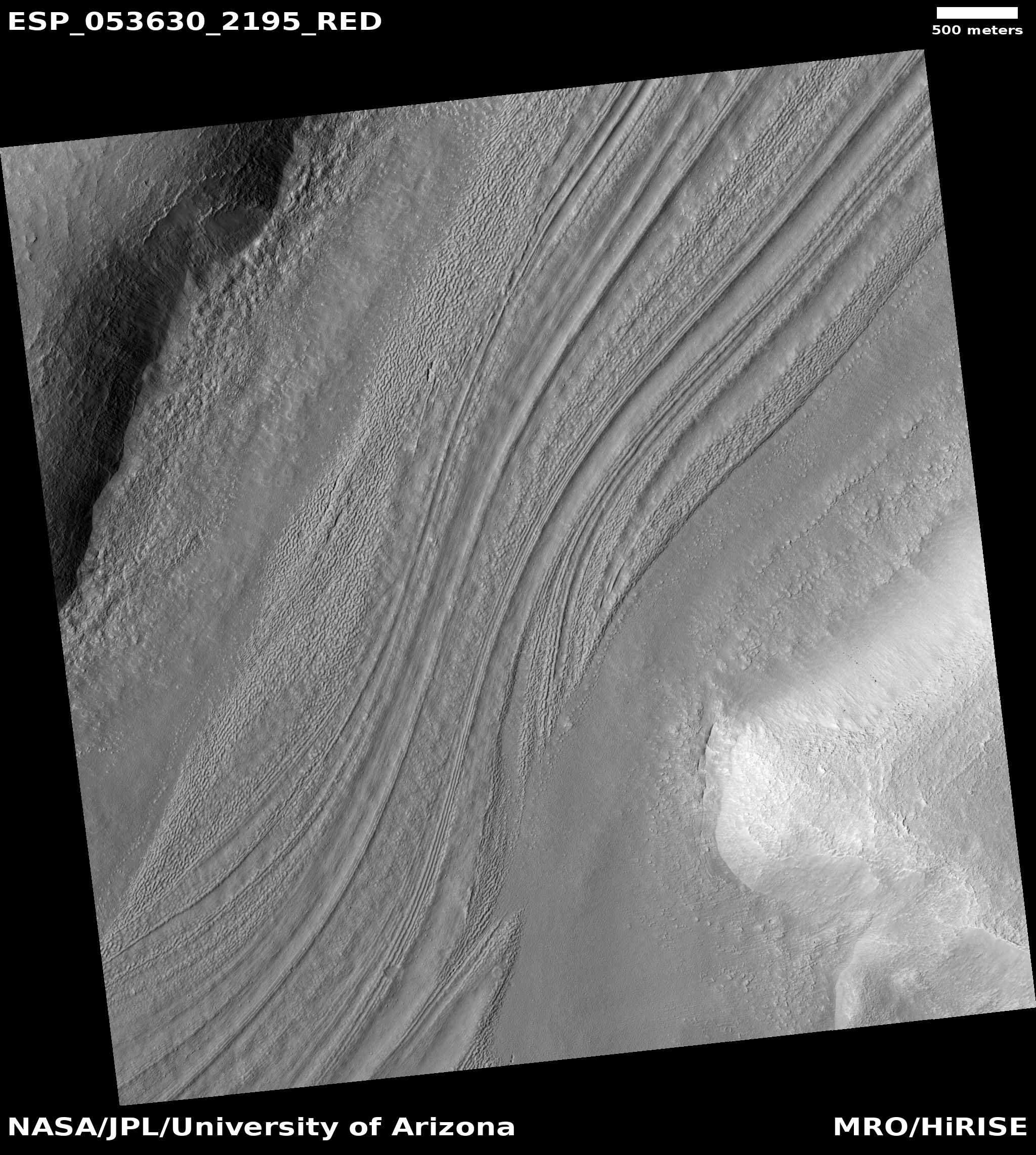
Wide view of Lineated Valley Fill, as seen by HiRISE under HiWish program Location is Ismenius Lacus quadrangle.

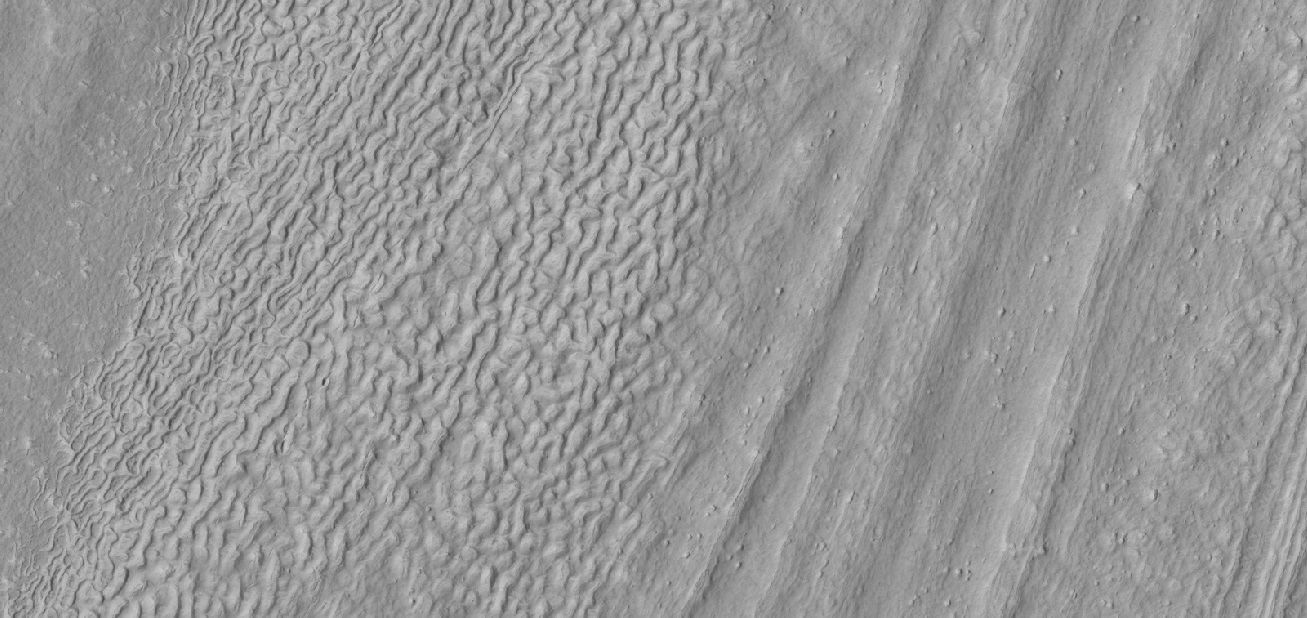
Close view of surface of Lineated Valley fill, as seen by HiRISE under HiWish program Location is Ismenius Lacus quadrangle. Image shows open and closed brain terrain.

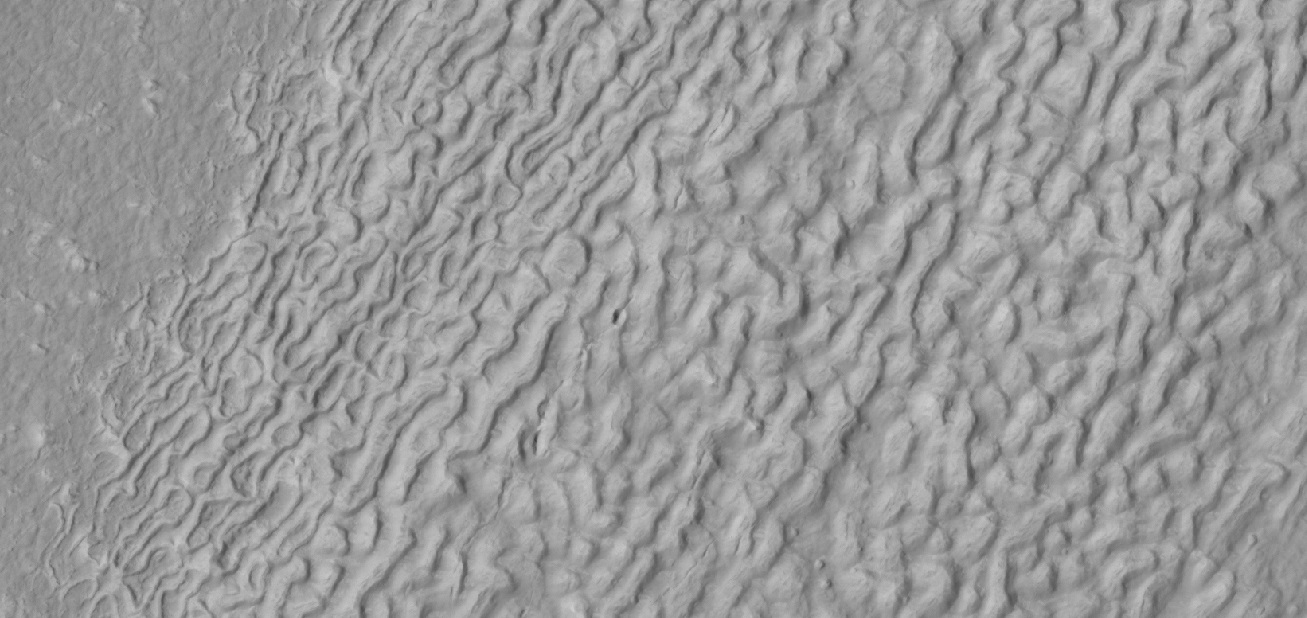
Enlarged view of brain terrain on the surface of Lineated Valley Fill, as seen by HiRISE under HiWish program Location is Ismenius Lacus quadrangle.

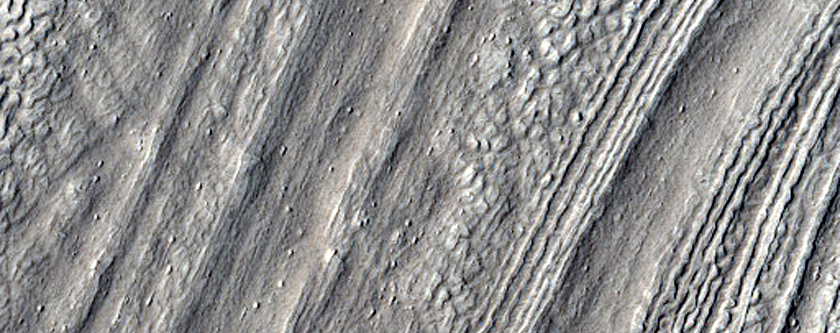
Close, color view of Lineated Valley Fill, as seen by HiRISE under HiWish program Location is Ismenius Lacus quadrangle.

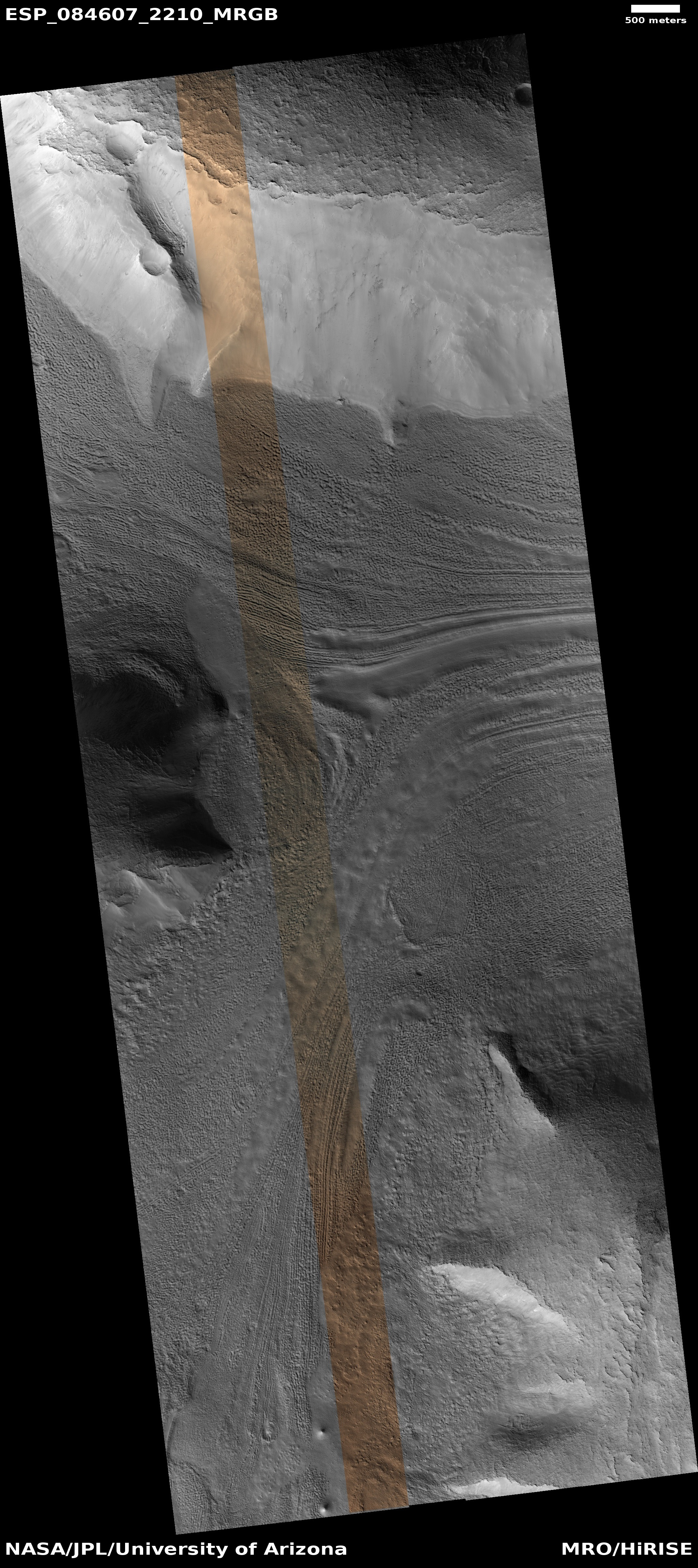
Lineated valley fill in valley, as seen by HiRISE under HiWish program. Linear valley flow is ice covered by debris.

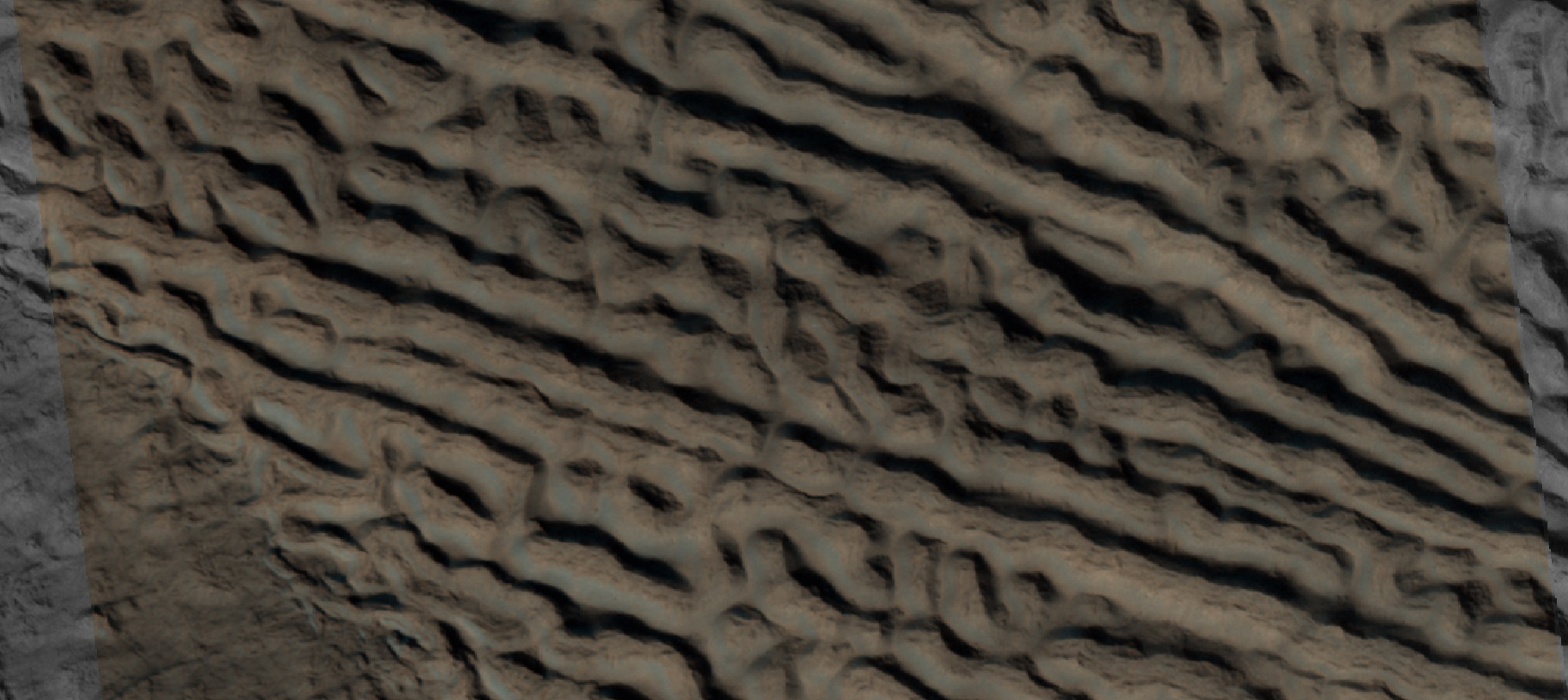
Close view of lineated valley fill (LVF) in valley, as seen by HiRISE under HiWish program. Linear valley flow is ice covered by debris. Picture is about 1 km wide.

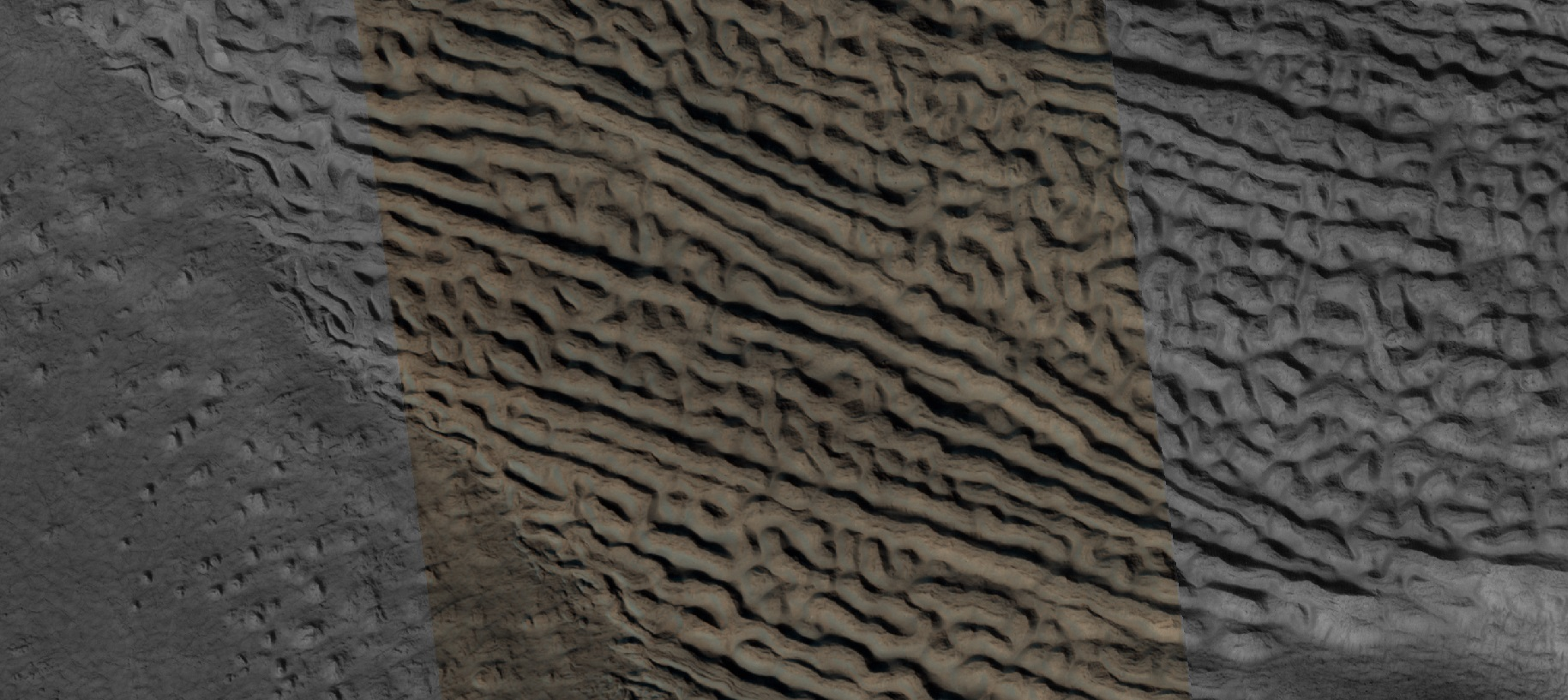
Close view of lineated valley fill (LVF) in valley, as seen by HiRISE under HiWish program. Linear valley flow is ice covered by debris.

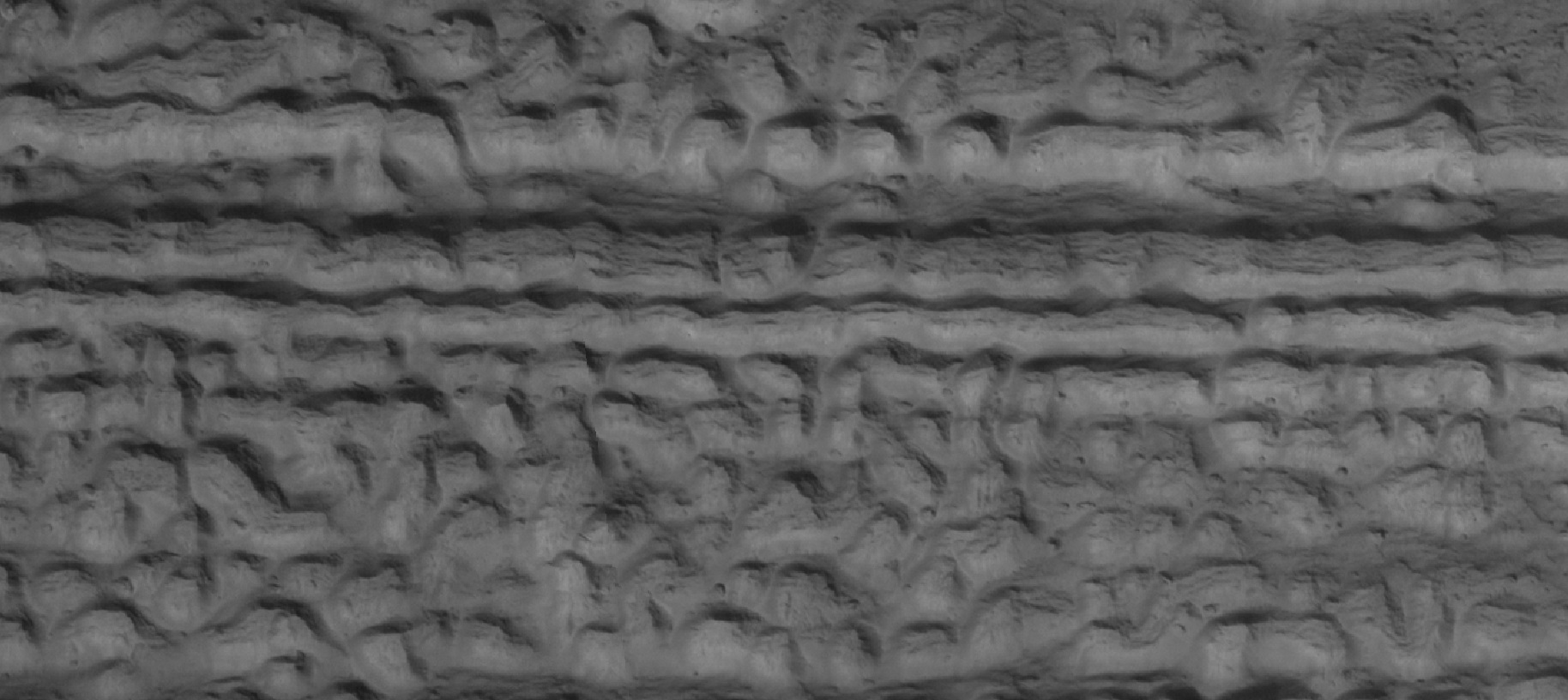
Close view of lineated valley fill (LVF) in valley, as seen by HiRISE under HiWish program. Linear valley flow is ice covered by debris.

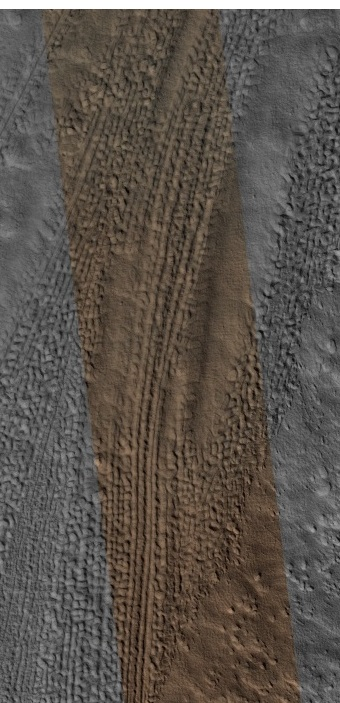
Lineated valley fill in valley, as seen by HiRISE under HiWish program. Linear valley flow is ice covered by debris.

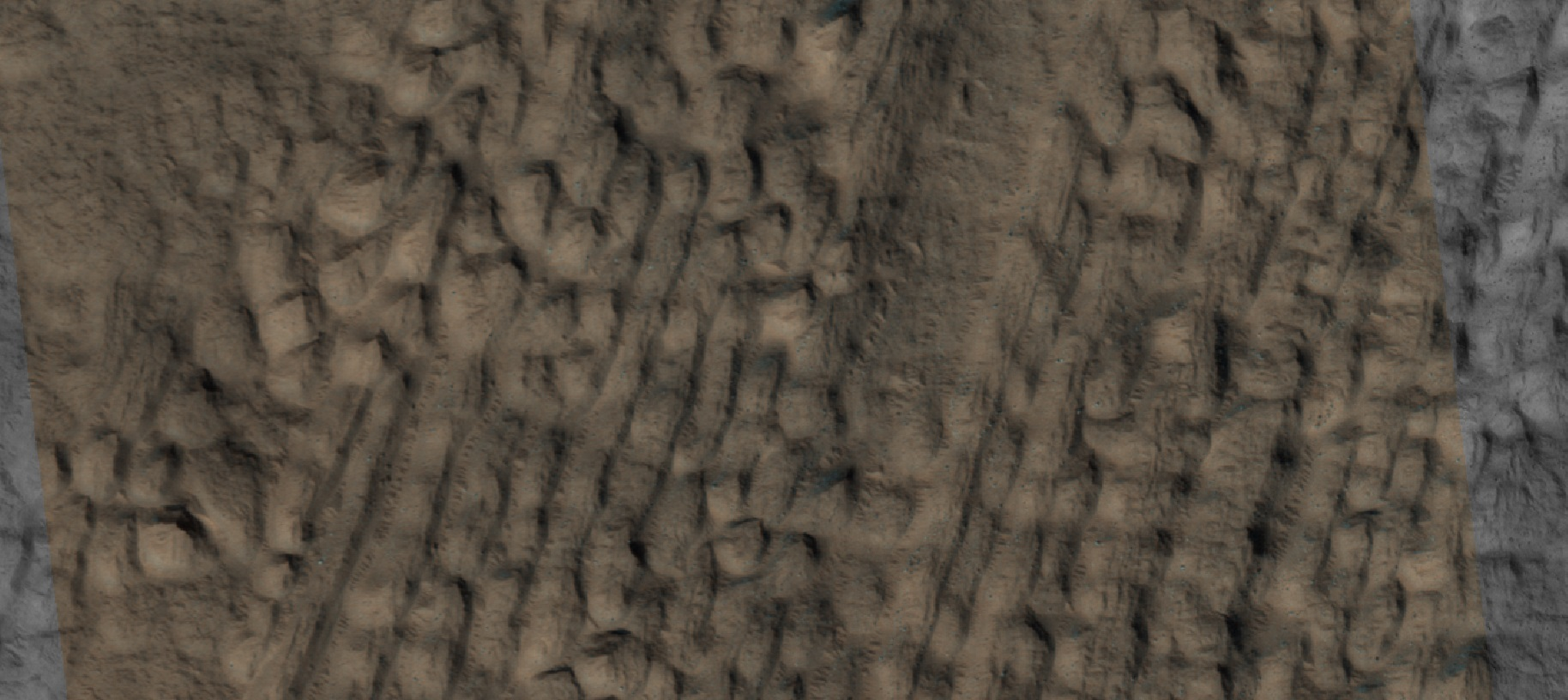
Close view of lineated valley fill (LVF) in valley, as seen by HiRISE under HiWish program. Linear valley flow is ice covered by debris. Picture is about 1 km wide.

== See also ==
- Geology of Mars
- Lobate debris apron
- Concentric crater fill
- Glacier
- Glaciers on Mars
- Protonilus Mensae
- Deuteronilus Mensae
- Nilosyrtis Mensae
