= Upper plains unit =

Surface features of Mars

The upper plains unit is the remnants of a 50-100 meter thick mantling that has been discovered in the mid-latitudes of the planet Mars. It was first investigated in the Deuteronilus Mensae (Ismenius Lacus quadrangle) region, but it occurs in other places as well. The remnants consist of sets of dipping layers in impact craters, in depressions, and along mesas. Sets of dipping layers may be of various sizes and shapes—some look like Aztec pyramids from Central America.

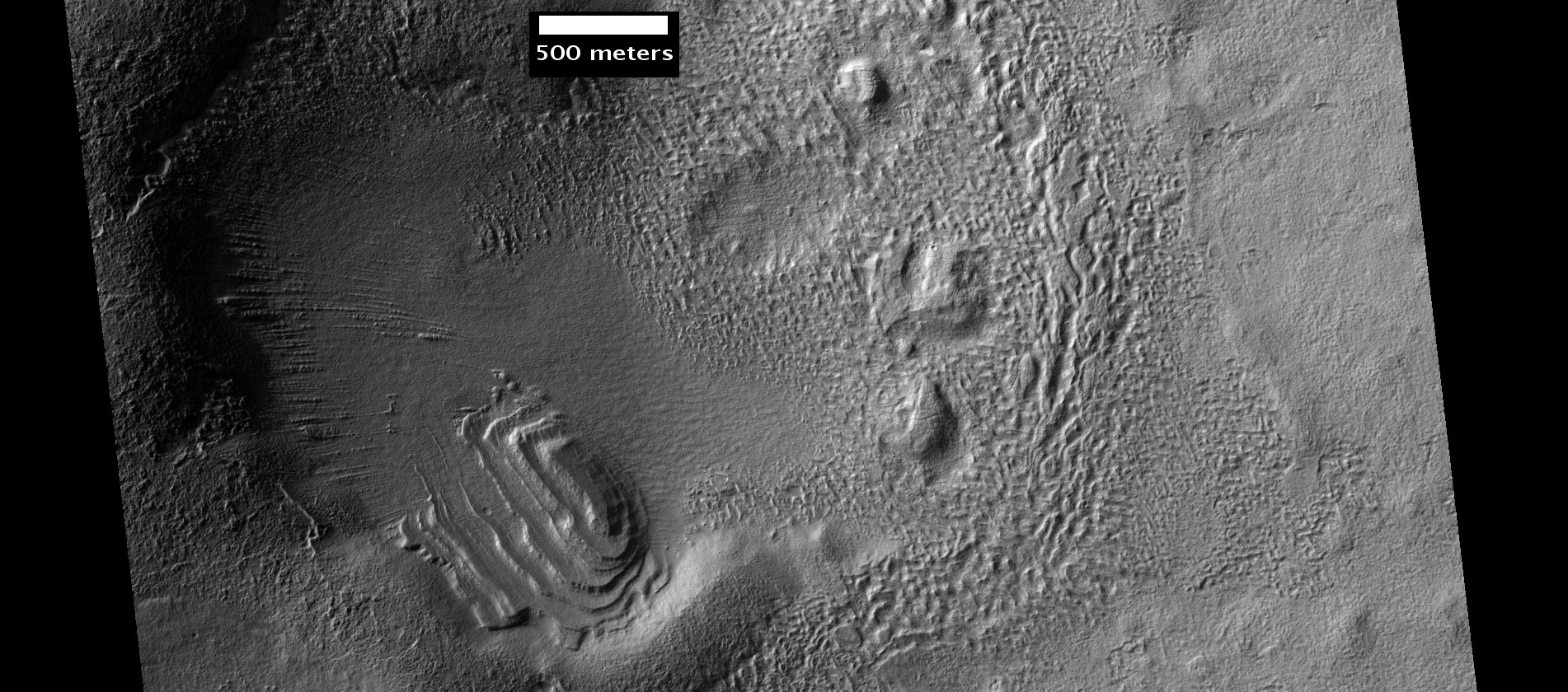
Layered structure in crater that is probably what is left of a layered unit that once covered a much larger area. Material for this unit fell from the sky as ice-coated dust. The picture was taken by HiRISE, under the HiWish program. Picture is from Hellas quadrangle.
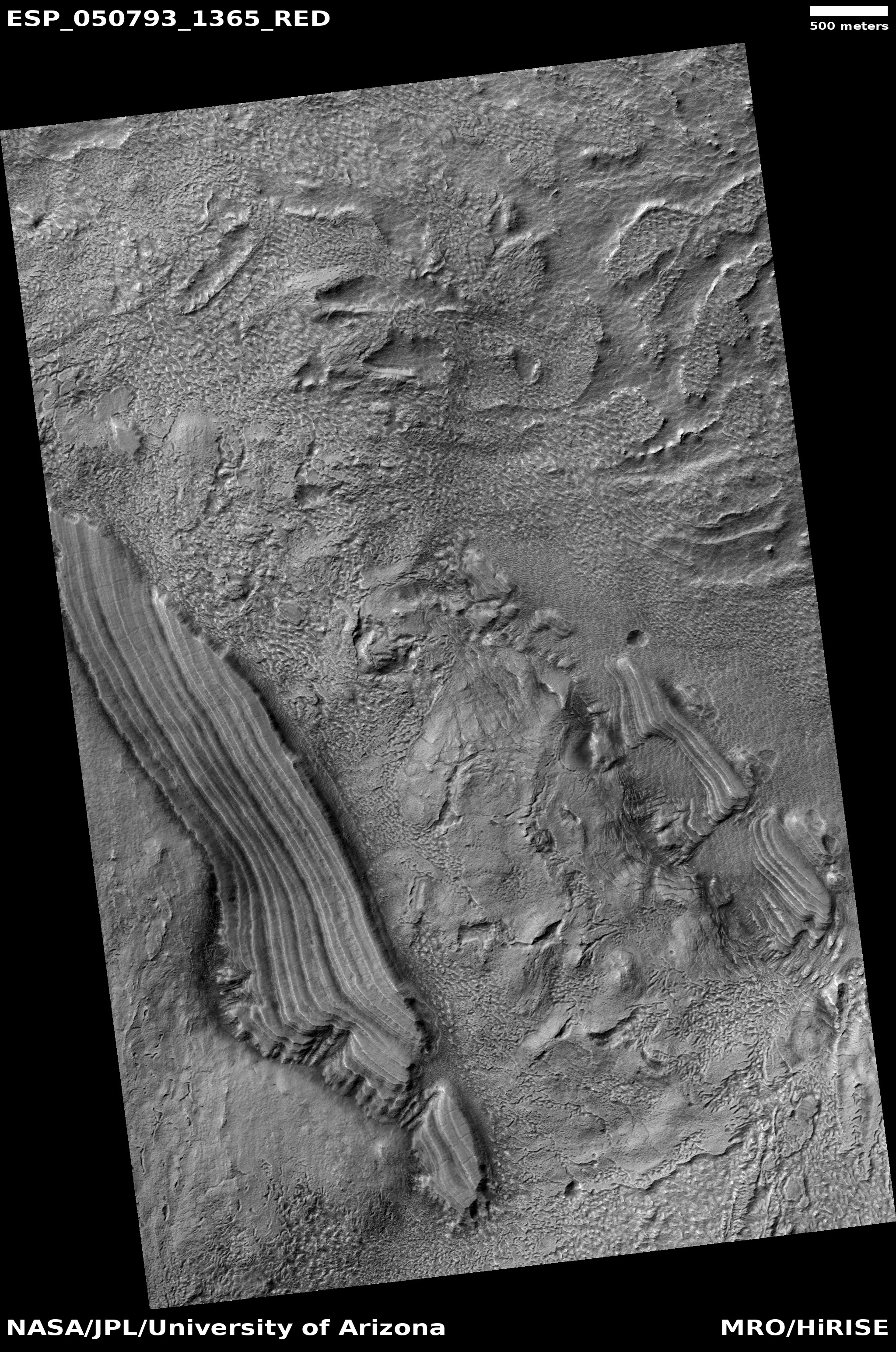
Tilted layers, as seen by HiRISE under HiWish program Location is Hellas quadrangle.

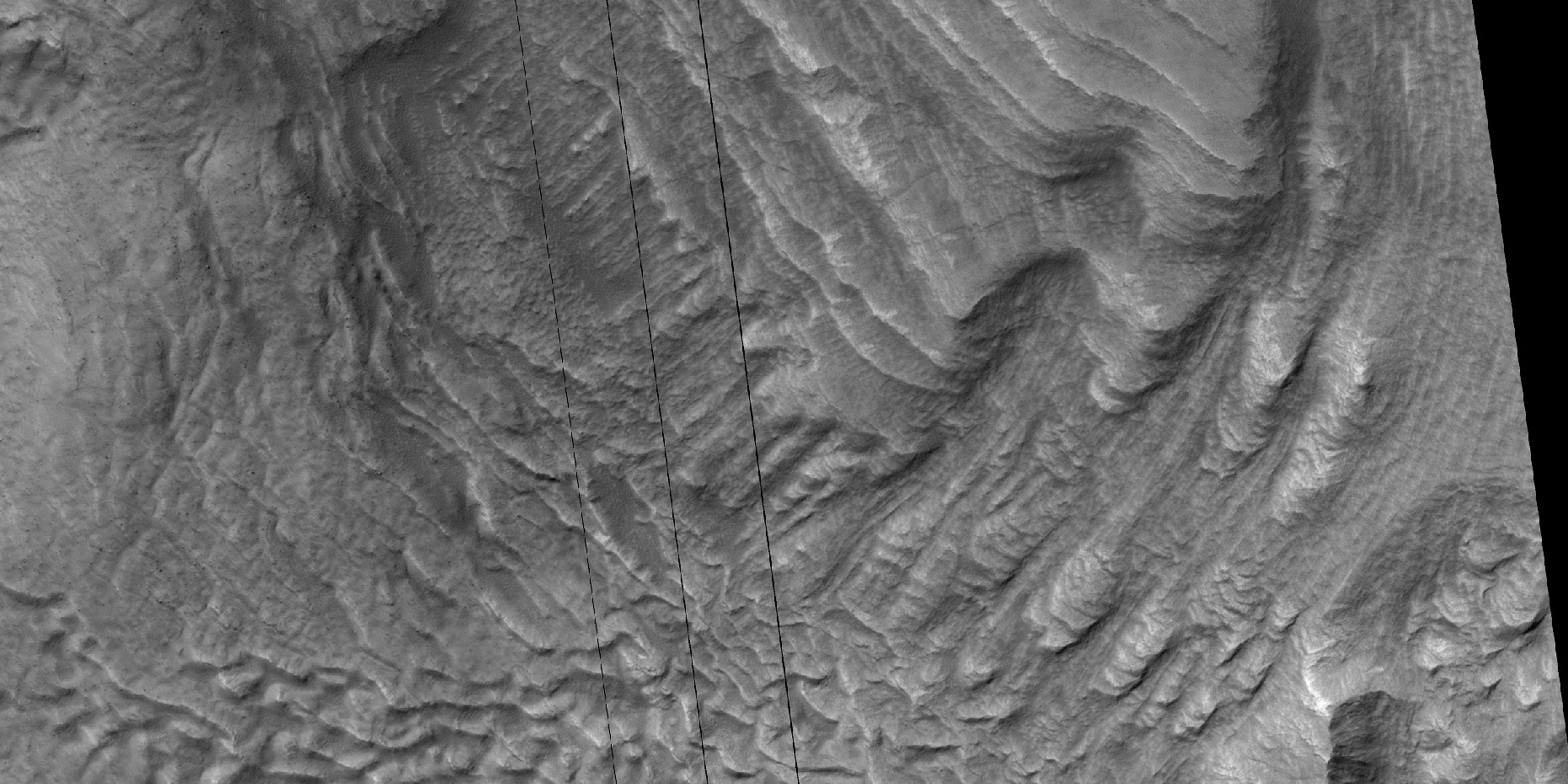
Tilted layers, as seen by HiRISE under HiWish program Location is Hellas quadrangle.

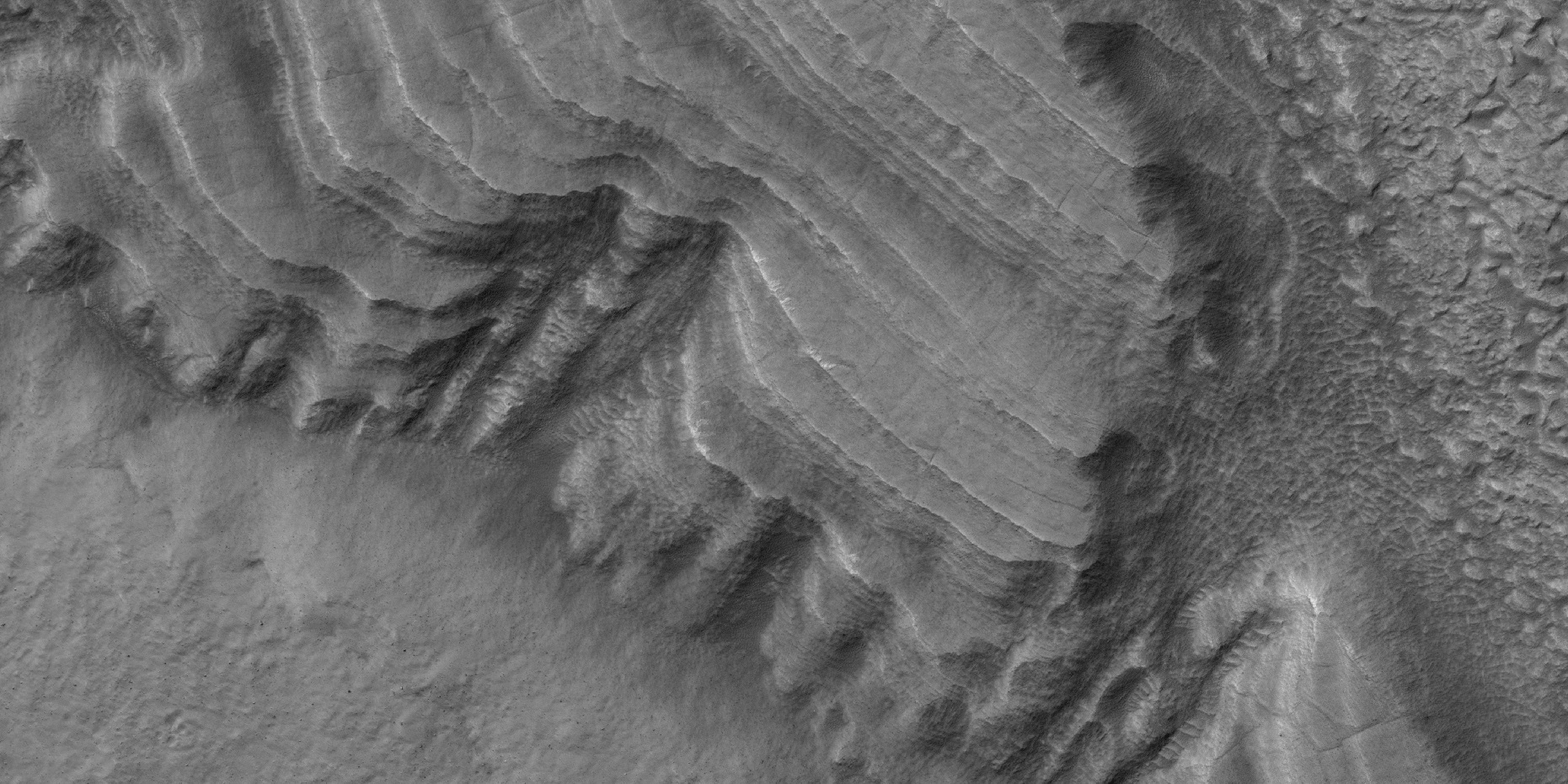
Tilted layers, as seen by HiRISE under HiWish program Location is Hellas quadrangle.
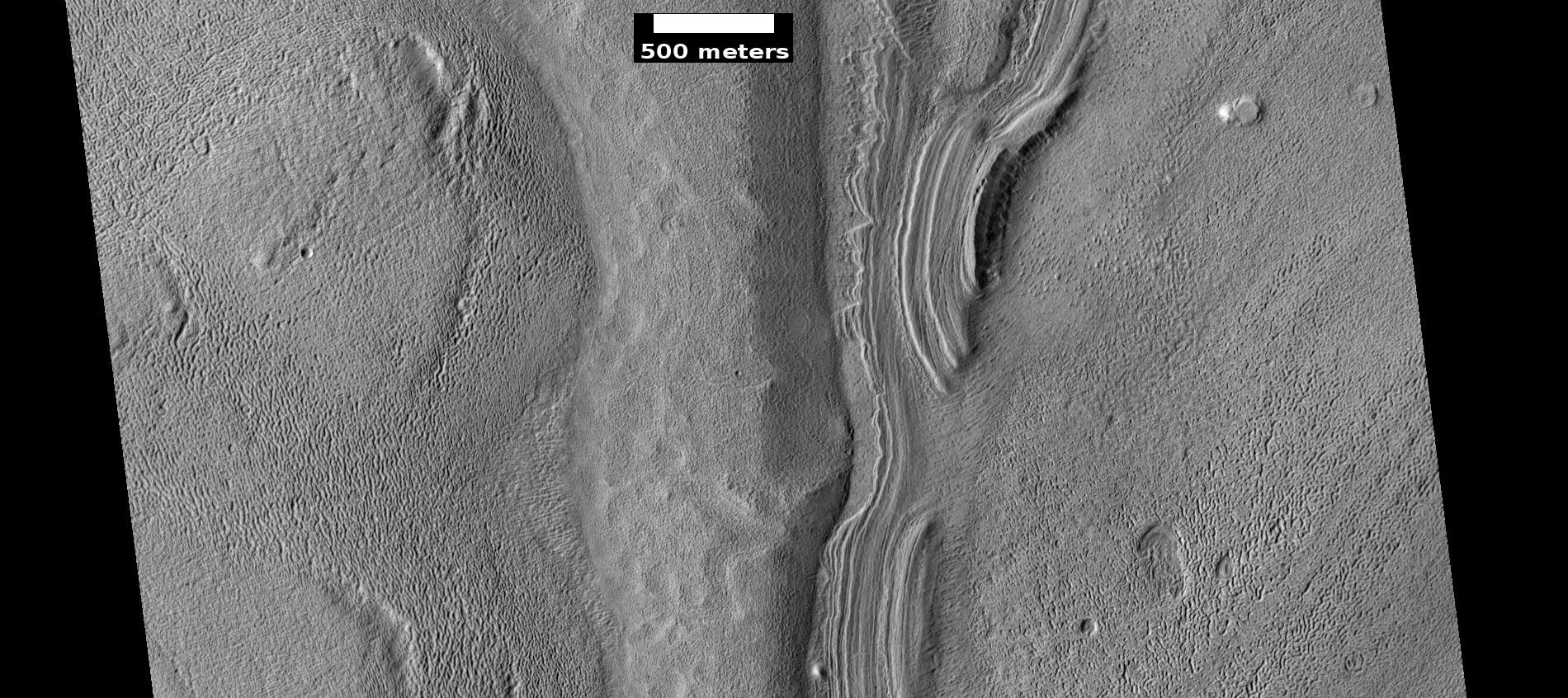
Dipping layers, as seen by HiRISE under HiWish program

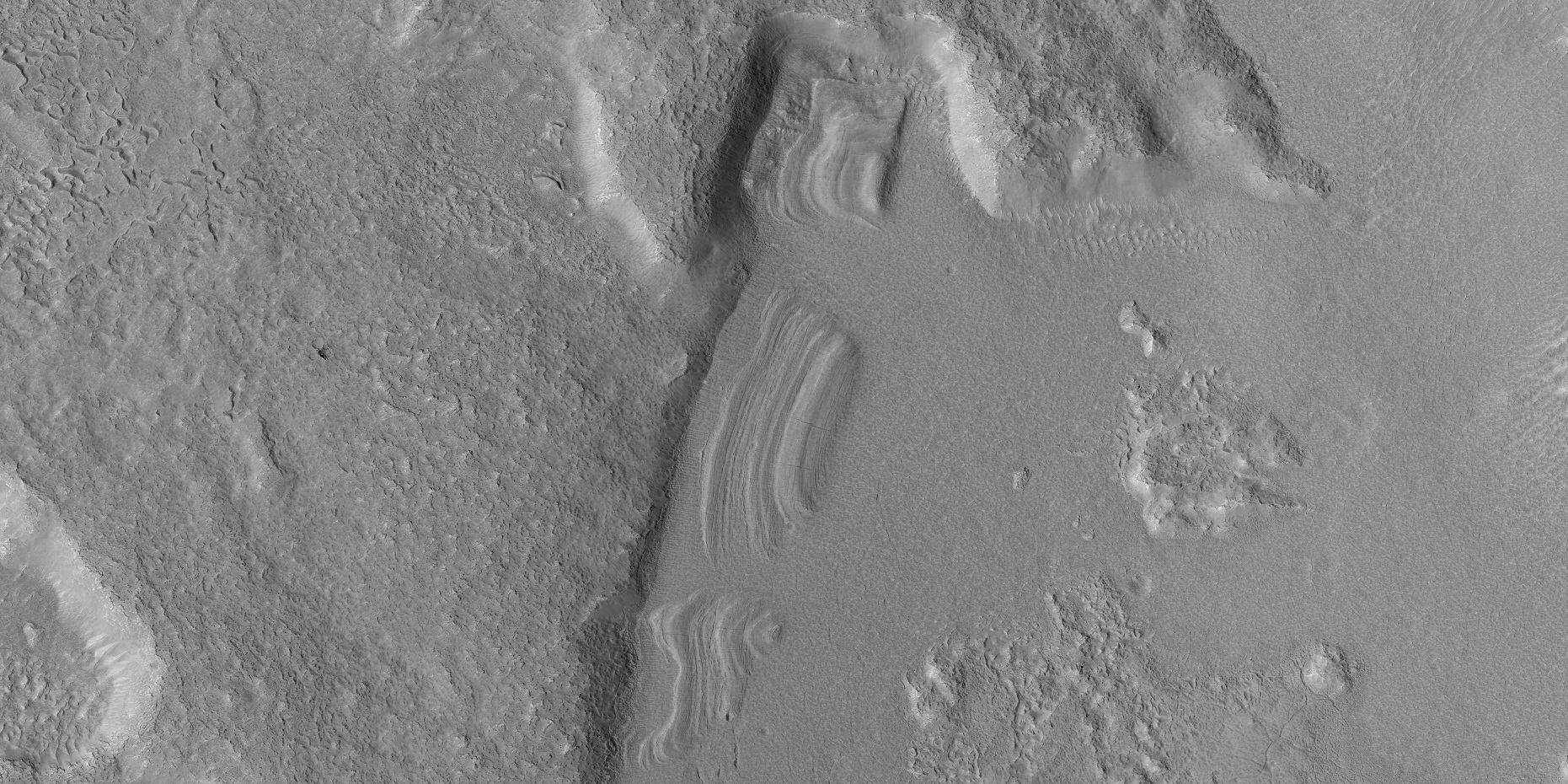
Close view of dipping layers along a mesa wall, as seen by HiRISE under HiWish program Location is Ismenius Lacus quadrangle.

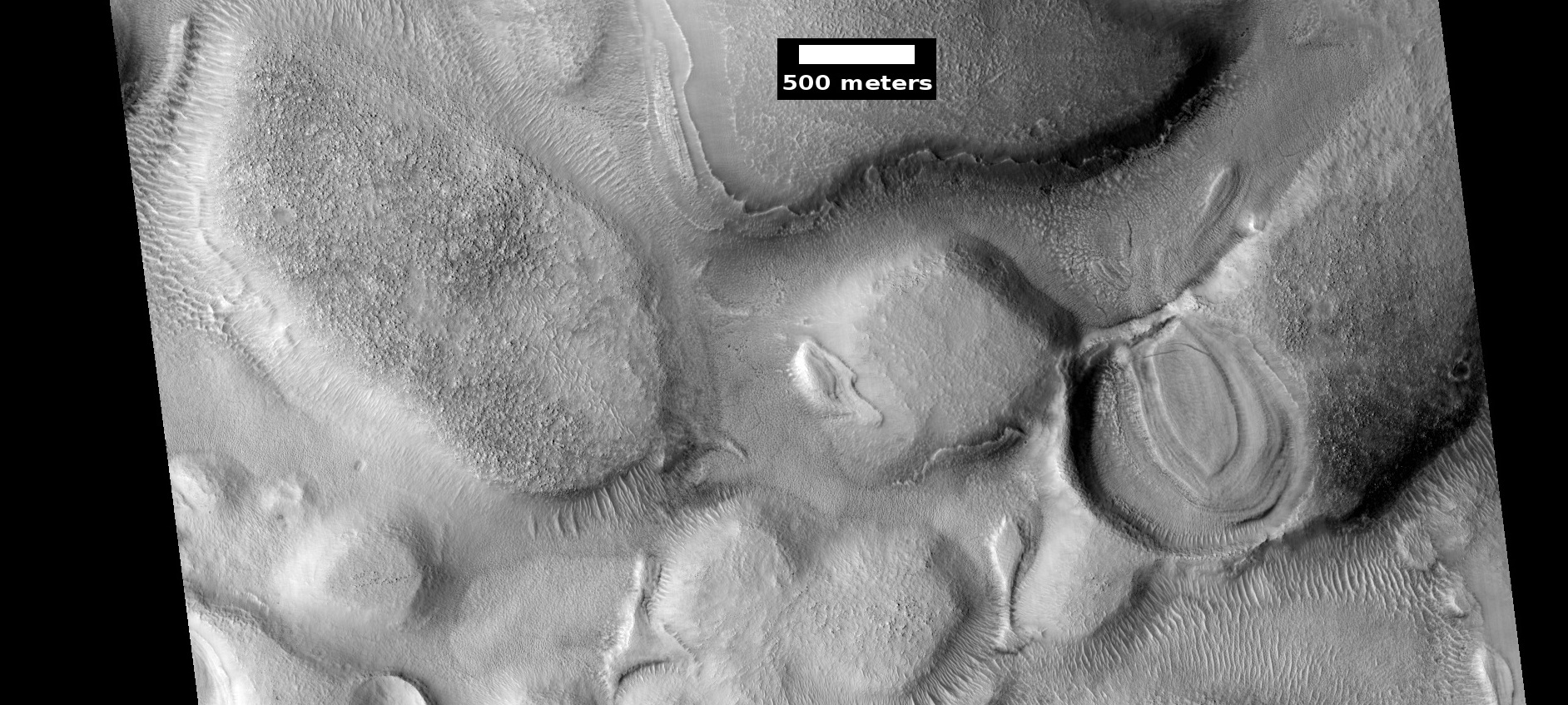
Dipping layers in a crater, as seen by HiRISE under HiWish program

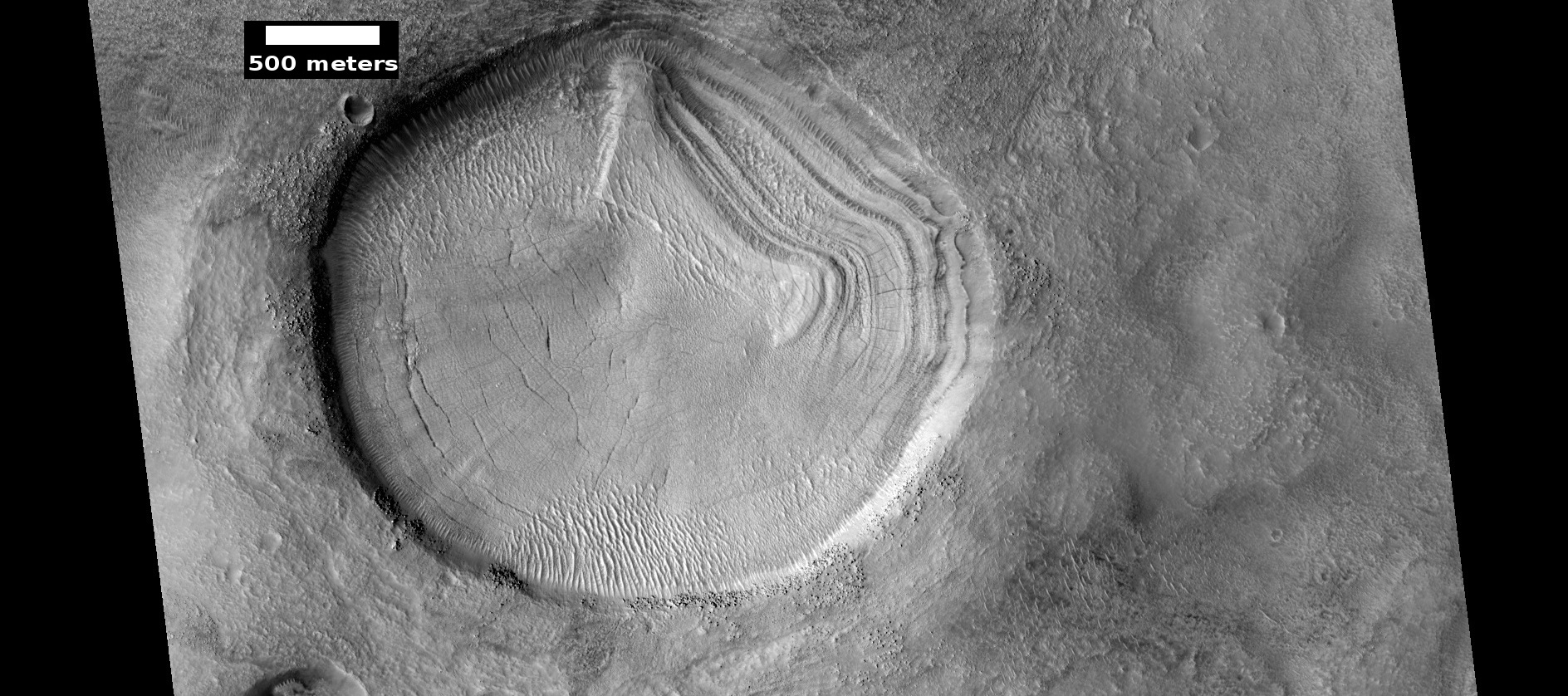
Layered features in crater, as seen by HiRISE under HiWish program

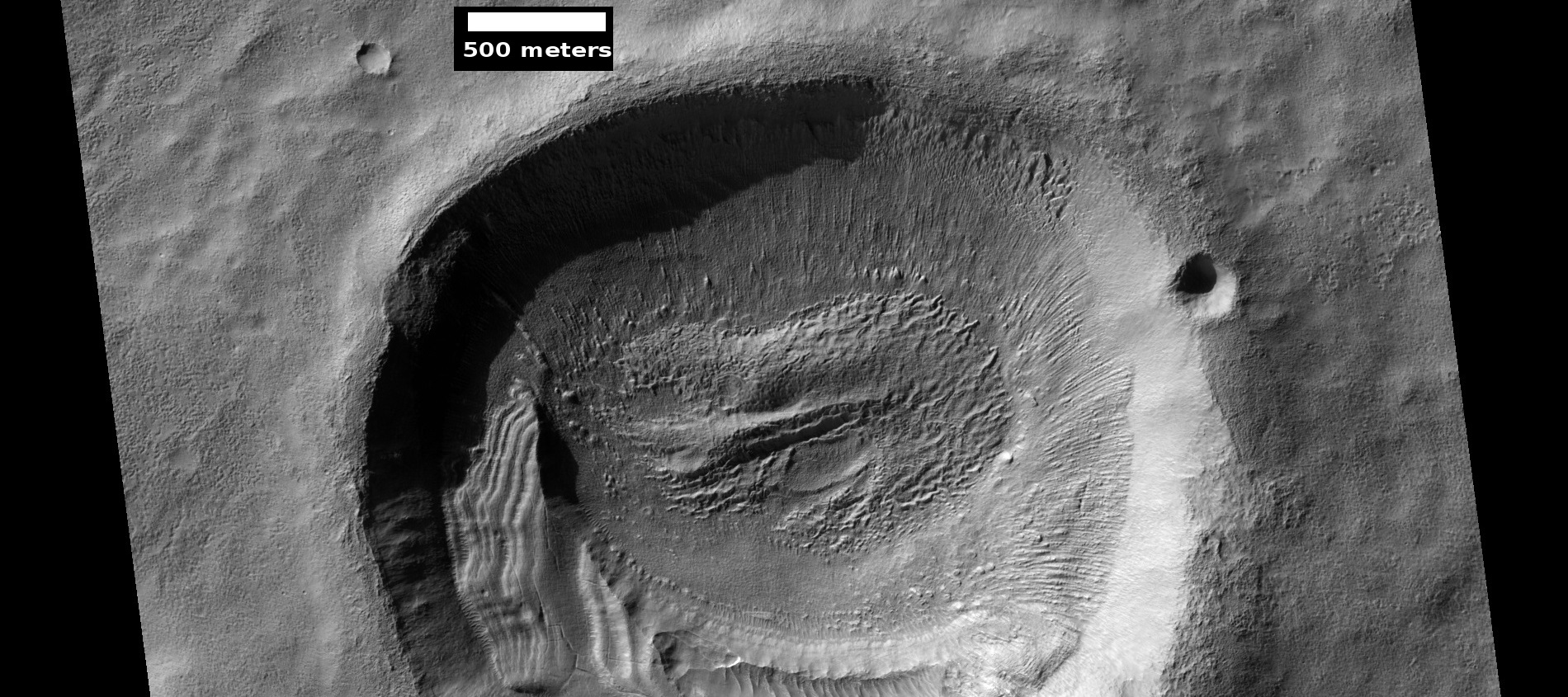
Layered feature in crater, as seen by HiRISE under the HiWish program

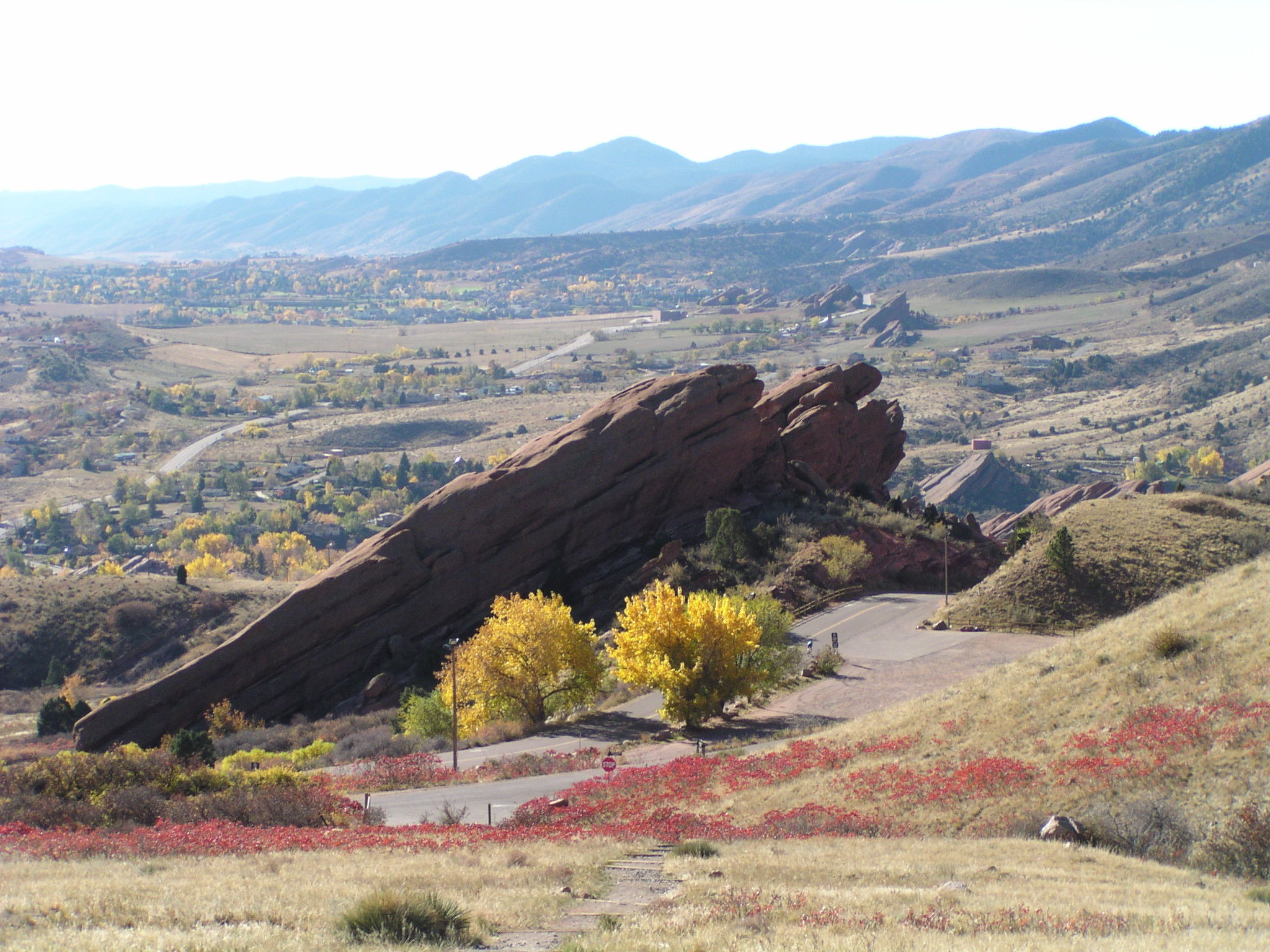
Layered feature in Red Rocks Park, Colorado. This has a different origin than ones on Mars, but it has a similar shape. Features in Red Rocks region were caused by uplift of mountains.

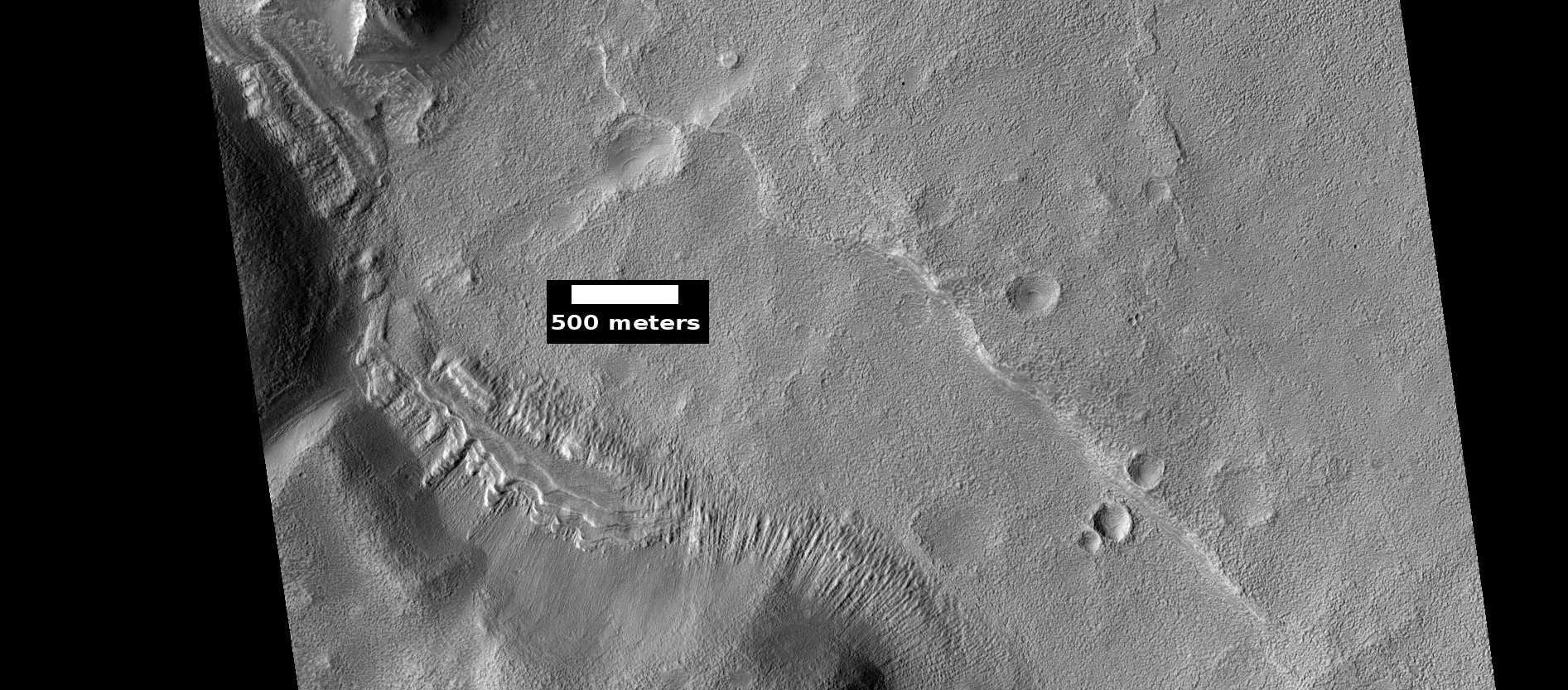
Dipping layers, as seen by HiRISE under HiWish program

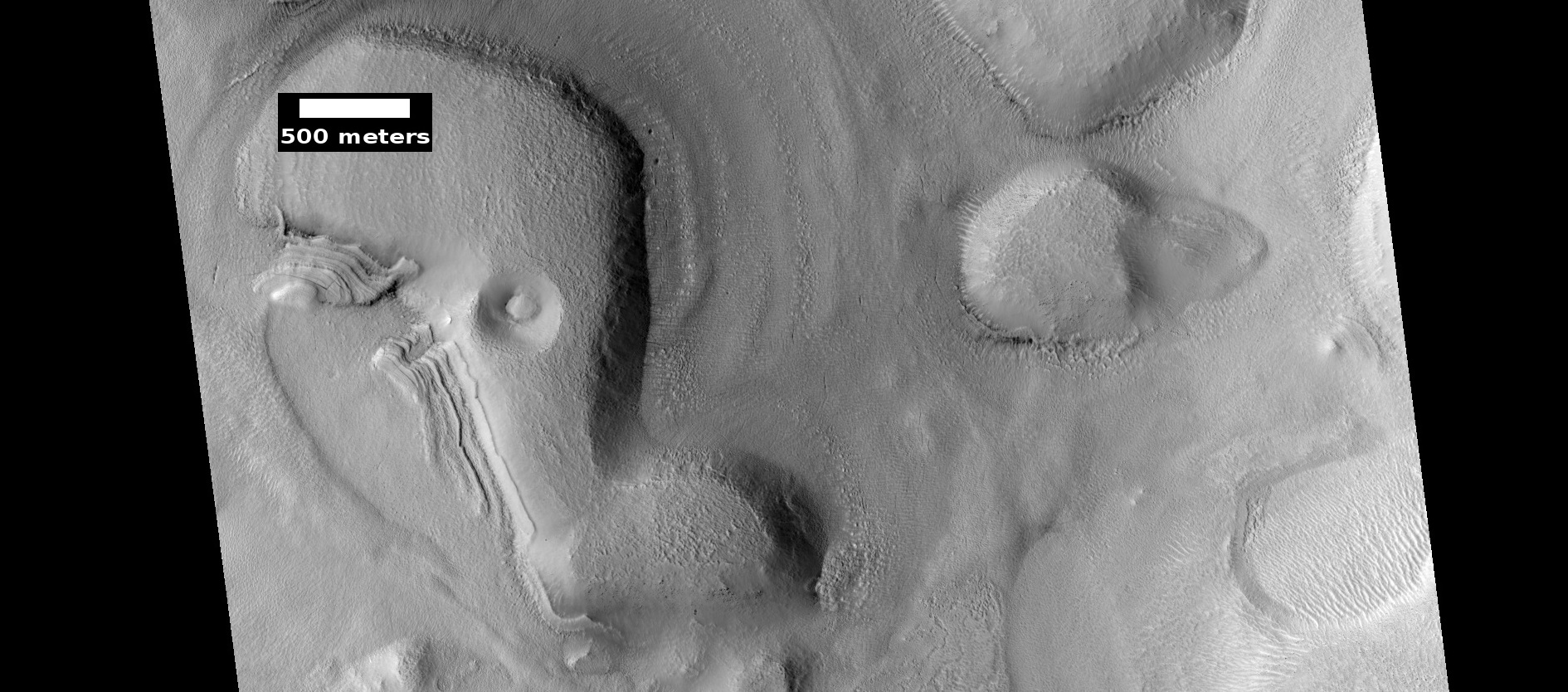
Layered structures, as seen by HiRISE under HiWish program

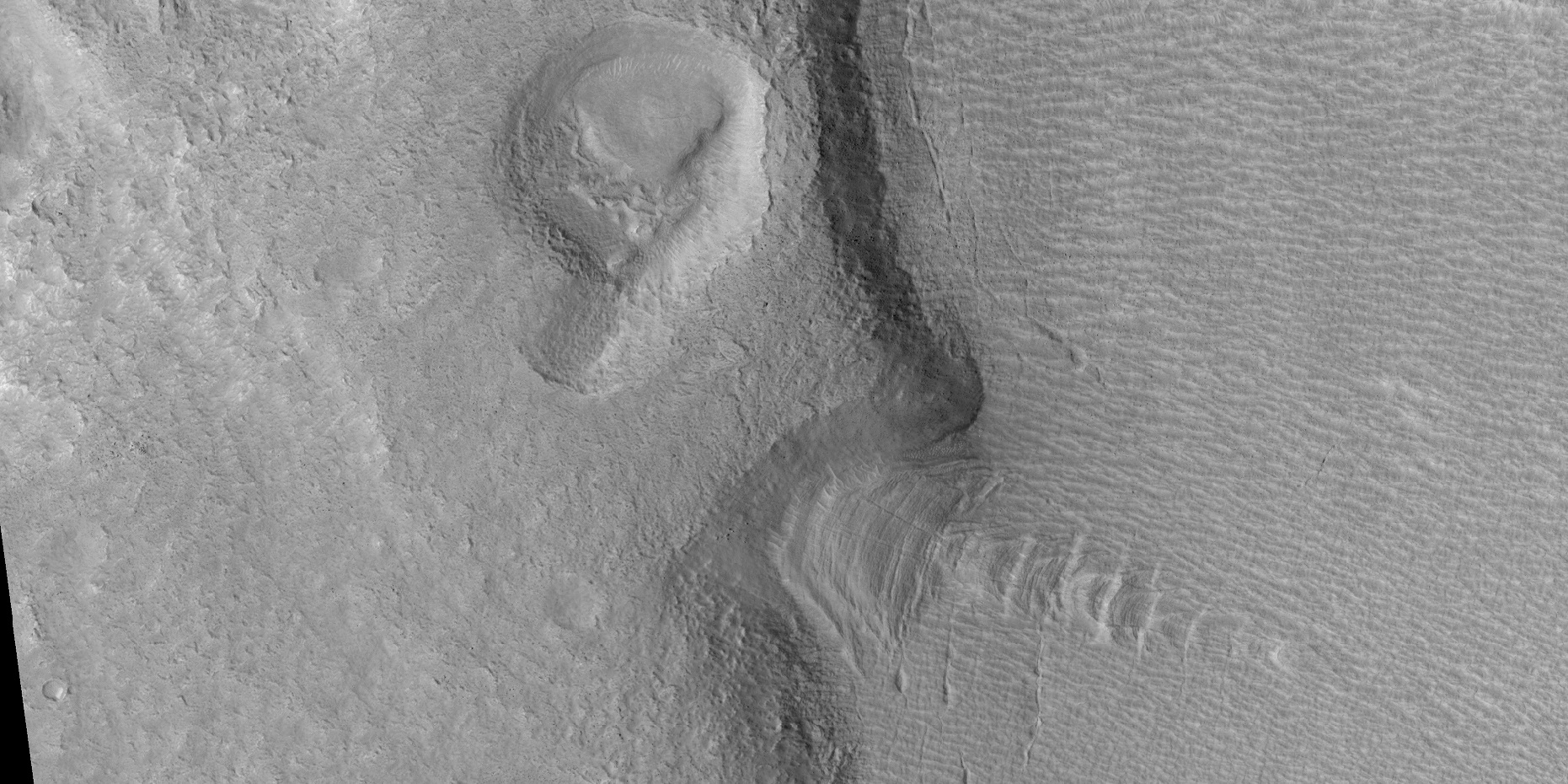
Dipping layers, as seen by HiRISE under HiWish program

This unit also degrades into brain terrain. Brain terrain is a region of maze-like ridges 3–5 meters high. Some ridges may consist of an ice core, so they may be sources of water for future colonists. Not all the details of brain terrain formation has been worked out. Brain terrain remains as one of the unsolved mysteries on Mars because we do not totally understand it.

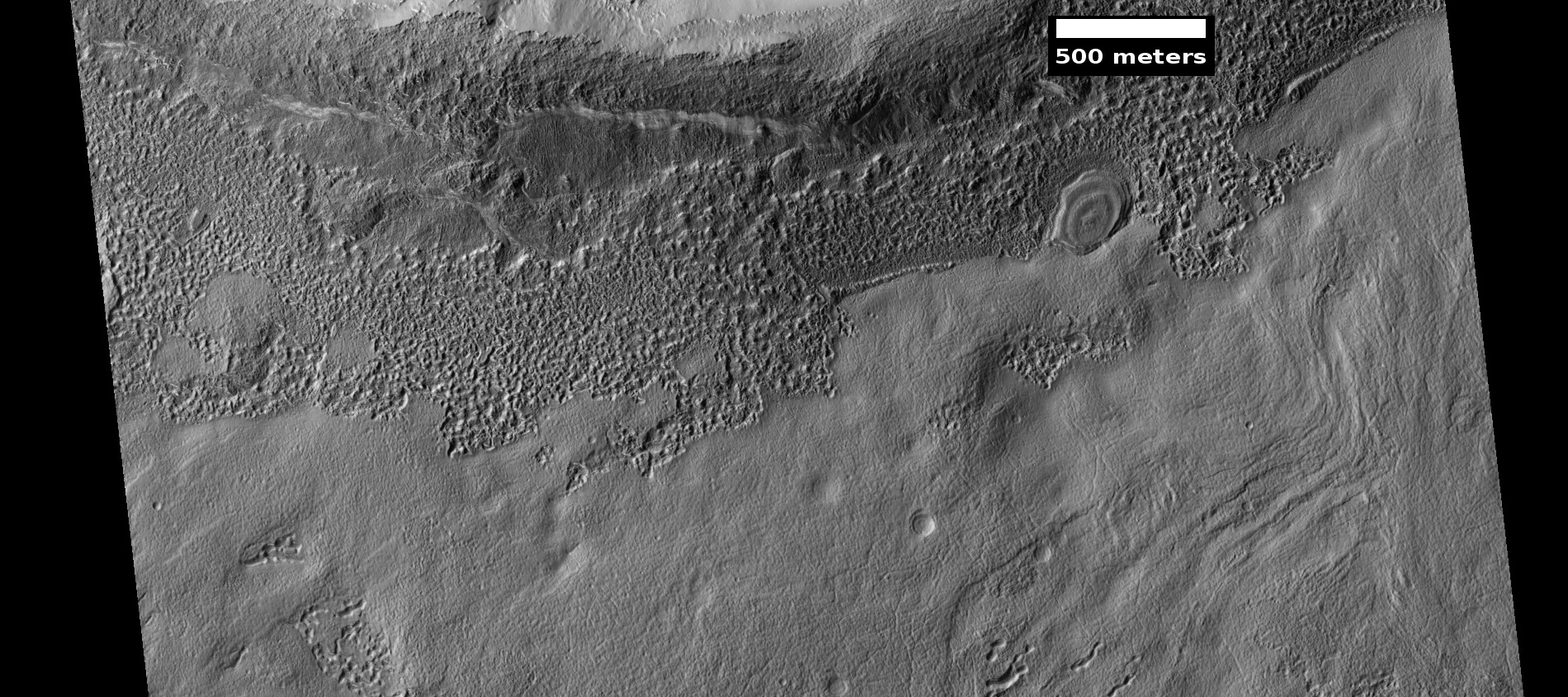
Small, layered structure, as seen by HiRISE under the HiWish program Picture also shows brain terrain forming. Brain terrain seems to start with pits that get longer and more complicated. Picture is from Hellas quadrangle.

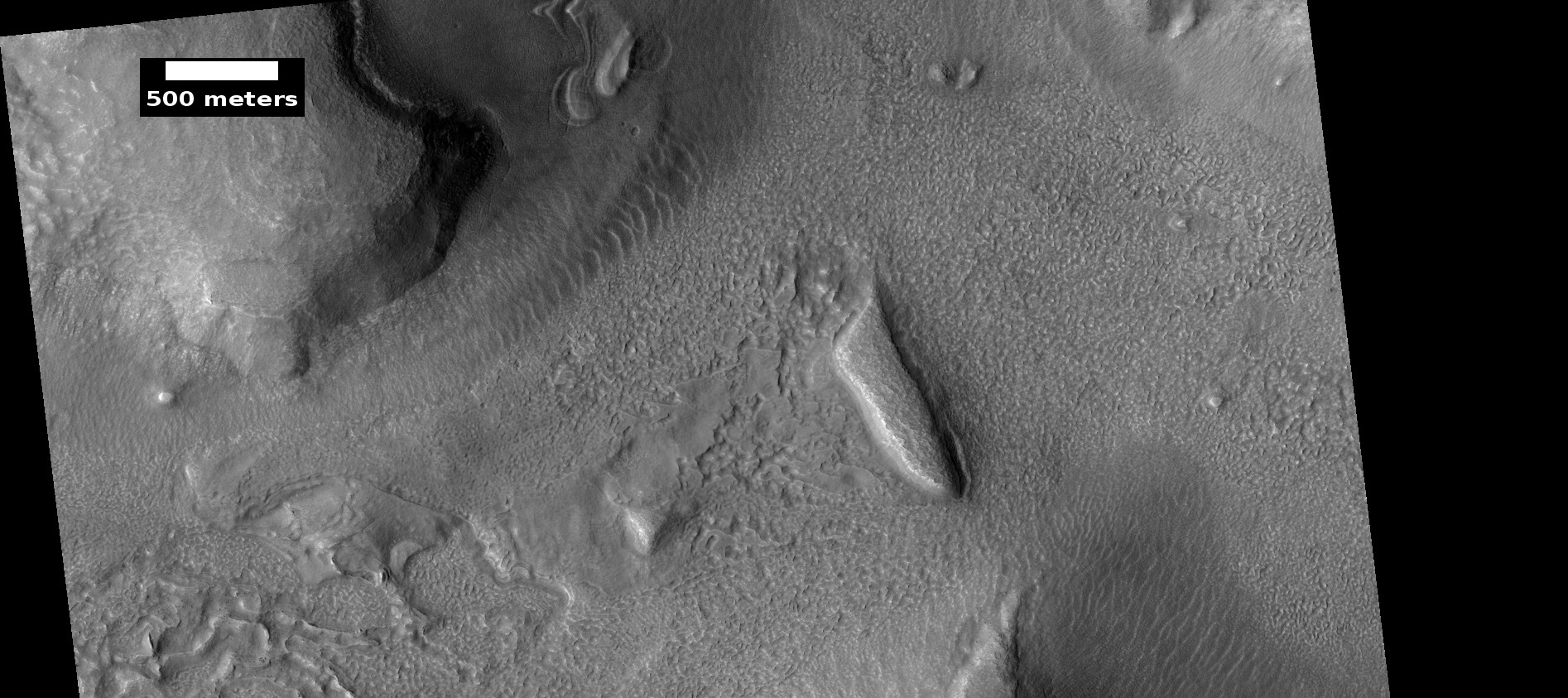
Layered features and brain terrain, as seen by HiRISE under HiWish program The upper plains unit often changes into brain terrain.

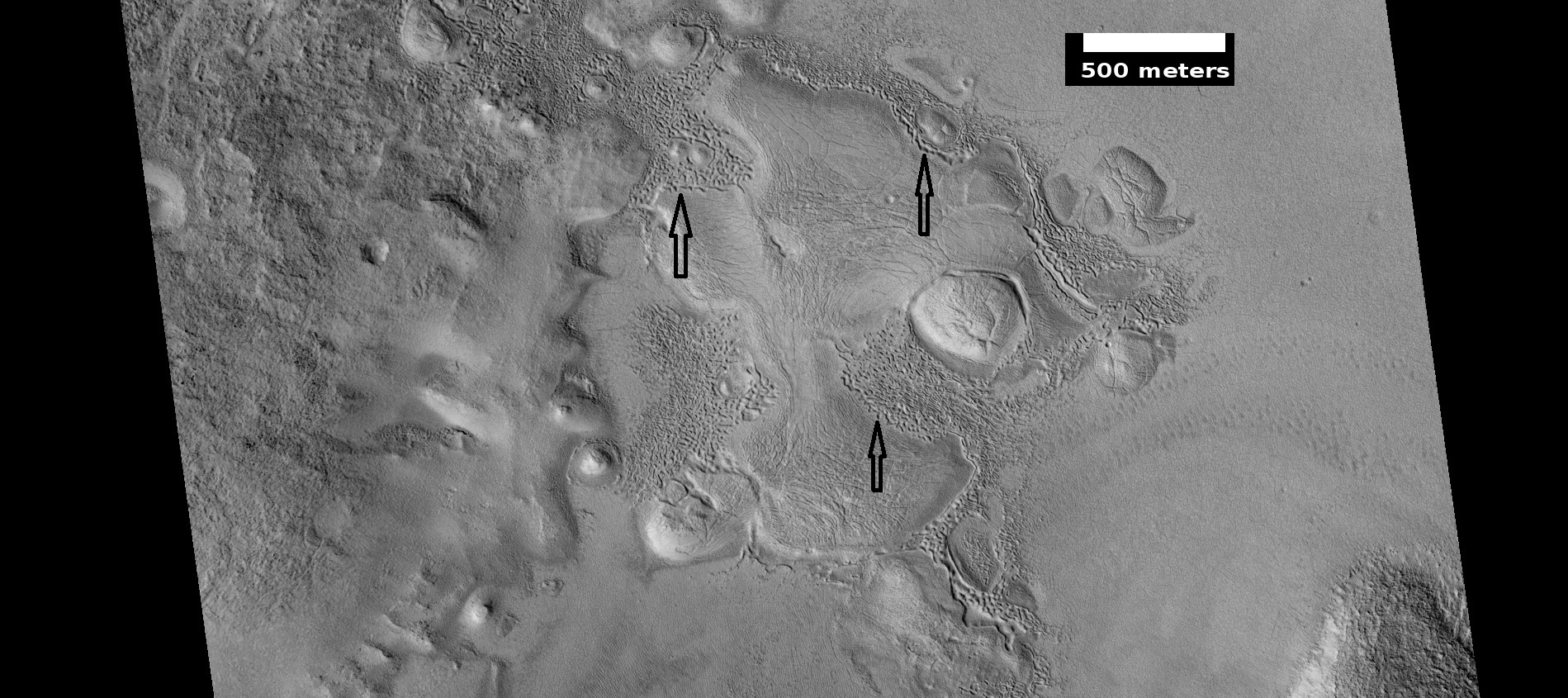
Brain terrain being formed from a thicker layer, as seen by HiRISE under HiWish program. Arrows show the thicker unit breaking up into small cells.

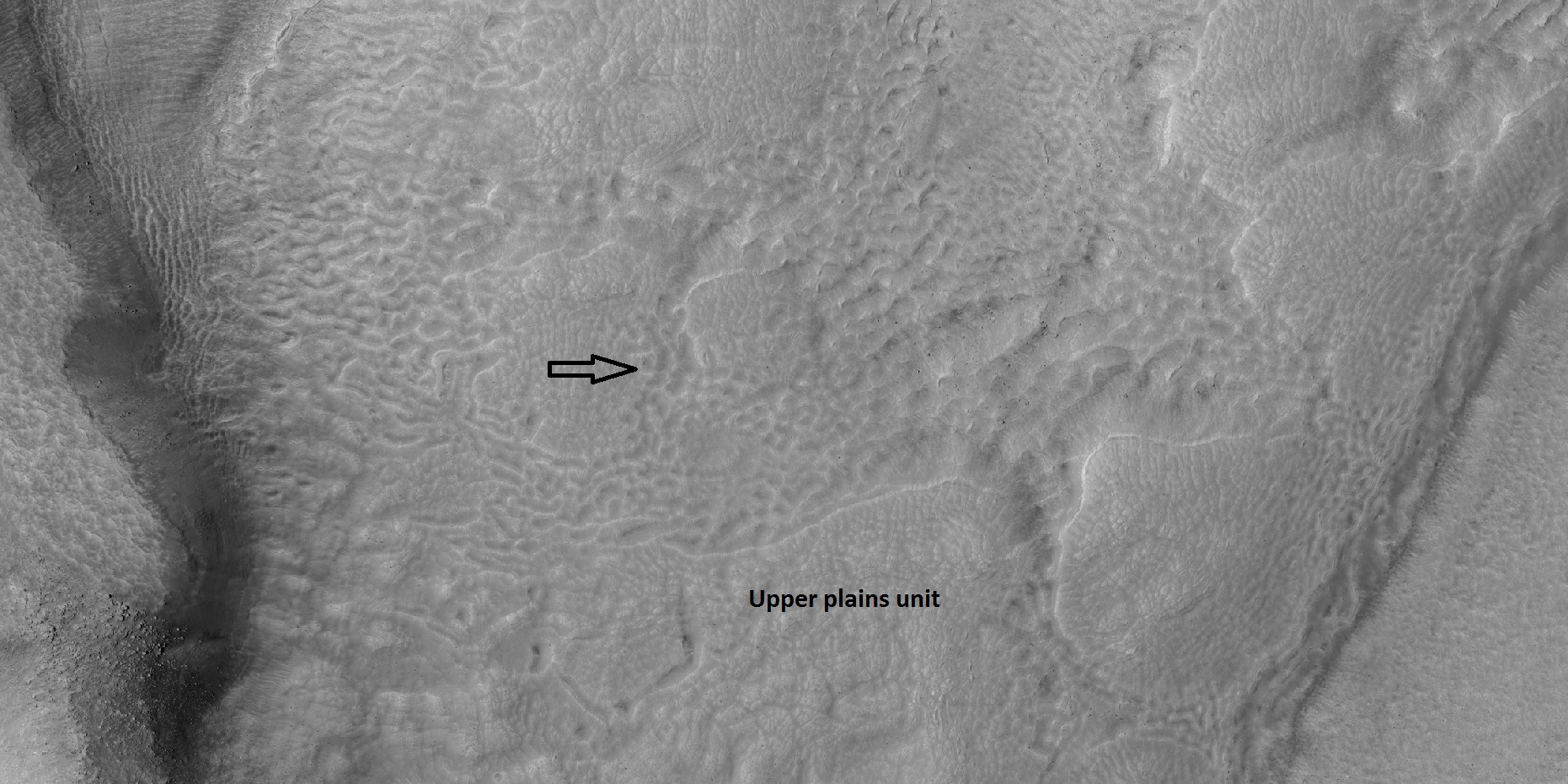
Brain terrain is forming from the breakdown of upper plains unit, as seen by HiRISE under HiWish program Arrow points to a place where fractures are forming that will turn into brain terrain.

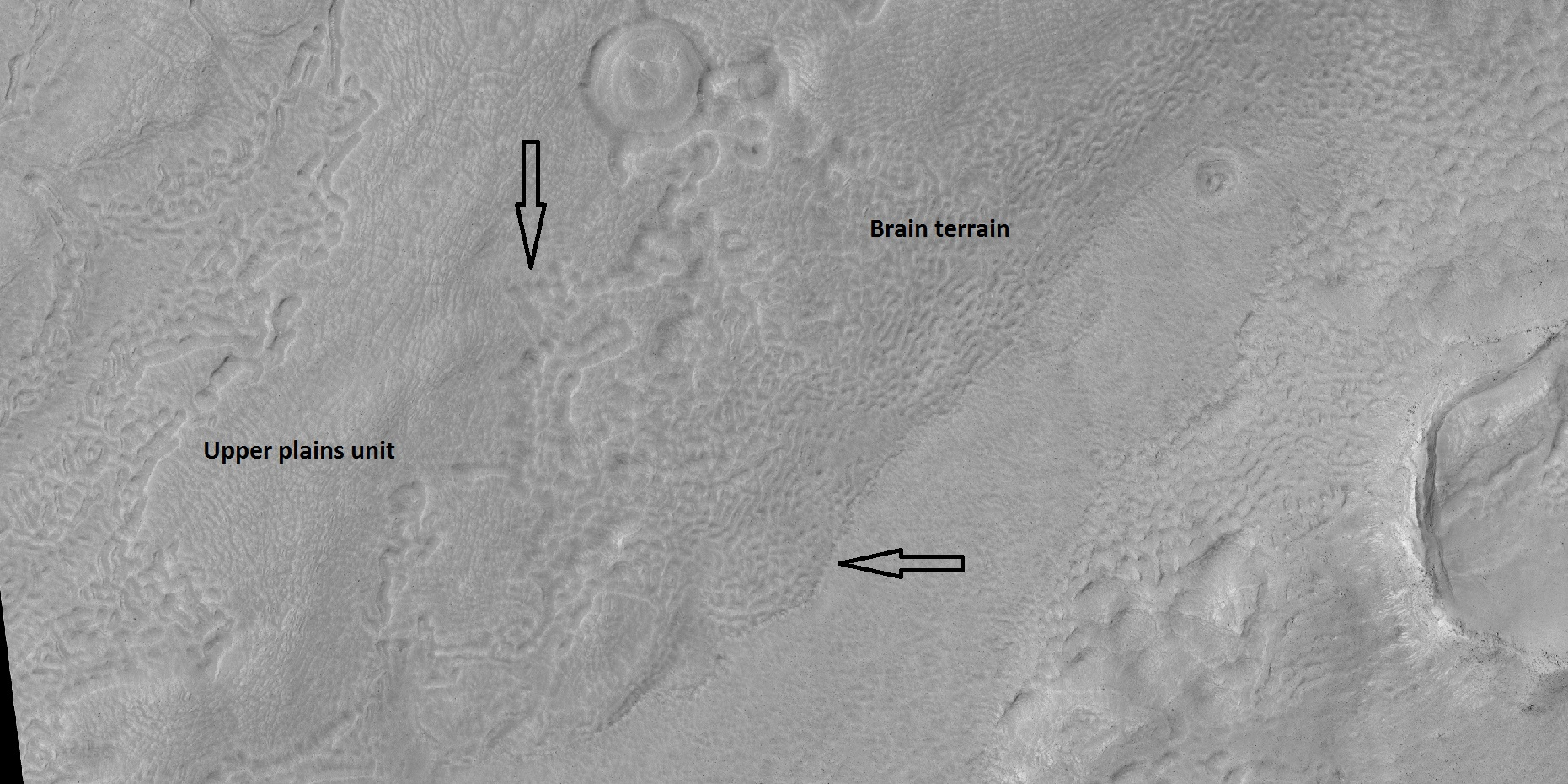
Brain terrain is forming from the breakdown of upper plains unit, as seen by HiRISE under HiWish program Arrow points to a place where fractures are forming that will turn into brain terrain.

Some regions of the upper plains unit display large fractures and troughs with raised rims; such regions are called ribbed upper plains. Fractures are believed to have started with small cracks from stresses. Stress is suggested to initiate the fracture process since ribbed upper plains are common when debris aprons come together or near the edge of debris aprons—such sites would generate compressional stresses. Cracks exposed more surfaces, and consequently more ice in the material sublimates into the planet’s thin atmosphere. Eventually, small cracks become large canyons or troughs.

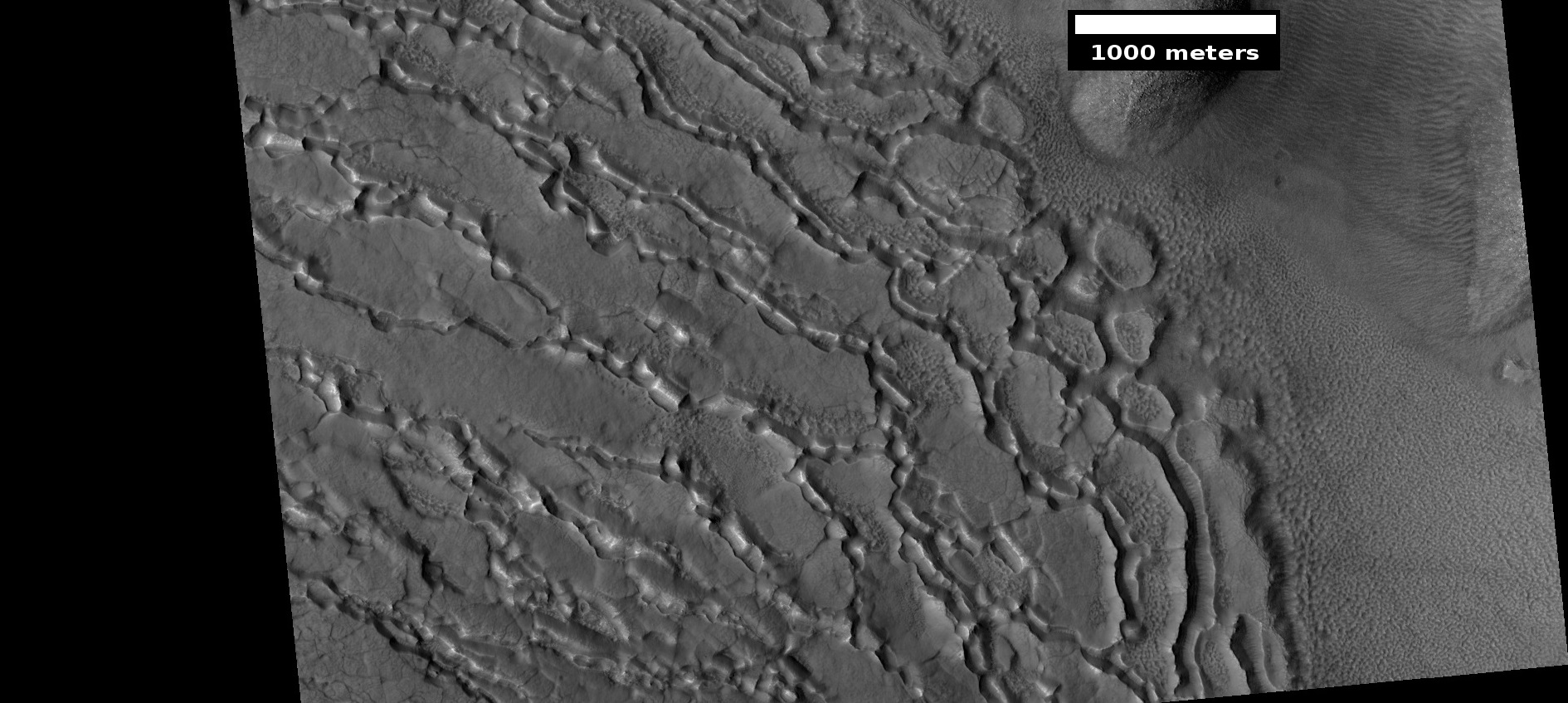
Well developed ribbed upper plains material. These start with small cracks that expand as ice sublimates from the surfaces of the crack. Picture was taken with HiRISE under HiWish program

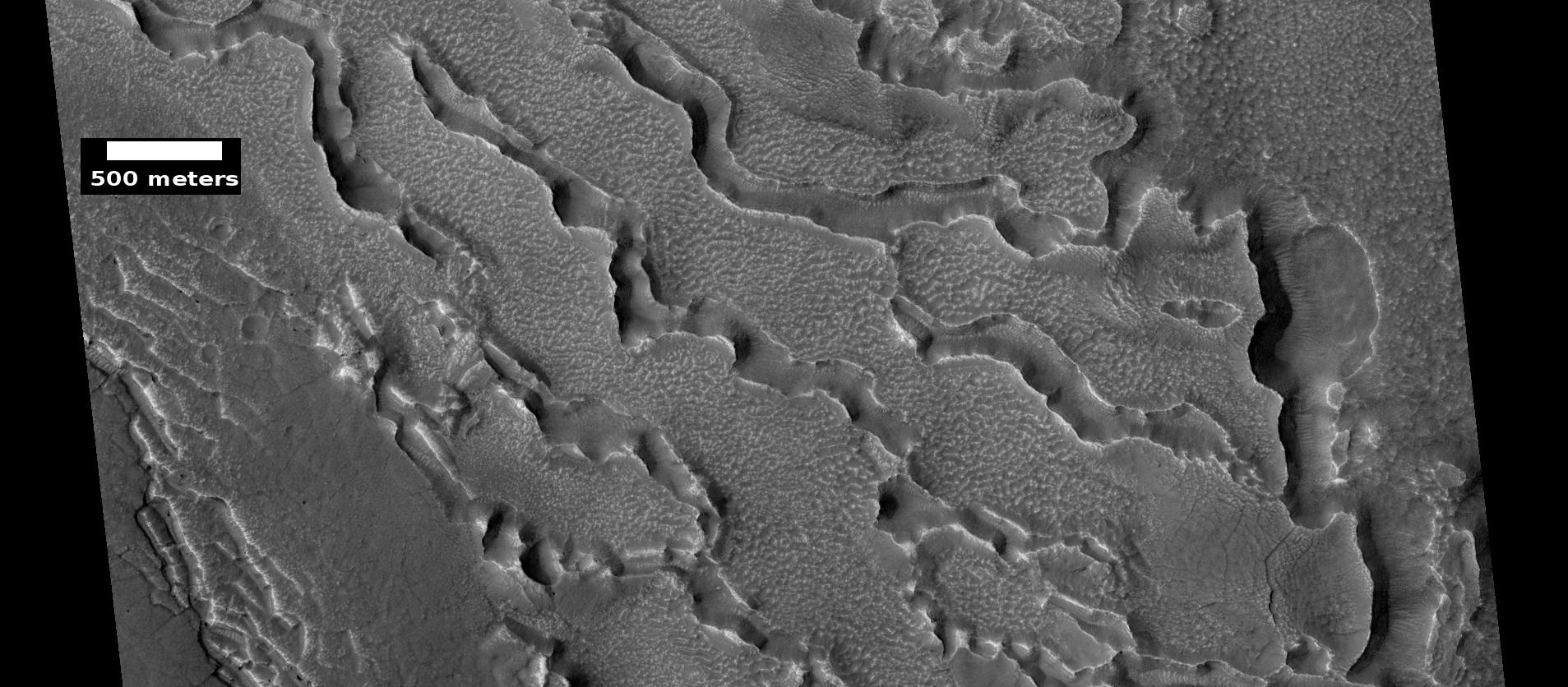
Small and large cracks, as seen by HiRISE under HiWish program The small cracks to the left will enlarge to become much larger dues to sublimation of ground ice. A crack exposes more surface area, hence greatly increases sublimation in the thin Martian air.

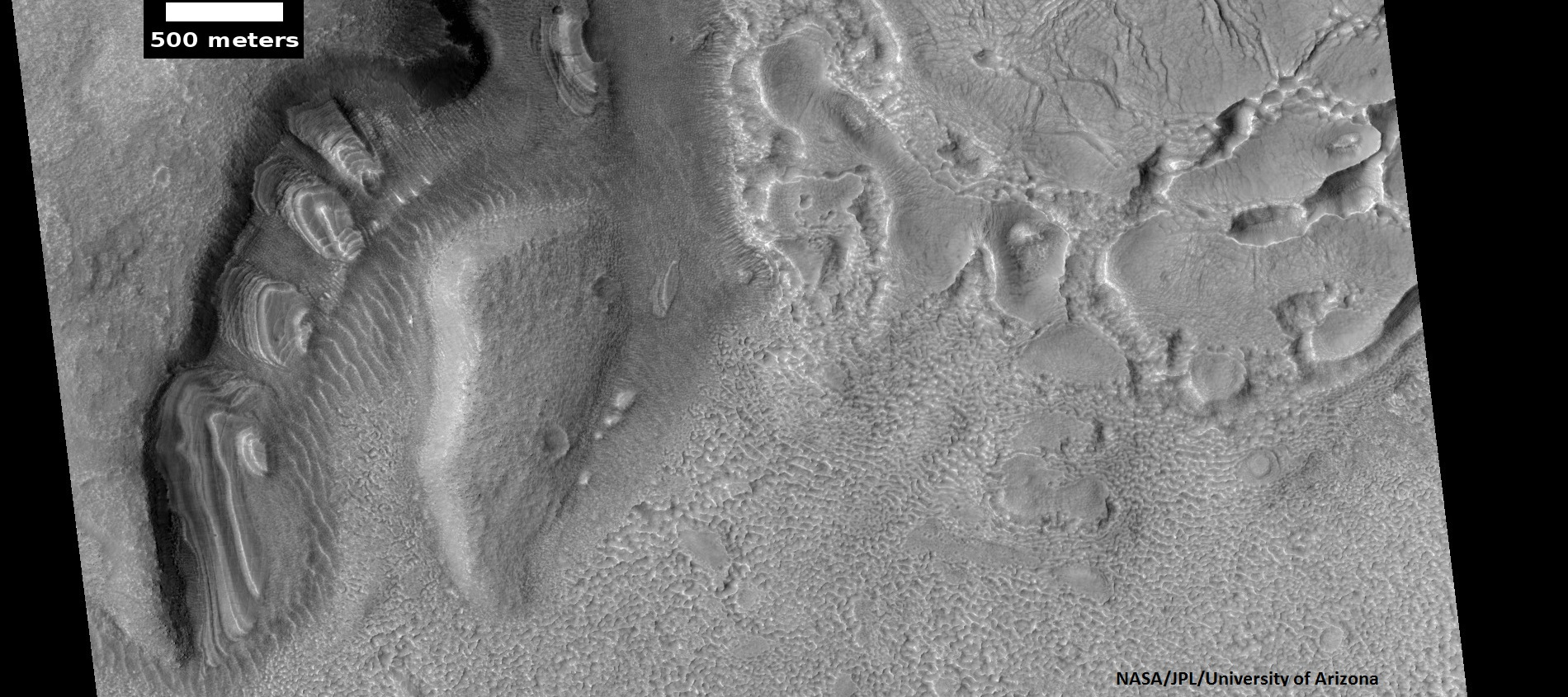
Dipping layers, as seen by HiRISE under HiWish program Also, Ribbed Upper plains material is visible in the upper right of the picture. It is forming from the upper plains unit, and in turn is being eroded into brain terrain.

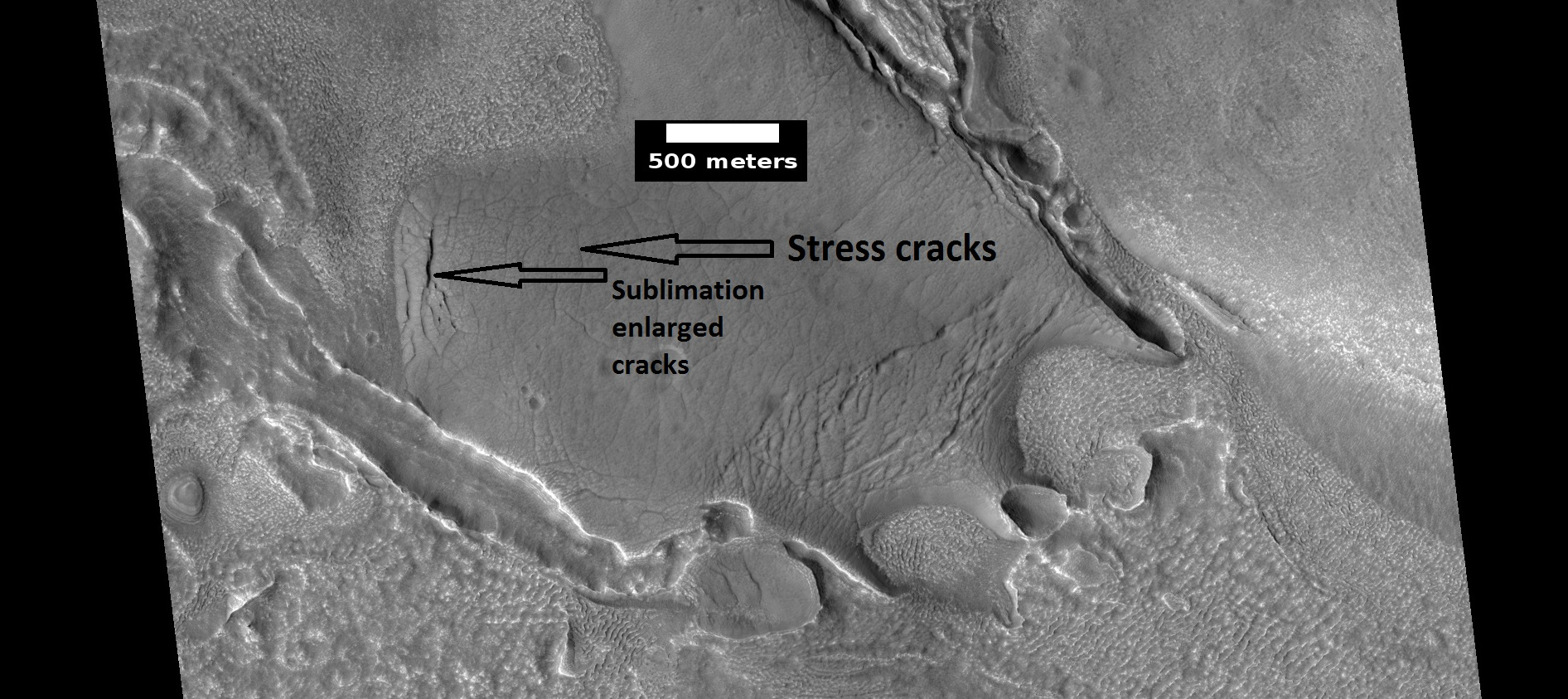
View of stress cracks and larger cracks that have been enlarged by sublimation (ice changing directly into gas) This may be the start of ribbed terrain.

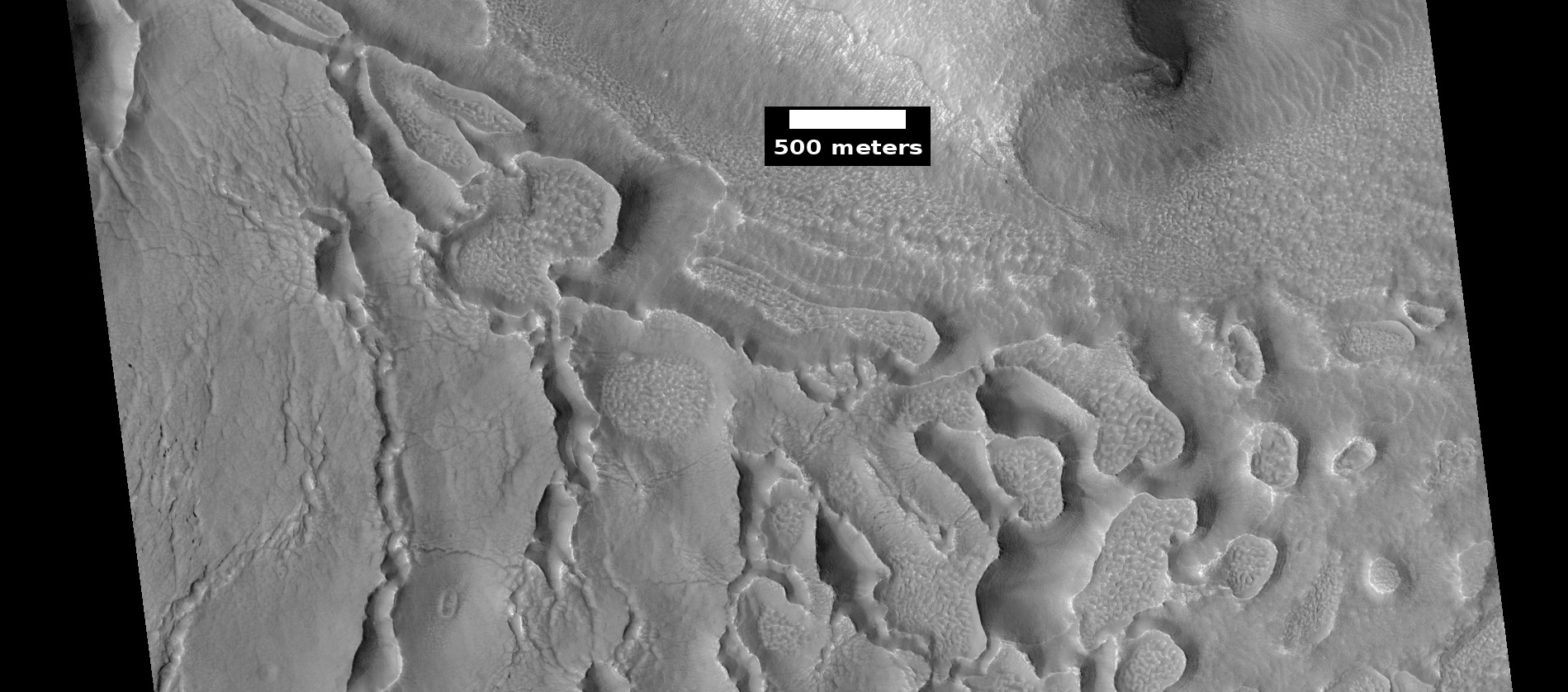
Evolution of ribbed terrain from stress cracks—cracks to the left eventually will enlarge and become ribbed terrain toward the right side of picture, as seen by HiRISE under HiWish program
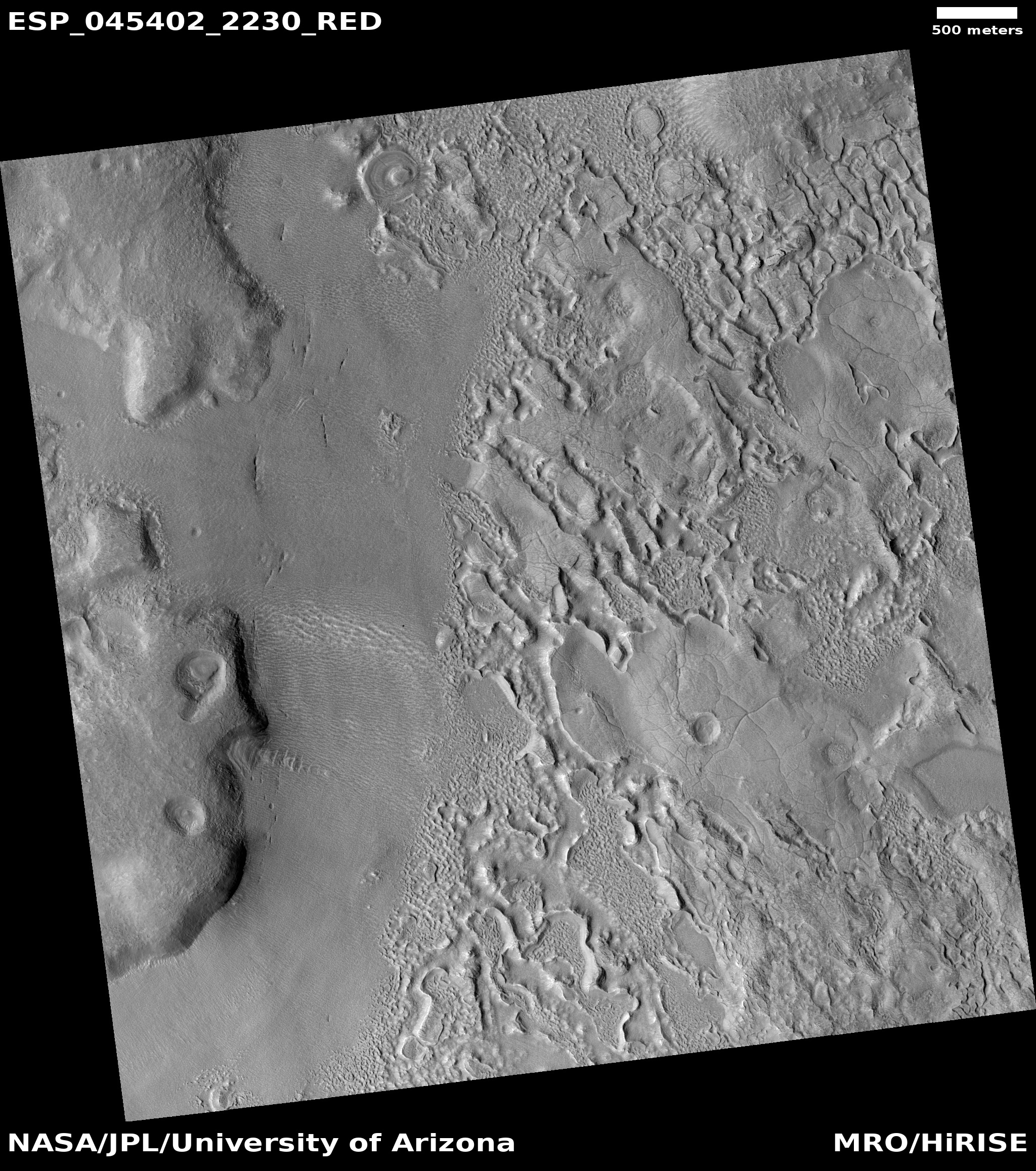
Wide view showing ribbed terrain and brain terrain, as seen by HiRISE under HiWish program

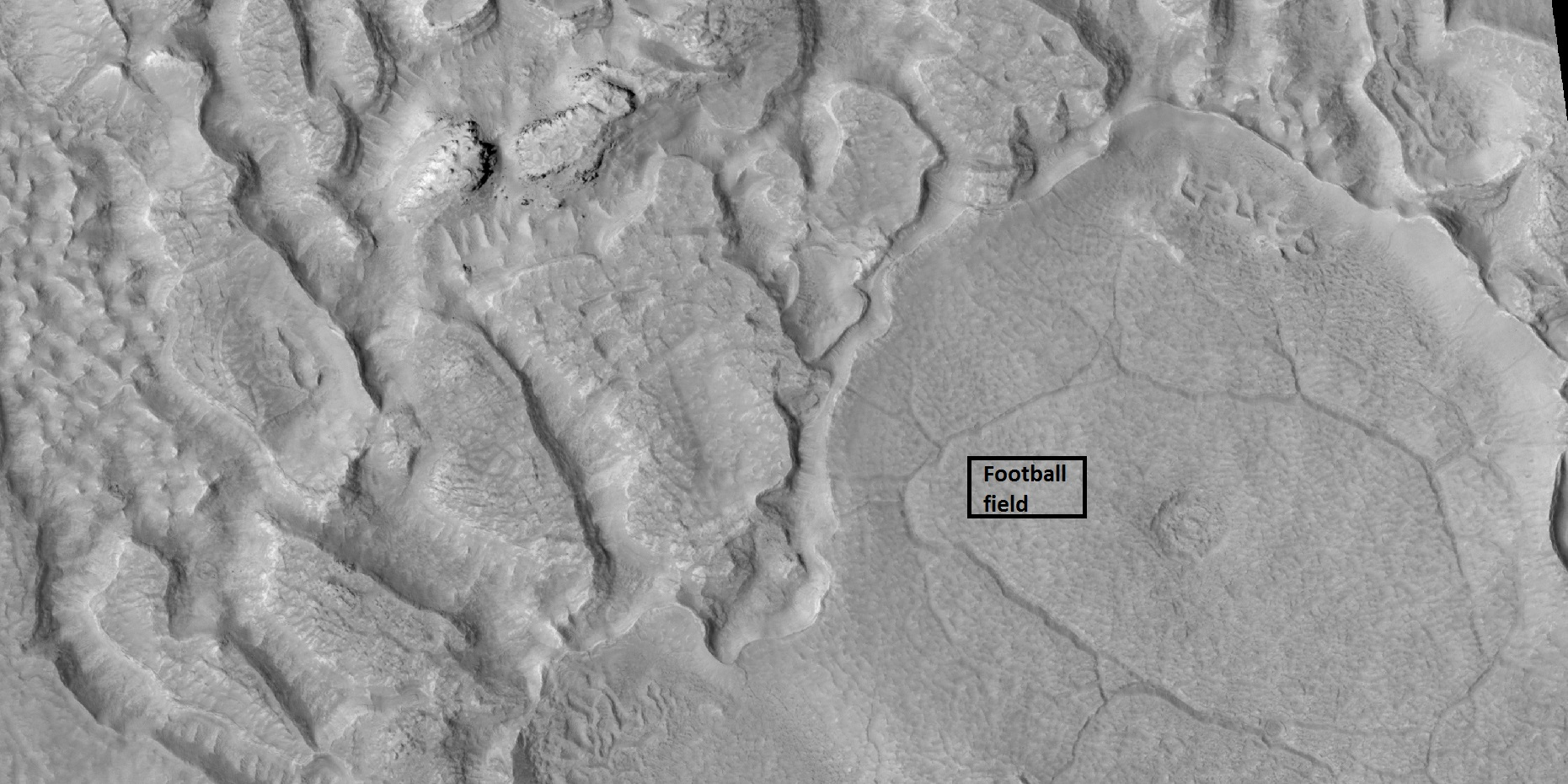
Ribbed terrain being formed from upper plains unit, as seen by HiRISE under HiWish program Formation begins with cracks that enhance sublimation. Box shows the size of football field.
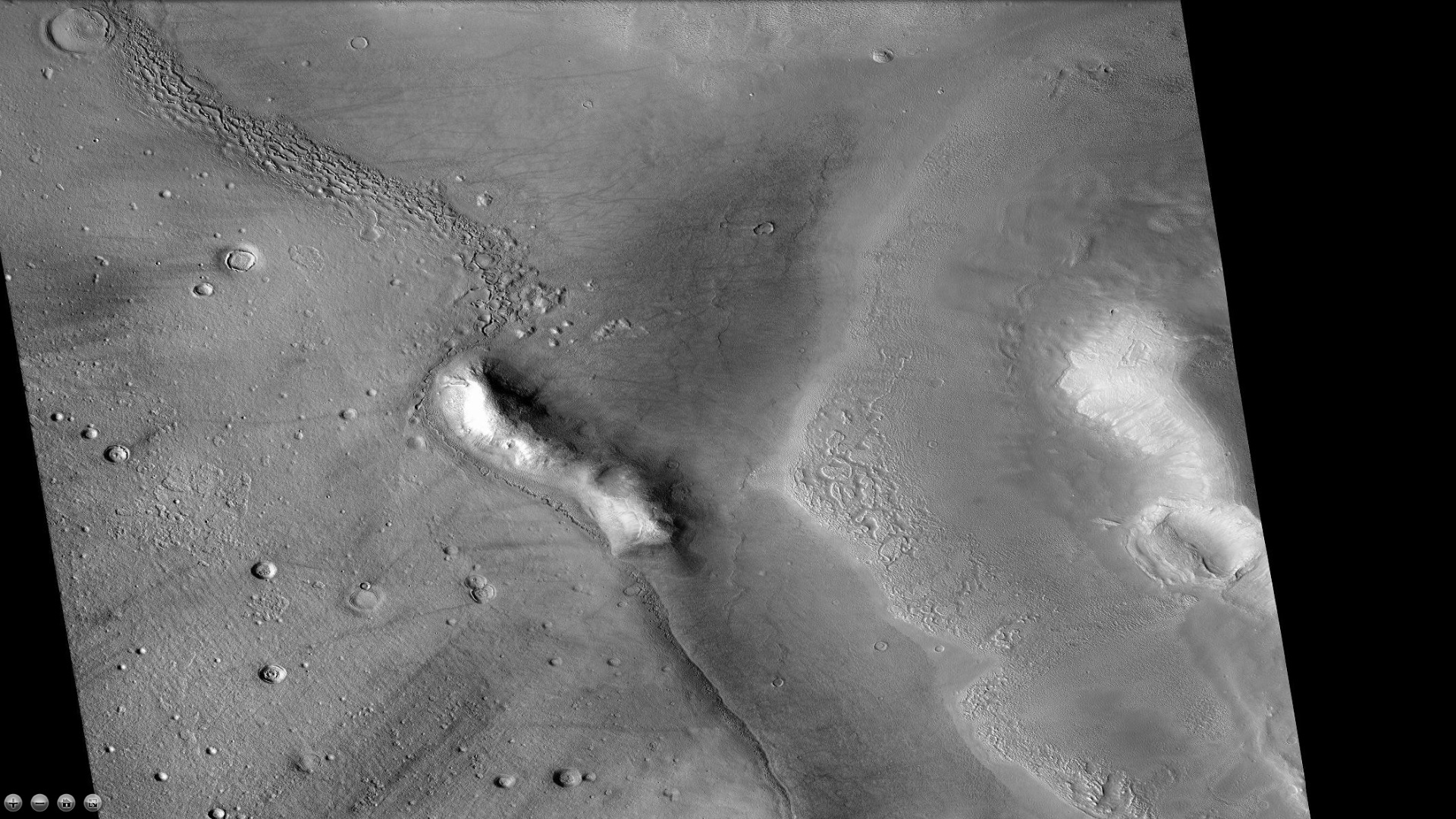
Wide view showing contact between upper plains unit lower part of picture and a lower unit, as seen by CTX

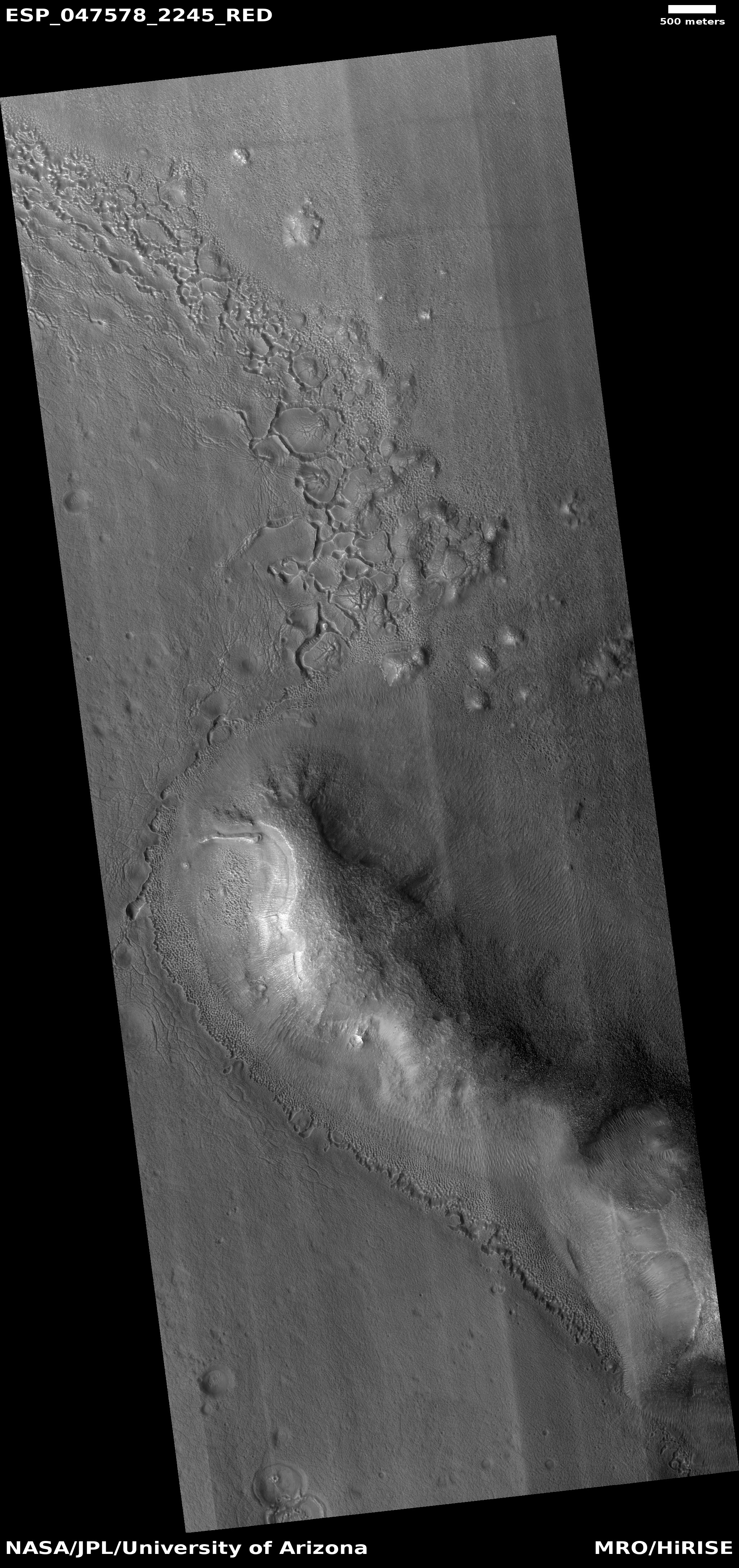
Contact, as seen by HiRISE under HiWish program Upper plains unit on the left is breaking up. A lower unit exists on the right side of picture.

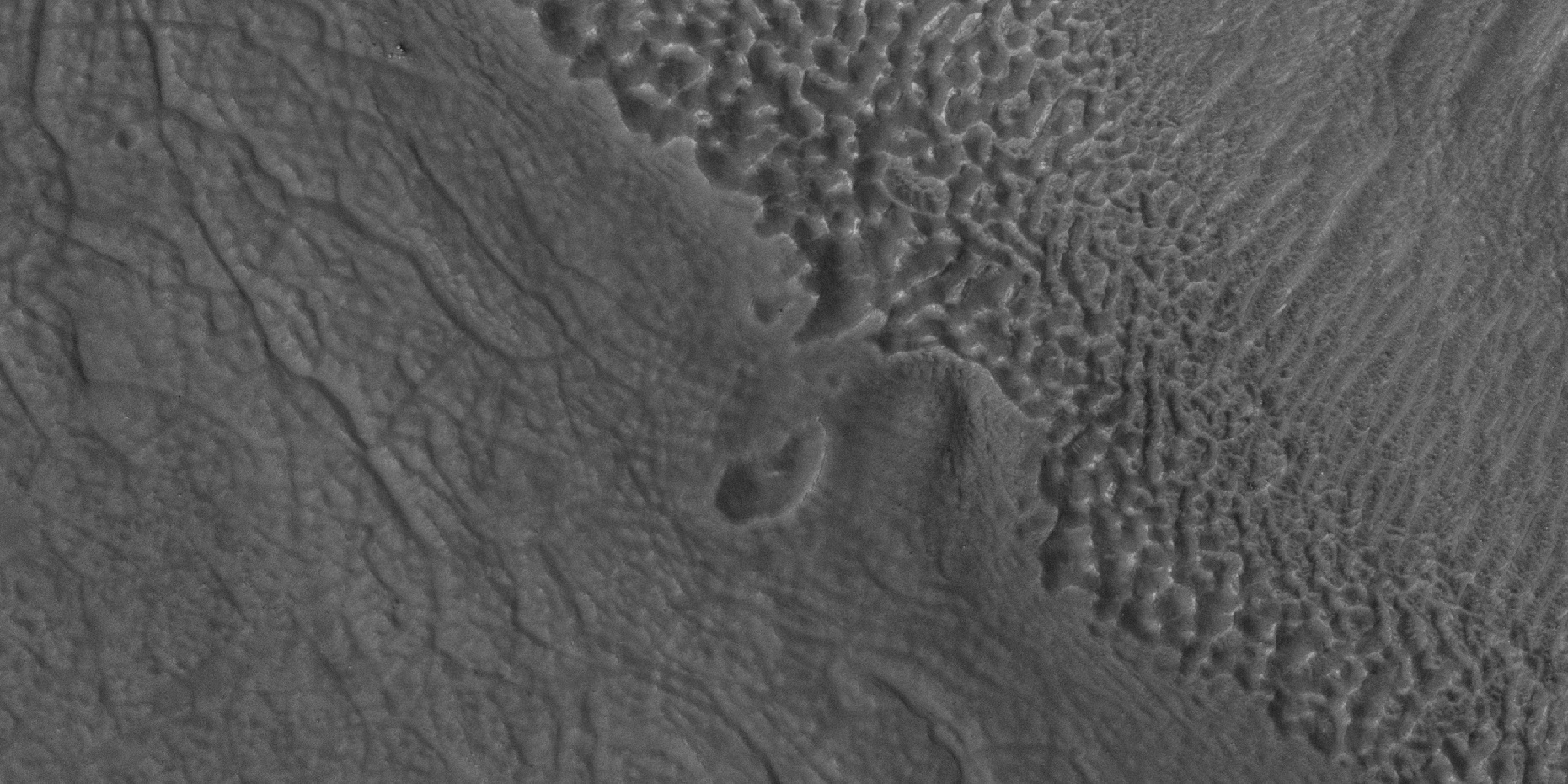
Close view of contact, as seen by HiRISE under HiWish program Picture shows details of how upper plains material is breaking. The formation of many fractures seems to proceed the break up.
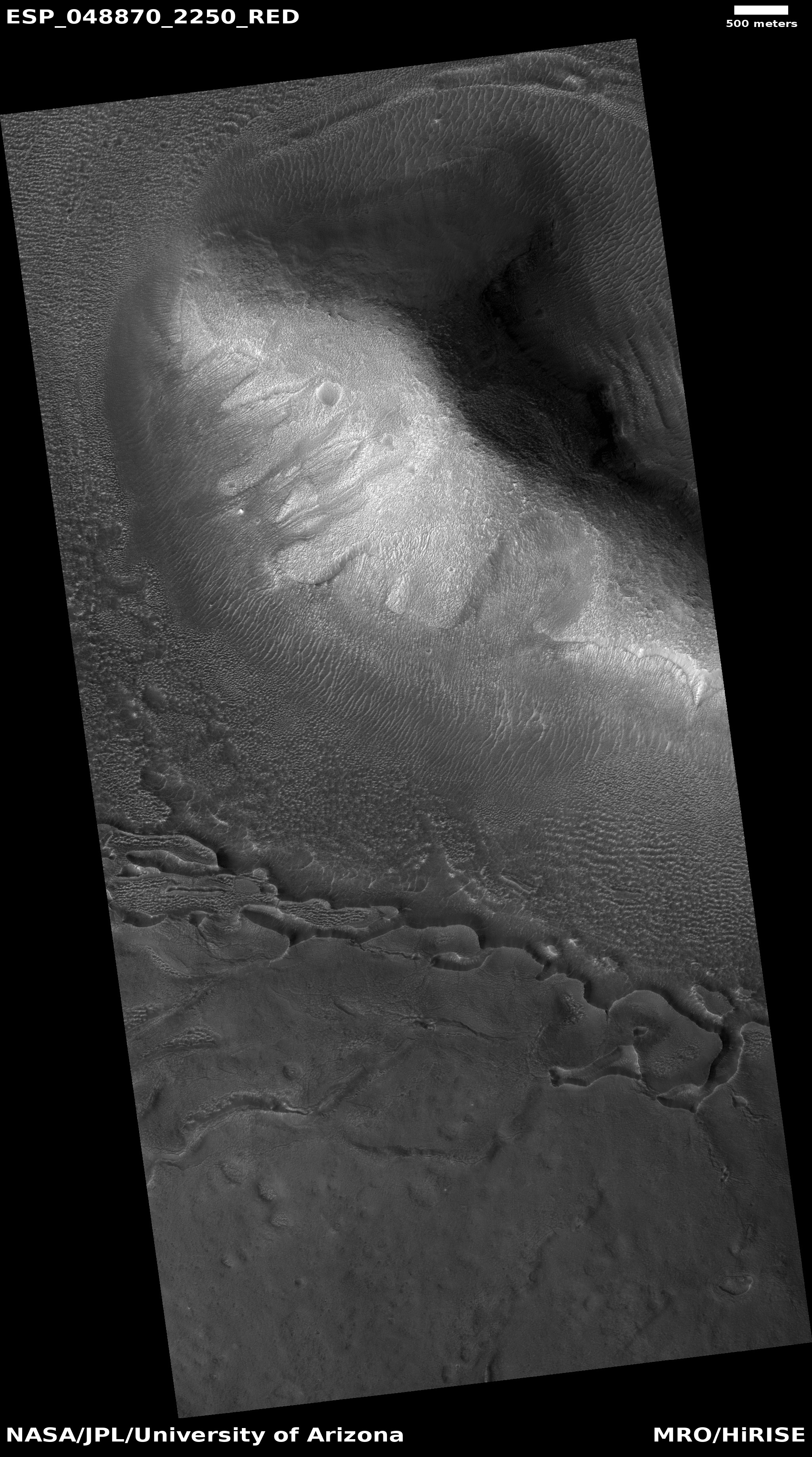
Wide view of upper plains unit eroding into hollows, as seen by HiRISE under HiWish program Parts of this image are enlarged in following images.

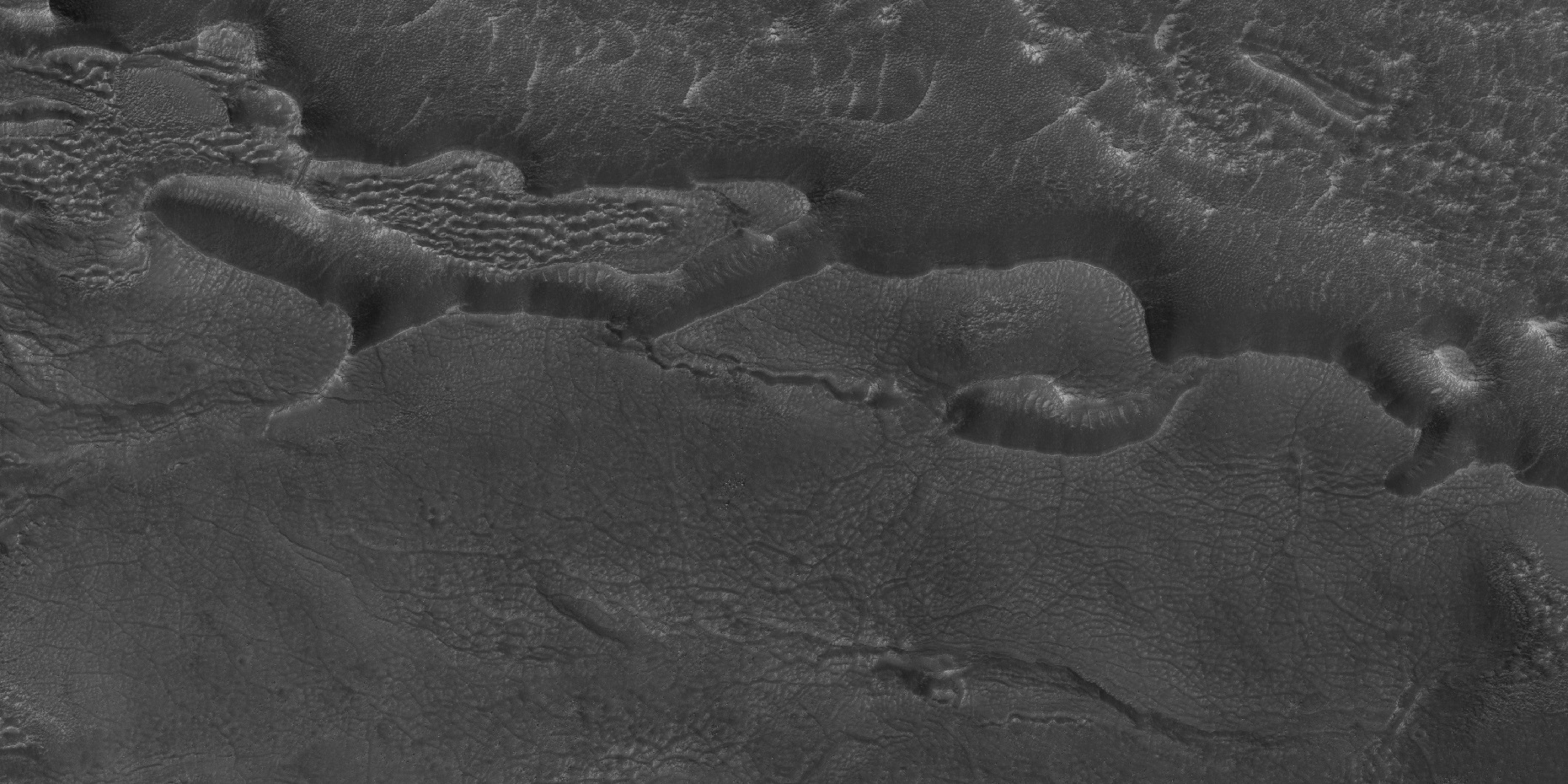
Close view of upper plain unit eroding into hollows, as seen by HiRISE under HiWish program Break up begins with cracks on the surface that expand as more and more ice disappears from the ground.

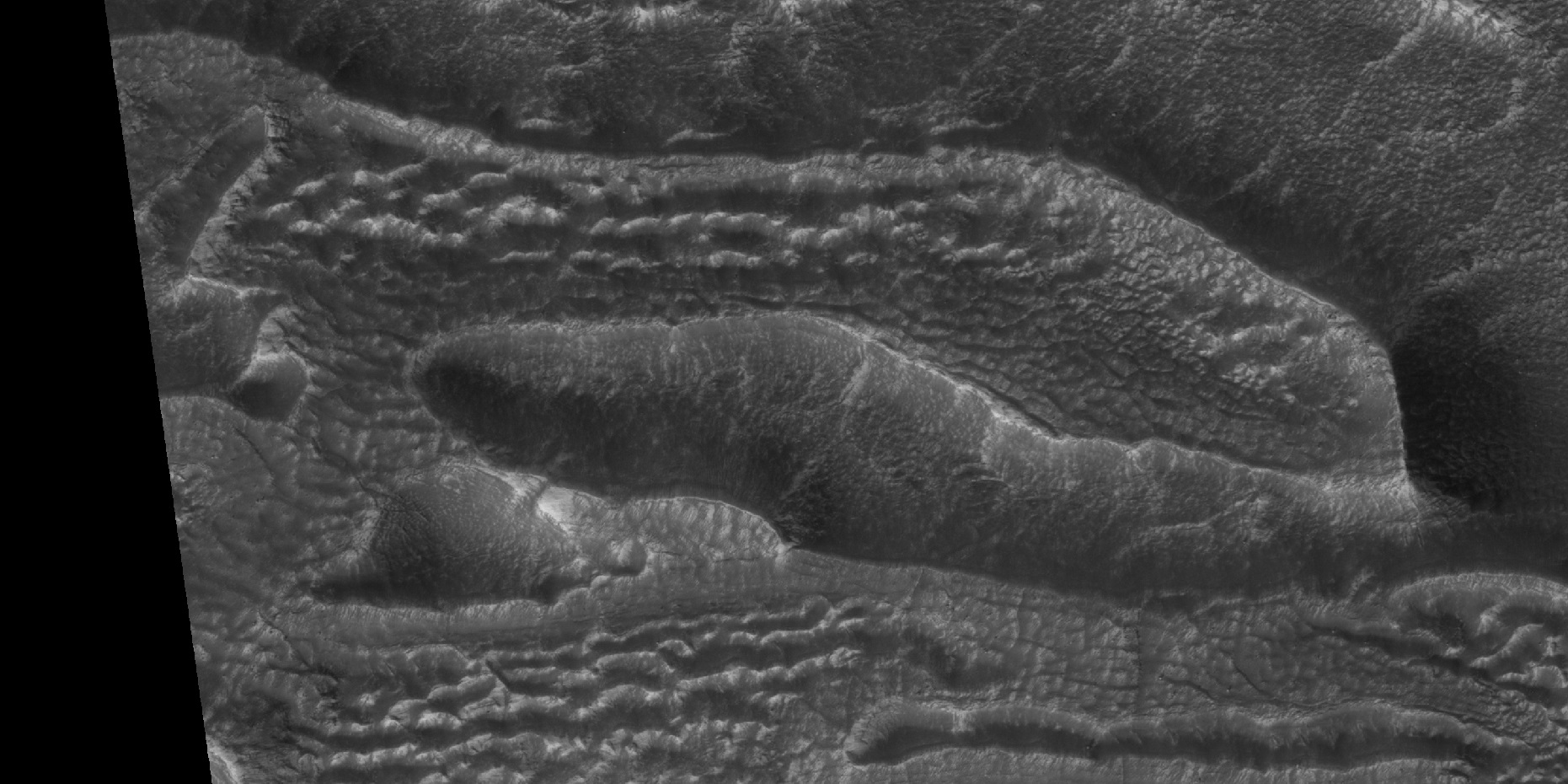
Close view of hollows, as seen by HiRISE under HiWish program

Small cracks often contain small pits and chains of pits; these are thought to be from sublimation of ice in the ground. Large areas of the Martian surface are loaded with ice that is protected by a meters thick layer of dust and other material. However, if cracks appear, a fresh surface will expose ice to the thin atmosphere. In a short time, the ice will disappear into the cold, thin atmosphere in a process called sublimation. Dry ice behaves in a similar fashion on the Earth. On Mars sublimation has been observed when the Phoenix lander uncovered chunks of ice that disappeared in a few days. In addition, HiRISE has seen fresh craters with ice at the bottom. After a time, HiRISE saw the ice deposit disappear.

Die-sized clumps of bright material in the enlarged "Dodo-Goldilocks" trench vanished over the course of four days, implying that they were composed of ice which sublimated following exposure.

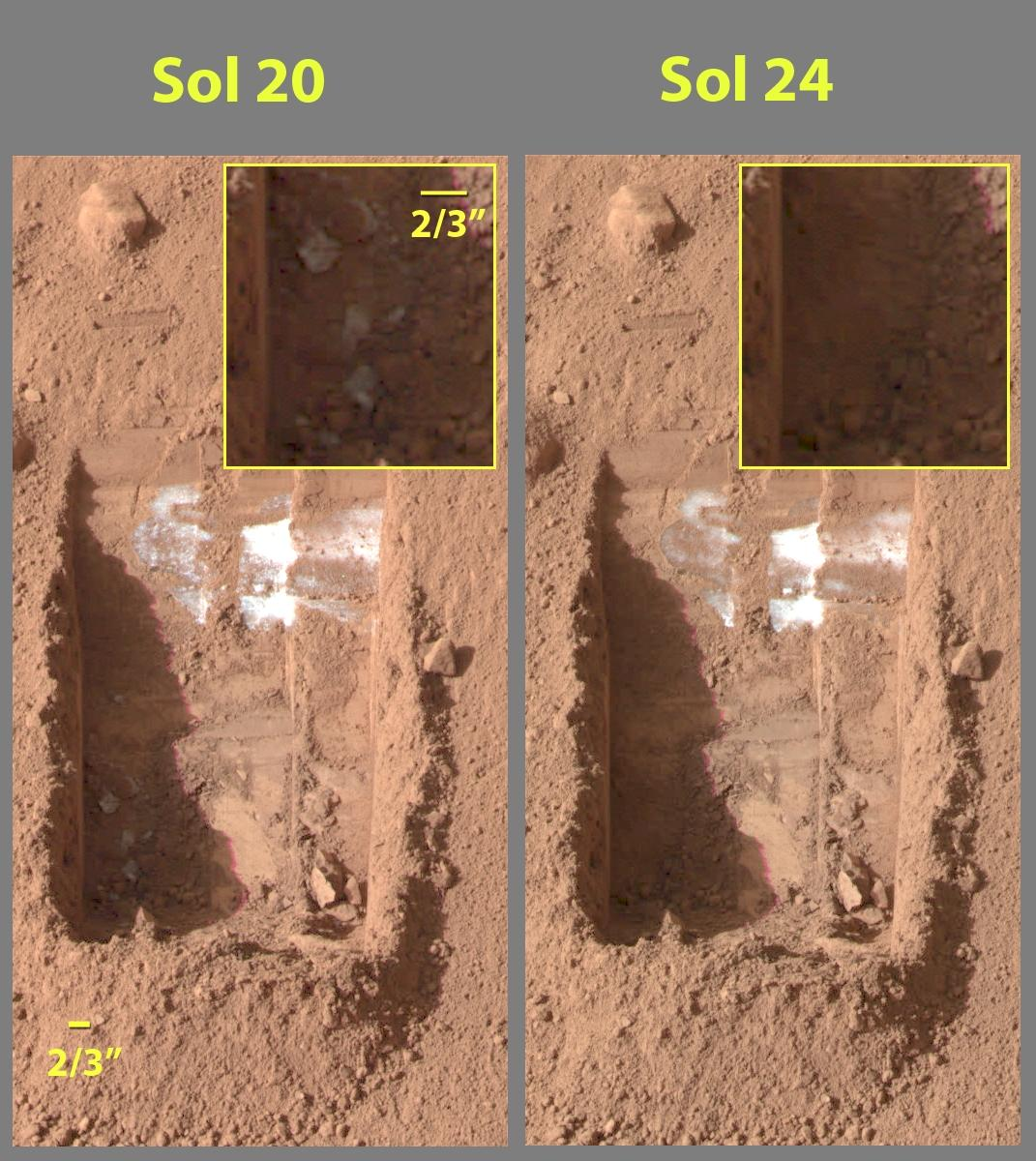
Color versions of the photos showing ice sublimation, with the lower left corner of the trench enlarged in the insets in the upper right of the images.

The upper plains unit is thought to have fallen from the sky. It drapes various surfaces, as if it fell evenly. As is the case for other mantle deposits, the upper plains unit has layers, is fine-grained, and is ice-rich. It is widespread; it does not seem to have a point source. The surface appearance of some regions of Mars is due to how this unit has degraded. It is a major cause of the surface appearance of lobate debris aprons. The layering of the upper plains mantling unit and other mantling units are believed to be caused by major changes in the planet’s climate. Models predict that the obliquity or tilt of the rotational axis has varied from its present 25 degrees to maybe over 80 degrees over geological time. Periods of high tilt will cause the ice in the polar caps to be redistributed and change the amount of dust in the atmosphere.

== See also ==
- Brain terrain
- Climate of Mars
- Geology of Mars
- Ismenius Lacus quadrangle
- Hellas quadrangle
- Lobate debris apron
- Pedestal crater
- Phoenix (spacecraft)
