= Nilosyrtis Mensae =

Fretted terrain in the Casius quadrangle on Mars

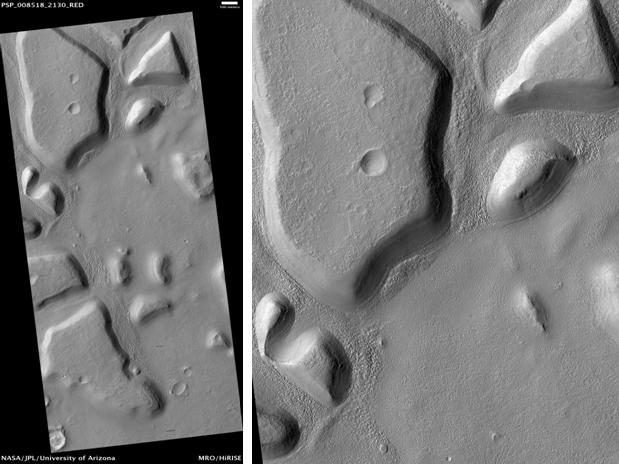
- Astapus Colles Mounds and Knobs, as seen by HiRISE. Scale bar is 500 meters long.
- Coordinates: 36.87°N 67.9°E
- Dimensions: 705 km across
- Naming: a classical albedo feature

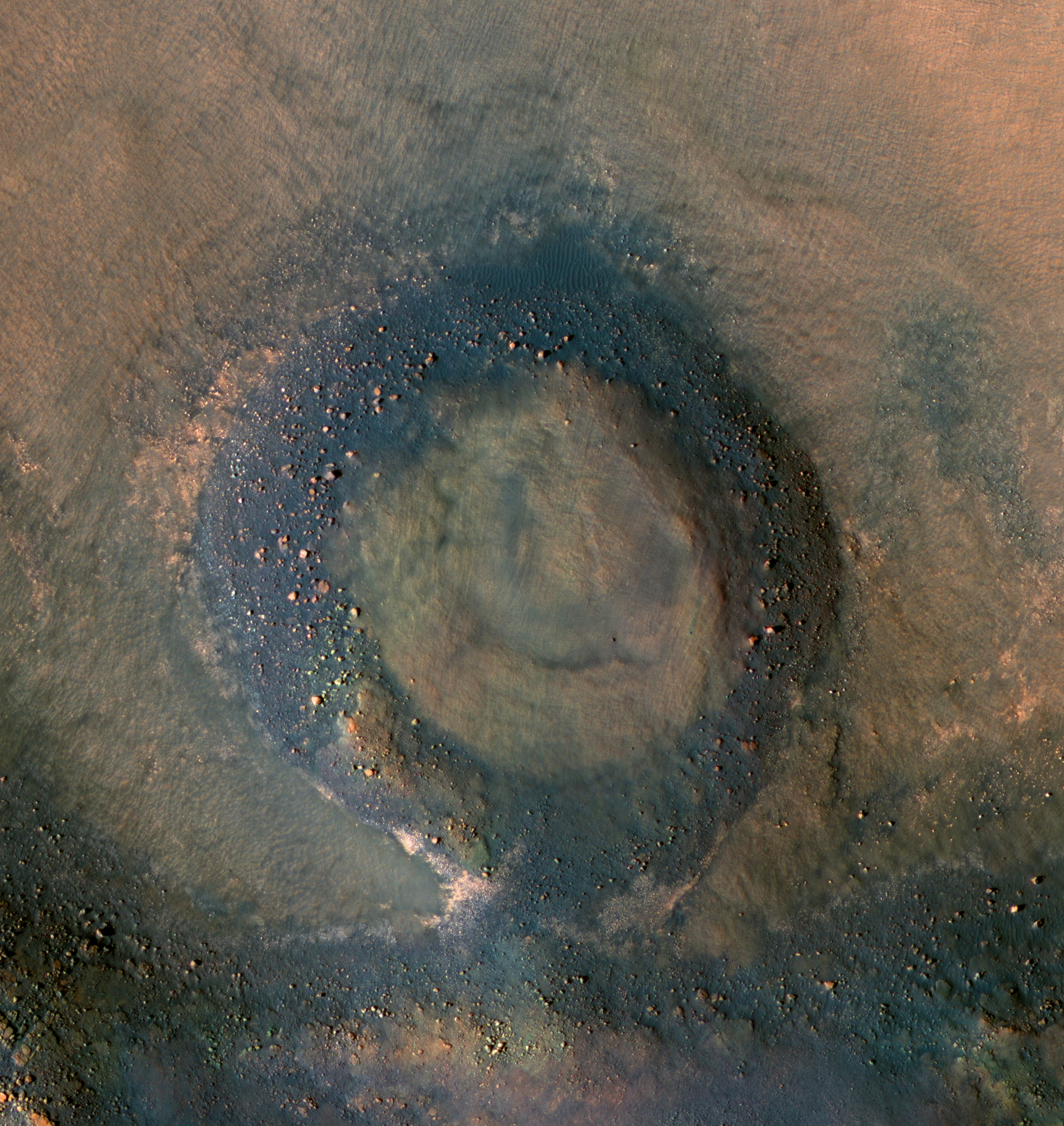
Inverted crater mesa, Nilosyrtis Mensae. This is thought to be an old impact crater that was eroded, filled in and then eroded again, so that now it is a low mesa surrounded by a bouldery slope. Image is about 900 m wide.

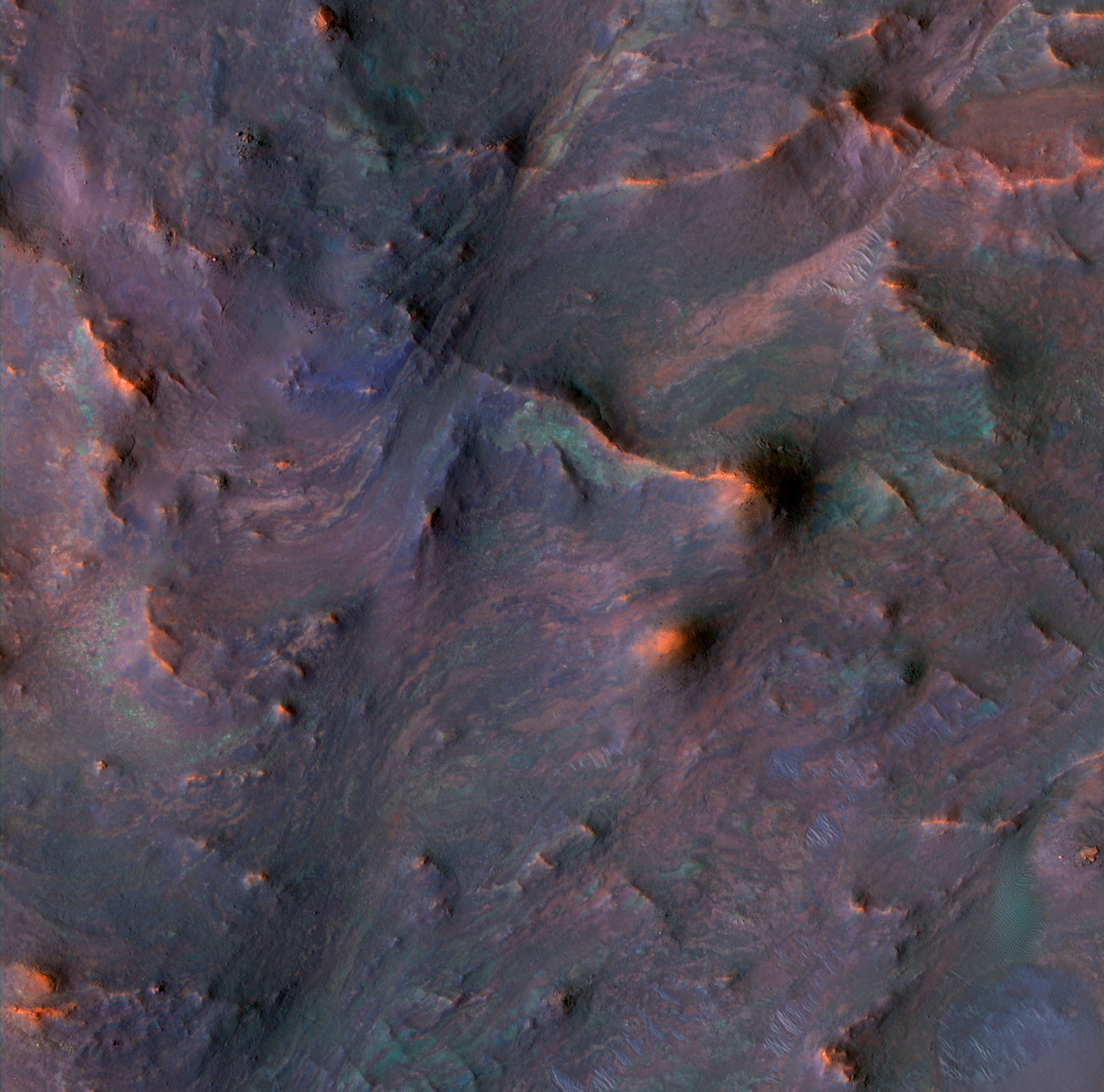
Bedrock in Nilosyrtis Mensae. Image is about 1.5 km wide. In this enhanced-color image, the blue and green colors are generally due to mafic (magnesium and iron rich) minerals that are not altered by water, while the warmer colors are due to altered minerals like clays. The structure in this scene is complex, from impact and perhaps fluvial and volcanic processes, tectonic faulting, and erosion. This is an old terrain with a complex geologic history.

Nilosyrtis Mensae is an area of Mars in the Casius quadrangle. It is centered on the coordinates of 36.87° N and 67.9° E. Its western and eastern longitudes are 51.1° E and 74.4° E. North and south latitudes are 36.87° N and 29.61° N. Nilosyrtis Mensae is just to the east of Protonilus Mensae and both lie along the Martian dichotomy boundary. Its name was adapted by the IAU in 1973. It was named after a classical albedo feature, and it is 705 km (438 mi) across.

The surface of Nilosyrtis Mensae is classified as fretted terrain. This terrain contains cliffs, mesas, and wide flat valleys. Surface features are believed to have been caused by debris-covered glaciers. These glaciers are termed lobate debris aprons when surrounding mounds and mesas. When the glaciers are in the valleys they are called lineated valley fill.

== Climate change caused ice-rich features ==
For decades many features on Mars, including ones in Nilosyrtis Mensae, were believed to contain large amounts of ice. This idea was confirmed by radar studies with the SHAllow RADar (SHARAD) on the Mars Reconnaissance Orbiter. It showed that lobate debris aprons (LDA) and lineated valley fill (LVF) contain pure water ice covered with a thin layer of rocks that insulated the ice. Ice was found in many locations in the northern hemisphere, including Nilosyrtis Mensae. The most popular model for the origin of the ice is climate change from large changes in the tilt of the planet's rotational axis. At times the tilt has even been greater than 80 degrees Large changes in the tilt explains many ice-rich features on Mars.

Studies have shown that when the tilt of Mars reaches 45 degrees from its current 25 degrees, ice is no longer stable at the poles. Furthermore, at this high tilt, stores of solid carbon dioxide (dry ice) sublimate, thereby increasing the atmospheric pressure. This increased pressure allows more dust to be held in the atmosphere. Moisture in the atmosphere will fall as snow or as ice frozen onto dust grains. Calculations suggest this material will concentrate in the mid-latitudes. General circulation models of the Martian atmosphere predict accumulations of ice-rich dust in the same areas where ice-rich features are found. When the tilt begins to return to lower values, the ice sublimates (turns directly to a gas) and leaves behind a lag of dust. The lag deposit caps the underlying material so with each cycle of high tilt levels, some ice-rich mantle remains behind. Note, that the smooth surface mantle layer probably represents only relatively recent material.

== See also ==
- Deuteronilus Mensae
- Geology of Mars
- Glacier
- Ismenius Lacus quadrangle
- Martian dichotomy
- Protonilus Mensae
