= Martian dichotomy =

Geomorphological feature of Mars

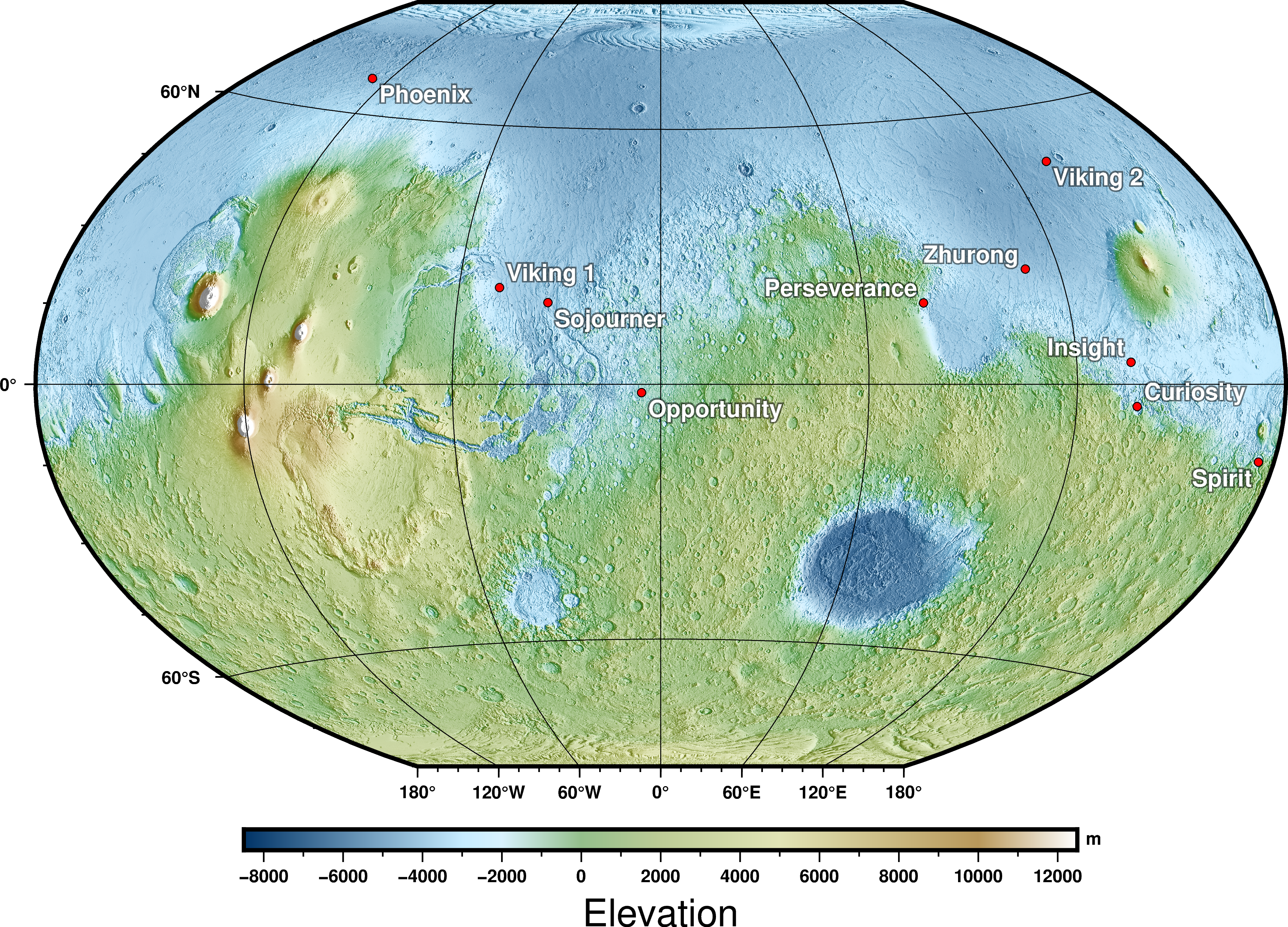
Relief map of Mars

The Martian dichotomy is a geomorphical feature of Mars, characterized by the contrast between the Southern and the Northern hemispheres. The two hemispheres' geography differ in elevation by 1 to 3 km. The average thickness of the Martian crust is 45 km, with 32 km in the northern lowlands region, and 58 km in the southern highlands.

The boundary between the two regions is quite complex in places. One distinctive type of topography is called fretted terrain. It contains mesas, knobs, and flat-floored valleys having walls about a mile high. Around many of the mesas and knobs are lobate debris aprons that have been shown to be rock glaciers.

Many large valleys formed by the lava erupted from the volcanoes of Mars cut through the dichotomy.

The Martian dichotomy boundary includes the regions called Deuteronilus Mensae, Protonilus Mensae, and Nilosyrtis Mensae. All three regions have been studied extensively because they contain landforms believed to have been produced by the movement of ice or paleoshorelines, though the latter interpretation has been questioned, with volcanic erosion proposed as an alternative. In the Terra Cimmeria–Nepenthes Mensae transitional zone, the dichotomy boundary is characterized by an escarpment with a local relief of about 2 km, and interconnected NW-SE-trending closed depressions at the foot of the dichotomy probably related to extensional tectonics.

The northern lowlands comprise about one-third of the surface of Mars and are relatively flat, without as many impact craters as the southern hemisphere. The other two-thirds of the Martian surface are the highlands of the southern hemisphere. The difference in elevation between the hemispheres is dramatic. Three major hypotheses have been proposed for the origin of the crustal dichotomy: endogenic (by mantle processes), single impact, or multiple impact. Both impact-related hypotheses involve processes that could have occurred before the end of the primordial bombardment, implying that the crustal dichotomy has its origins early in the history of Mars.

== Origin ==
A STL 3D model of Mars with a 20× elevation exaggeration showing the Martian dichotomy

=== Single impact hypothesis ===
A single mega-impact would produce a very large, circular depression in the crust. The proposed depression has been named the Borealis Basin. However, most estimates of the shape of the lowland area produce a shape that in places dramatically deviates from the circular shape. Additional processes could create those deviations from circularity. If the proposed Borealis basin is a depression created by an impact, it would be the largest impact crater known in the Solar System. An object that large could have hit Mars sometime during the process of the Solar System accretion.

It is expected that an impact of such magnitude would have produced an ejecta blanket that should be found in areas around the lowland and generate enough heat to form volcanoes. However, if the impact occurred around 4.5 Ga (billion years ago), erosion could explain the absence of the ejecta blanket but could not explain the absence of volcanoes. Also, the mega-impact could have scattered a large portion of the debris into outer space and across the southern hemisphere. Geologic evidence of the debris would provide very convincing support for this hypothesis.

A 2008 study provided additional research towards the single giant impact theory in the northern hemisphere. In the past, tracing the impact boundaries was complicated by the presence of the Tharsis volcanic rise. The Tharsis volcanic rise buried part of the proposed dichotomy boundary under 30 km of basalt. The researchers at MIT and Jet Propulsion Lab at CIT have been able to use gravity and topography of Mars to constrain the location of the dichotomy beneath the Tharsis rise, thus creating an elliptical model of the dichotomy boundary. The elliptical shape of the Borealis basin contributed to the northern single impact hypothesis as a revision of the original theory published in 1984.

This hypothesis has been countered by a new hypothesis of a giant impact to the south pole of Mars with a large object that melted the southern hemisphere of Mars, which, after recrystallisation, forms a thicker crust relative to the northern hemisphere and thus gives rise to the crustal dichotomy observed. This may have triggered the magnetic field of the planet. The discovery of twelve volcanic alignments lends evidence to this new hypothesis. Initially, the estimated size of the impacting body required for this scenario was Moon-sized, but more recent research favour a smaller, 500-750 km-radius projectile.

=== Endogenic origin hypothesis ===
It is believed that plate tectonic processes could have been active on Mars early in the planet's history. Large-scale redistribution of lithospheric crustal material is known to be caused by plate tectonic processes on Earth. Even though it is still not entirely clear how mantle processes affect plate tectonics on Earth, mantle convection is believed to consist of cells or plumes. Since endogenic processes of Earth have yet to be completely understood, study of similar processes on Mars is very difficult.

The dichotomy could be created at the time of the creation of the Martian core. The roughly circular shape of the lowland could then be attributed to plume-like first-order overturn which could occur in the process of rapid core formation. There is evidence for internally driven tectonic events in the vicinity of the lowland area that clearly occurred at the end of the early bombardment phase.

A 2005 study suggests that degree-1 mantle convection could have created the dichotomy. Degree-1 mantle convection is a convective process in which one hemisphere is dominated by an upwelling, while the other hemisphere is downwelling. Some of the evidence is the abundance of extensive fracturing and igneous activity of late Noachian to early Hesperian age. A counter argument to the endogenic hypothesis is the possibility of those tectonic events occurring in the Borealis Basin due to the post-impact weakening of the crust. In order to further support the endogenic origin hypothesis geologic evidence of faulting and flexing of the crust prior to the end of the primordial bombardment is needed.

However, the lack of plate tectonics on Mars weakens this hypothesis.

=== Multiple impact hypothesis ===
The multiple impact hypothesis is supported by correlation of segments of the dichotomy with the rims of several large impact basins. But there are large parts of the Borealis Basin outside the rims of those impact basins. If the Martian lowlands were formed by the multiple basins then their inner ejecta and rims should stand above upland elevations. The rims and ejecta blankets of the lowland impact craters are still much below the upland areas.

There are areas in the lowlands that are outside any of the impact basins. These areas must be overlain by multiple ejecta blankets, and should stand at elevations similar to the original planetary surface. That clearly is not the case either. One approach explaining the absence of ejecta blankets infers that no ejecta was ever present.

Absence of ejecta could be caused by a large impactor scattering the ejecta into outer space. Another approach proposed the formation of the dichotomy by cooling at depth and crustal loading by later volcanism. The multiple-impact hypothesis is also statistically unfavorable because it is unlikely that multiple impact basins occur and overlap primarily in the northern hemisphere.

== Atmosphere ==
The atmosphere of Mars varies significantly between its Northern and Southern hemispheres, both for reasons related and unrelated to the geographic dichotomy.

=== Dust storms ===
More visibly, dust storms originate in the Southern hemisphere far more often than in the North. High Northern dust content tends to occur after exceptional Southern storms escalate into global dust storms. As a consequence, opacity (tau) is often higher in the Southern hemisphere. The effect of higher dust content is to increase absorption of sunlight, increasing atmospheric temperature.

=== Precession of the equinoxes ===
The spin axis of Mars, as with many bodies, precesses over millions of years. At present, the solstices nearly coincide with Mars's aphelion and perihelion. This results in one hemisphere, the Southern, receiving more sunlight in summer and less in winter, and thus more extreme temperatures, than the Northern. When combined with Mars's much higher eccentricity compared to Earth, and far thinner atmosphere in general, Southern winters and summers are wider ranging than on Earth.

=== Hadley circulation and volatiles ===
The Hadley circulation of Mars is offset from symmetry about its equator. When combined with the greater seasonal range of the Southern hemisphere (see above), this results in "the striking north-south hemispherical asymmetries of the atmospheric and residual ice cap inventories of Mars water", "as well as the current north-south asymmetry of the seasonal ice cap albedos". The atmosphere of Mars is currently "a nonlinear pump of water into the northern hemisphere of Mars."

== See also ==
- Areography (geography of Mars) – Delineation and characterization of Martian regions
- Deuteronilus Mensae – Mensae on Mars
- Fretted terrain – Surface feature common to certain areas of Mars
- Geology of Mars – Geology of fourth planet from the Sun
- Glacier – Persistent body of ice that moves downhill under its own weight
- Glaciers on Mars – Extraterrestrial bodies of ice
- Lobate debris apron – Geological features on Mars
- Nilosyrtis Mensae – Fretted terrain in the Casius quadrangle on Mars
- Protonilus Mensae – Martian plain
- Water on Mars – Study of past and present water on Mars
