= Protonilus Mensae =

Martian plain

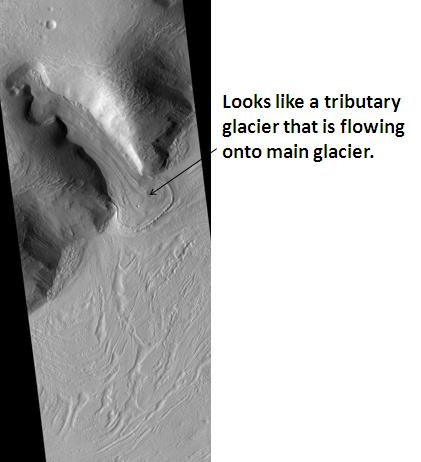
- Tributary Glacier, in Protonilus Mensae as seen by HiRISE.
- Coordinates: 43.86°N 49.4°E

Protonilus Mensae is an area of Mars in the Ismenius Lacus quadrangle. It is centered on the coordinates of 43.86° N and 49.4° E. Its western and eastern longitudes are 37° E and 59.7° E. North and south latitudes are 47.06° N and 39.87° N. Protonilus Mensae is between Deuteronilus Mensae and Nilosyrtis Mensae; all lie along the Martian dichotomy boundary. Its name was adapted by the IAU in 1973.

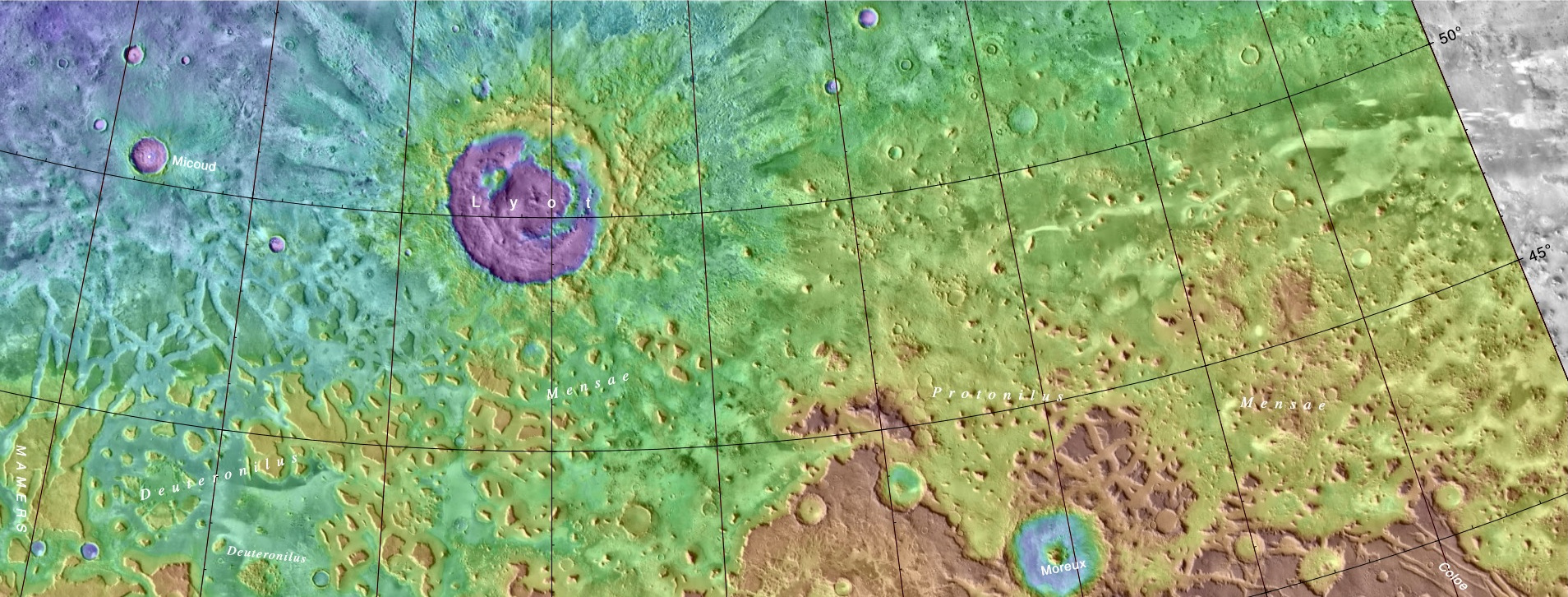
Map showing the relation of Protonilus and Deuteronilus Mensae to other nearby regions. Colors refer to altitudes.

The surface is described as fretted terrain. This terrain contains cliffs, mesas, and wide flat valleys. Surface features are believed to have been caused by debris-covered glaciers. These glaciers are termed lobate debris aprons (LDA) when surrounding mounds and mesas. When glaciers are in valleys, they are called Lineated valley fill (LVF). Parts of the surface show flow patterns that start in numerous alcoves located within the walls of plateaus. Small flow lobes on top of main flows demonstrate that there was more than one glacial period, just as on Earth. It is strongly believed that beneath a thin layer of rock and dust lie vast reservoirs of ice. Radar data from the SHAllow RADar (SHARAD) on board MRO have found pure ice under LDA and LVF.

Some places in Protonilus Mensae display lines of pits. These pits may have formed when ground ice converted to a gas, thus leaving a void. When surface material collapses into voids, pits are created.

== Dunes ==
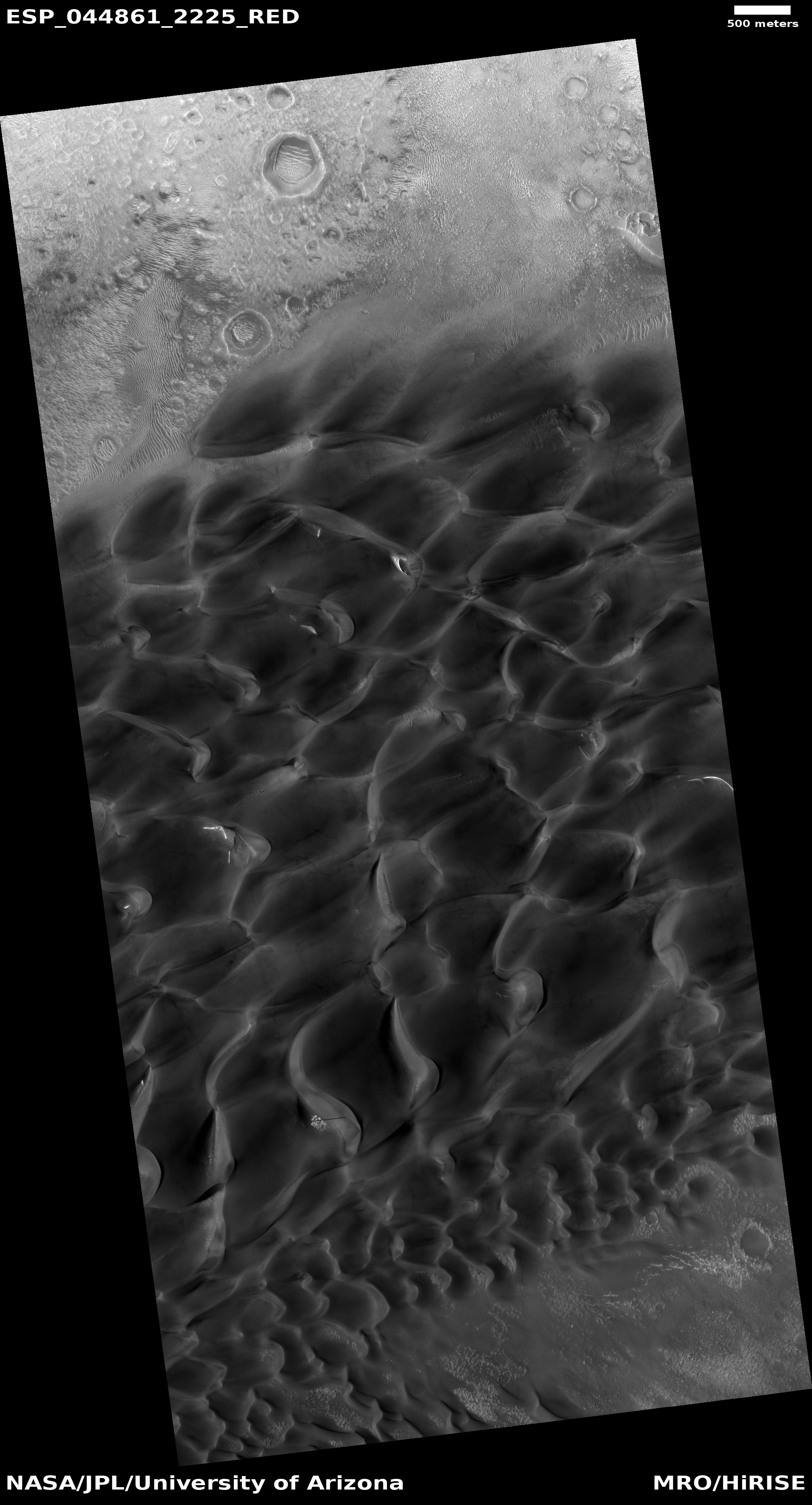
Wide view of dunes in Moreux Crater, as seen by HiRISE under HiWish program

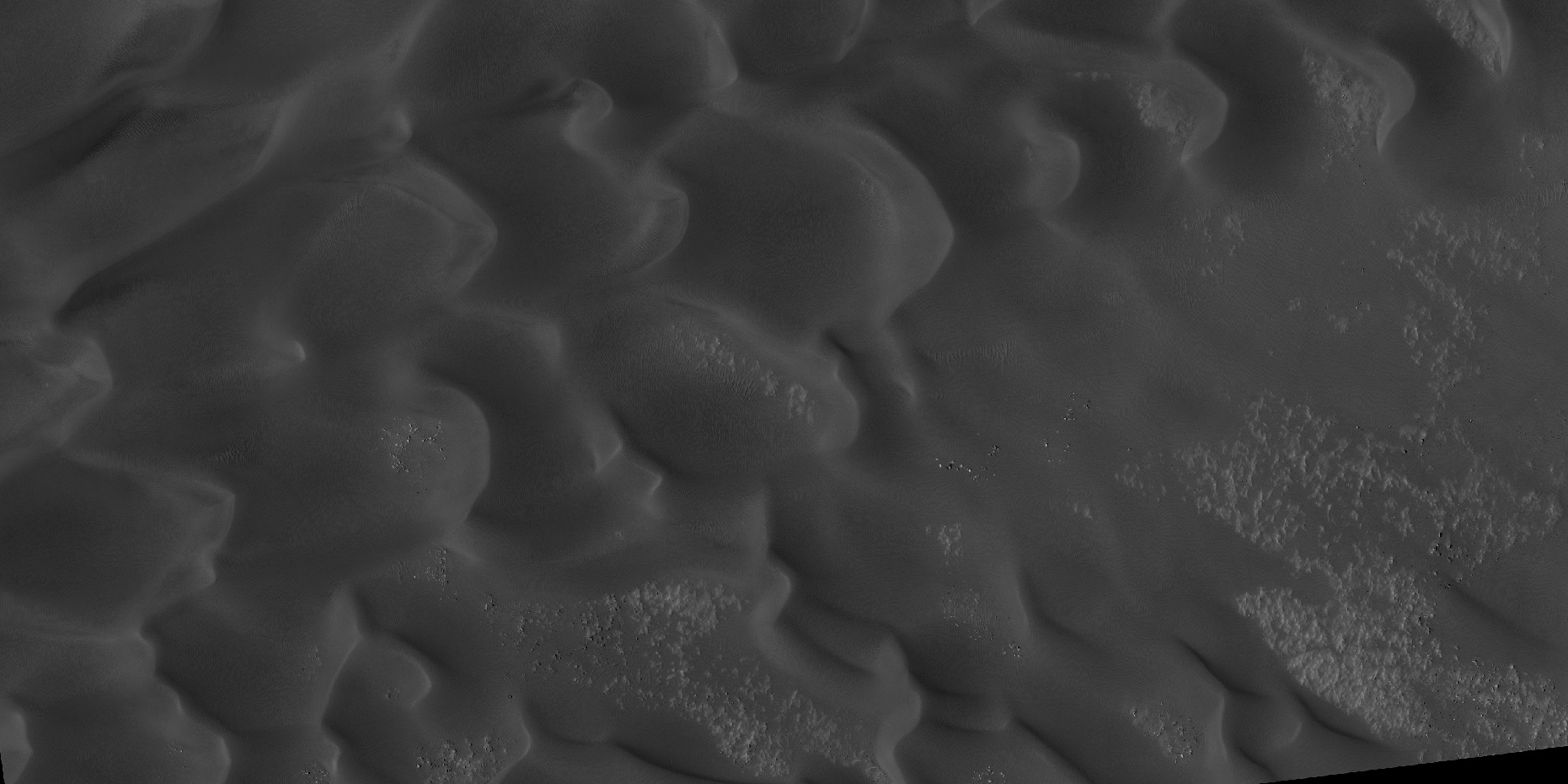
Enlarged view of dunes on the bottom of the previous image, as seen by HiRISE under HiWish program

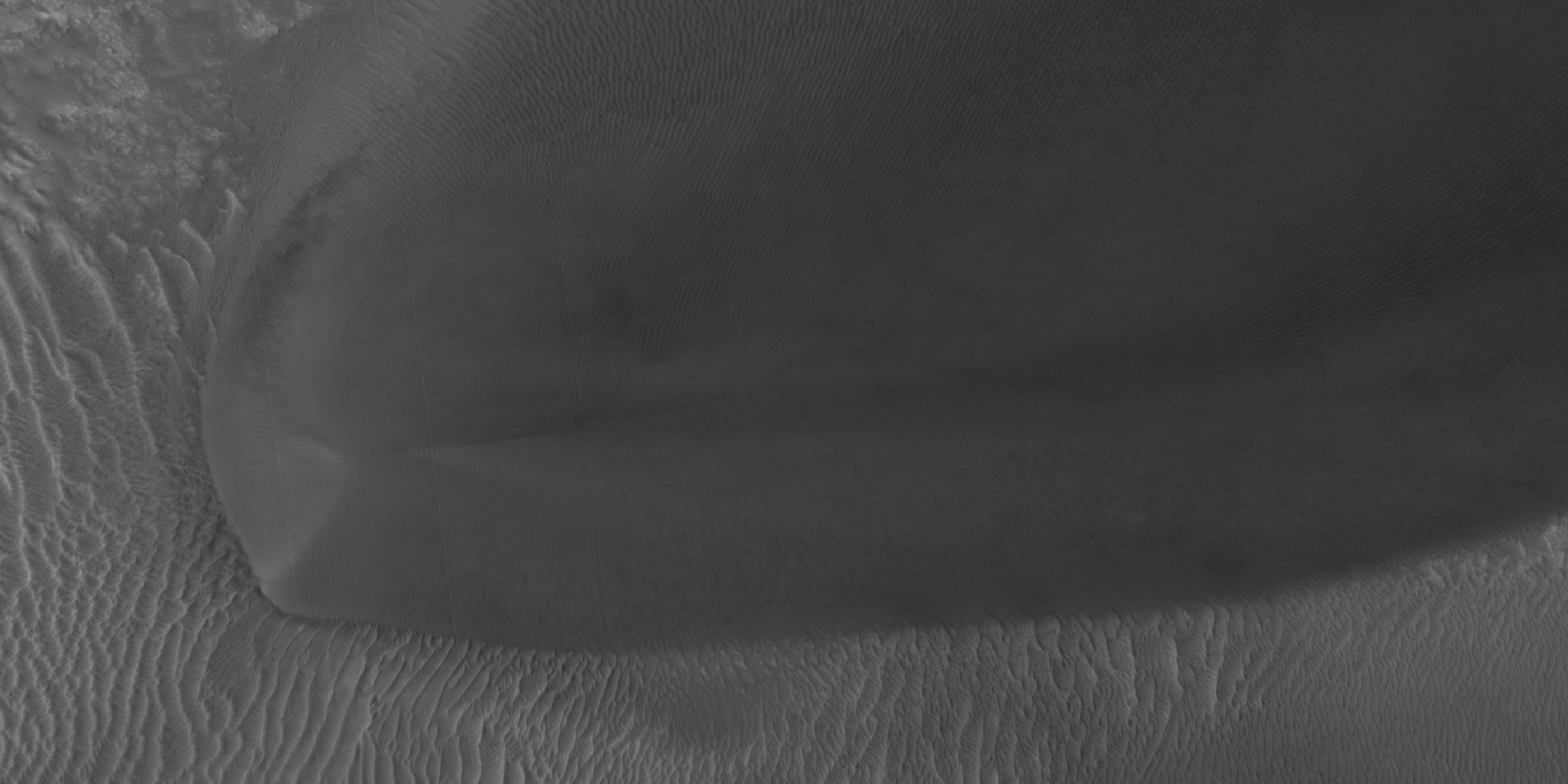
Close view of one large dune from the same location, as seen by HiRISE under HiWish program

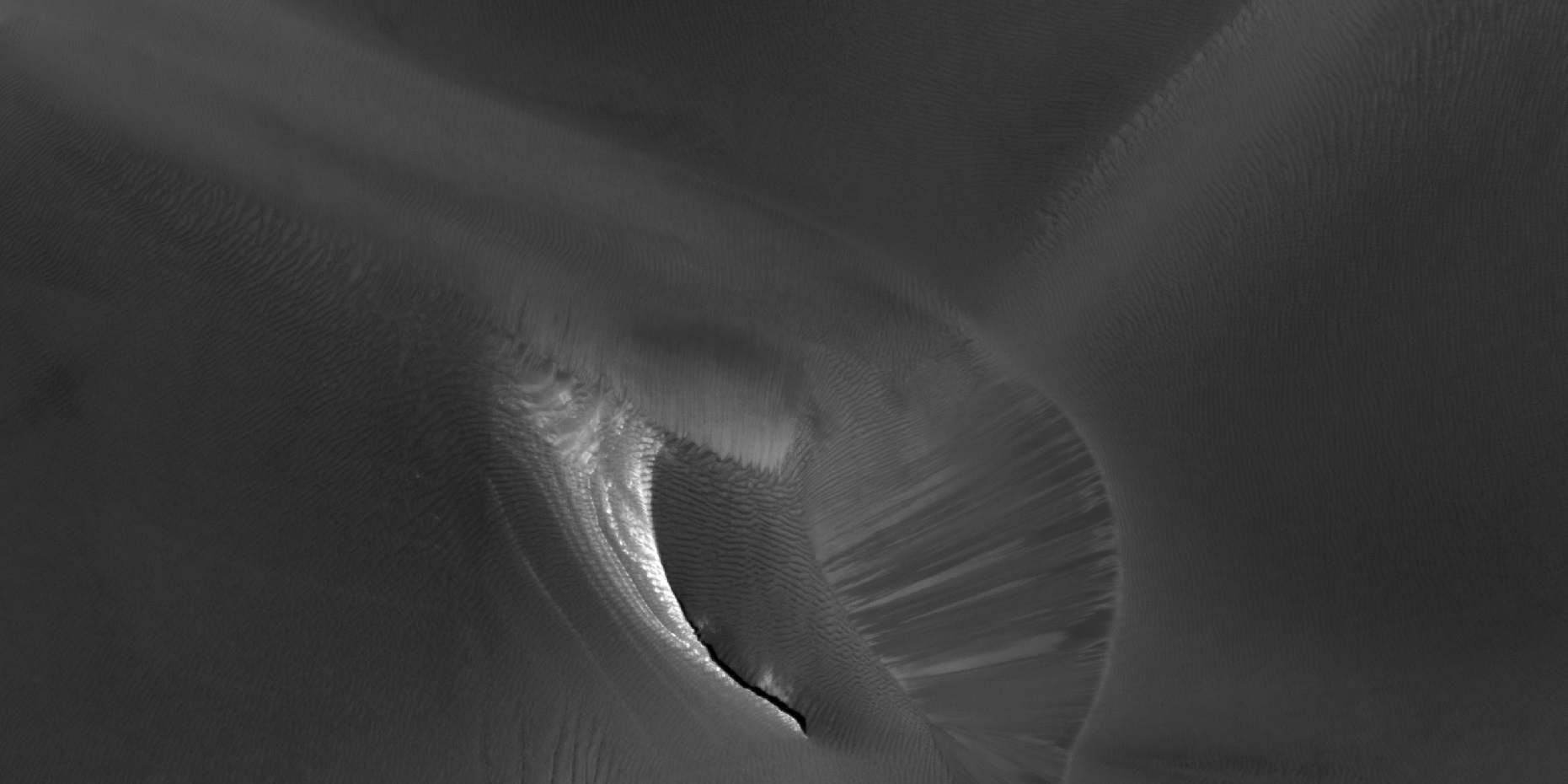
Close view of white spot among the dark dunes showing ripples and streaks

== Climate change caused ice-rich features ==
Many features on Mars, including ones in Protonilus Mensae, are believed to contain large amounts of ice. The most popular model for the origin of the ice is climate change from large changes in the tilt of the planet's rotational axis. At times the tilt has even been greater than 80 degrees Large changes in the tilt explains many ice-rich features on Mars.

Studies have shown that when the tilt of Mars reaches 45 degrees from its current 25 degrees, ice is no longer stable at the poles. Furthermore, at this high tilt, stores of solid carbon dioxide (dry ice) sublimate, thereby increasing the atmospheric pressure. This increased pressure allows more dust to be held in the atmosphere. Moisture in the atmosphere will fall as snow or as ice frozen onto dust grains. Calculations suggest this material will concentrate in the mid-latitudes. General circulation models of the Martian atmosphere predict accumulations of ice-rich dust in the same areas where ice-rich features are found. When the tilt begins to return to lower values, the ice sublimates (turns directly to a gas) and leaves behind a lag of dust. The lag deposit caps the underlying material so with each cycle of high tilt levels, some ice-rich mantle remains behind. Note, that the smooth surface mantle layer probably represents only relative recent material.

== Brain terrain ==
Brain terrain is a region of maze-like ridges 3–5 meters high. Some ridges may consist of an ice core, so they may be sources of water for future colonists.

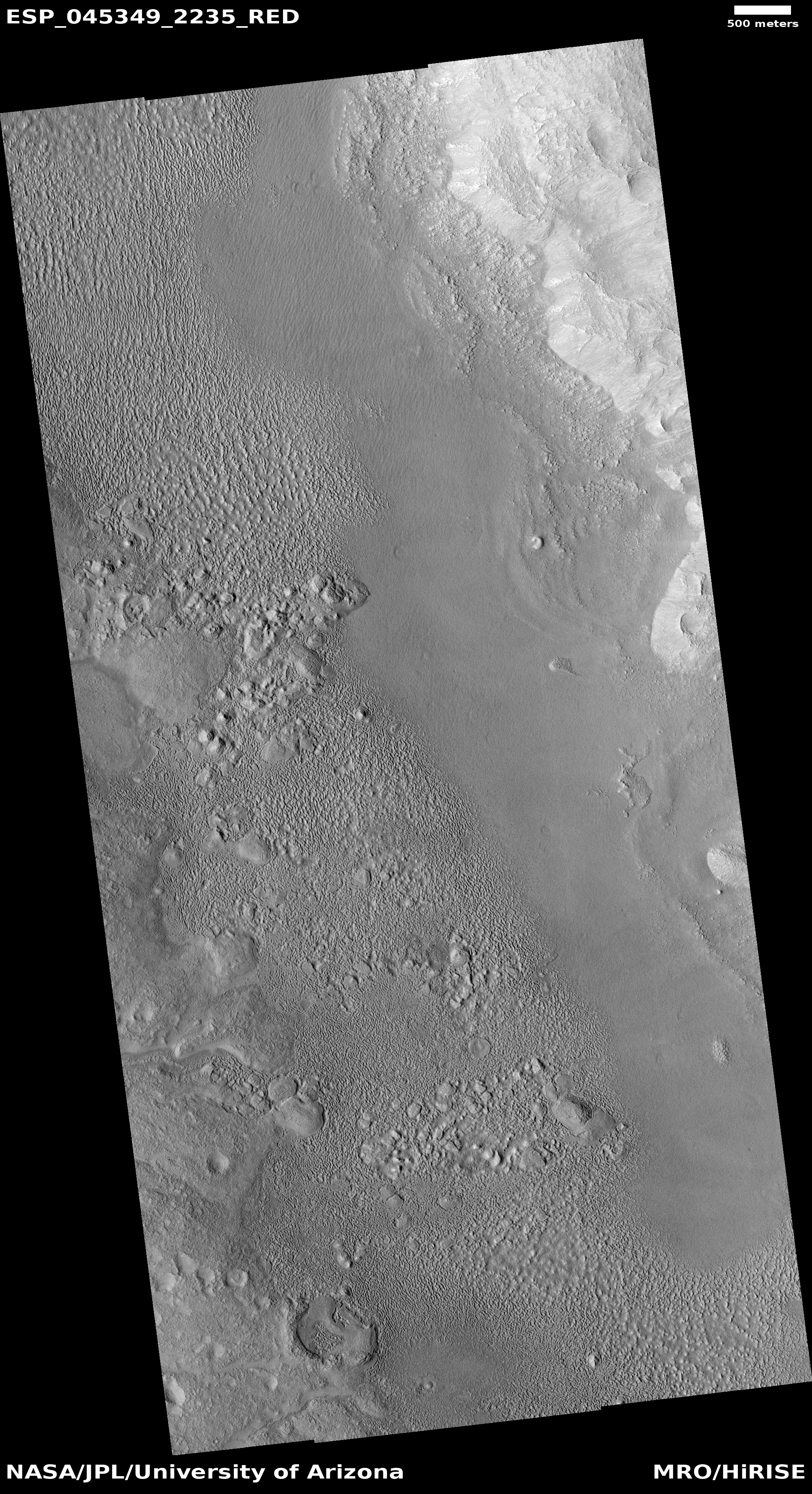
Wide view of brain terrain being formed, as seen by HiRISE under HiWish program

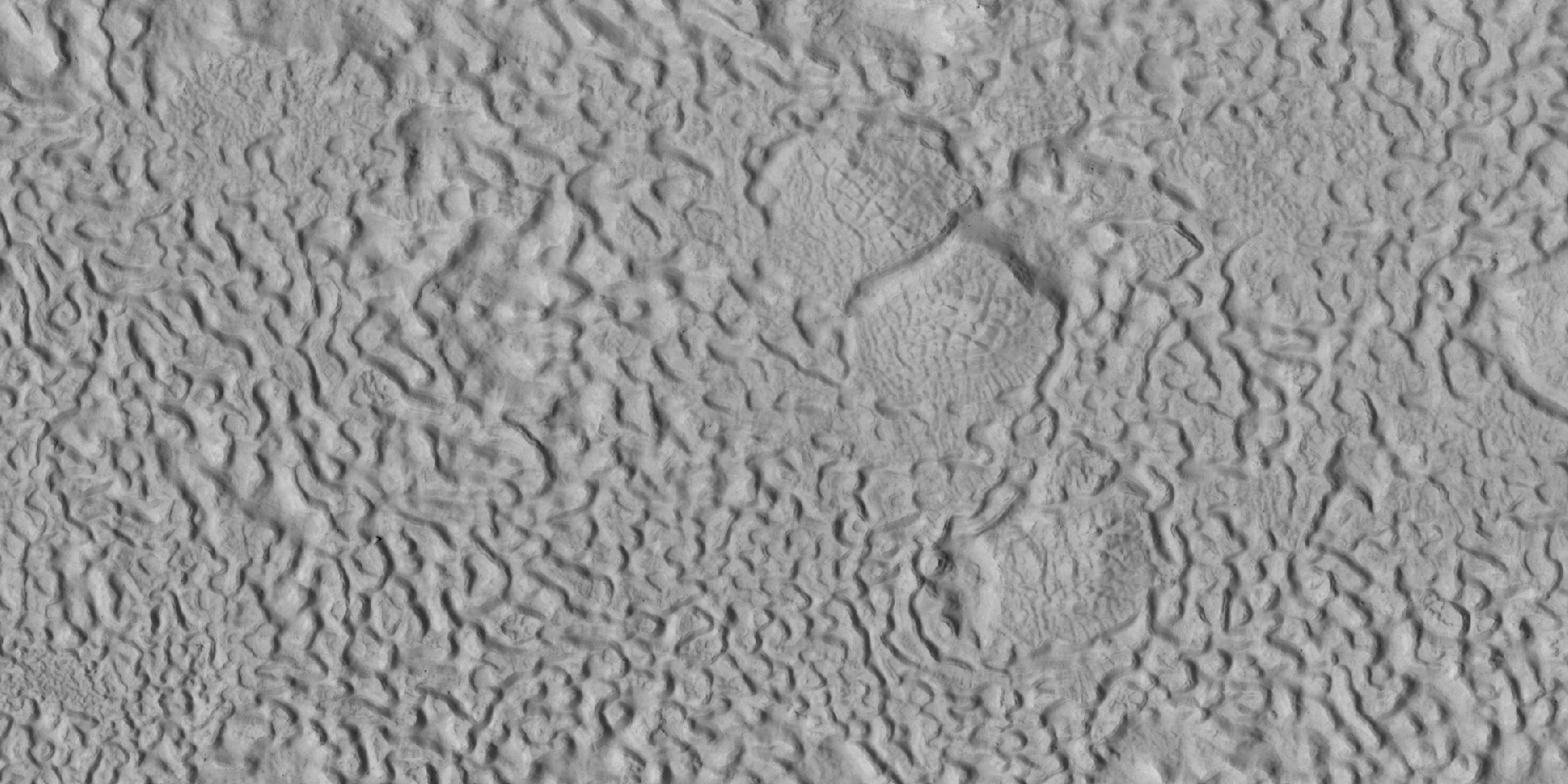
Brain terrain being formed, as seen by HiRISE under HiWish program Note: this is an enlargement of previous image using HiView.

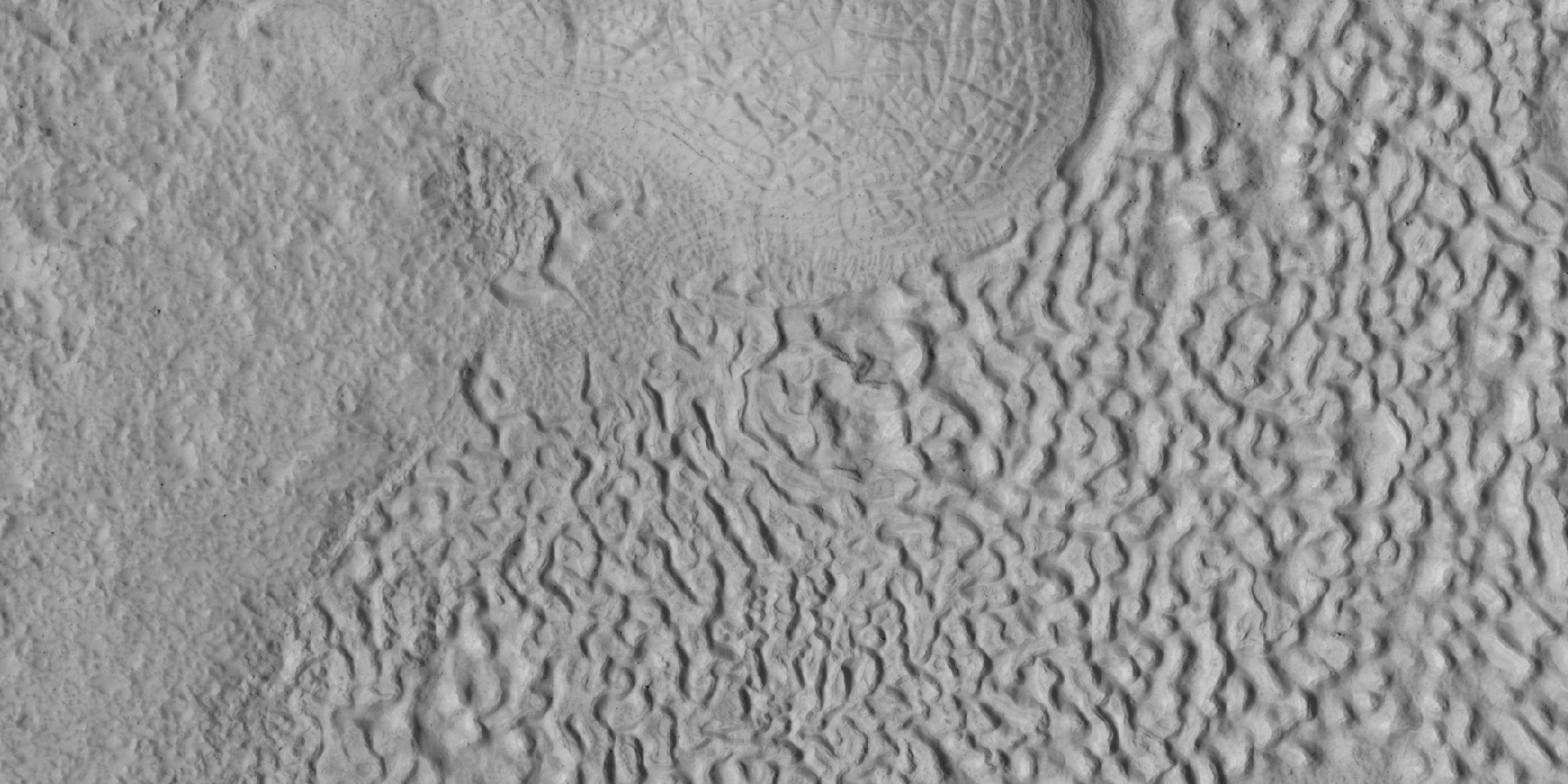
Brain terrain being formed, as seen by HiRISE under HiWish program Note: this is an enlargement of a previous image using HiView.

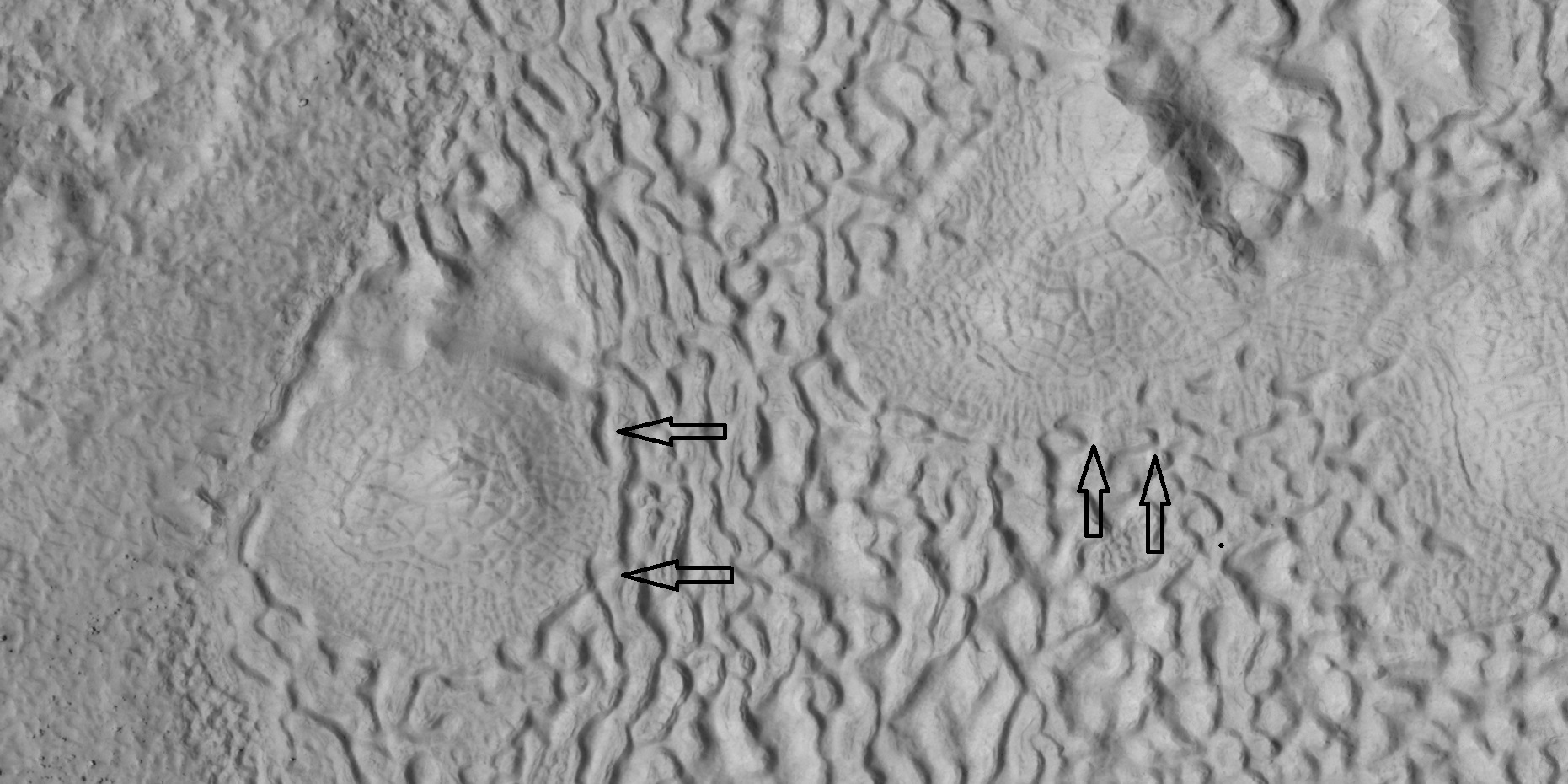
Brain terrain being formed, as seen by HiRISE under HiWish program Note: this is an enlargement of a previous image using HiView. Arrows indicate spots where brain terrain is beginning to form.

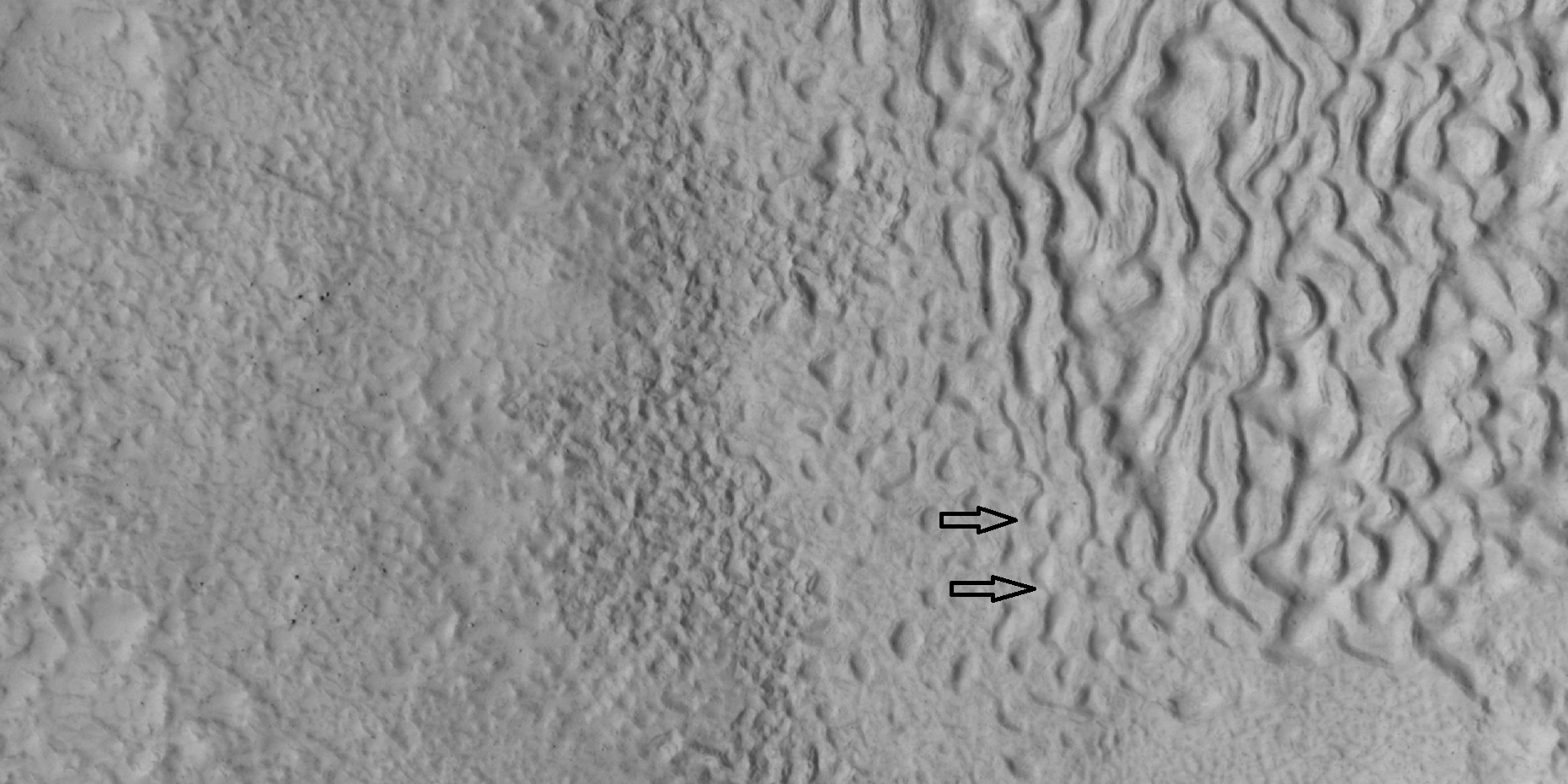
Brain terrain being formed, as seen by HiRISE under HiWish program Note: this is an enlargement of a previous image using HiView. Arrows indicate spots where brain terrain is beginning to form.

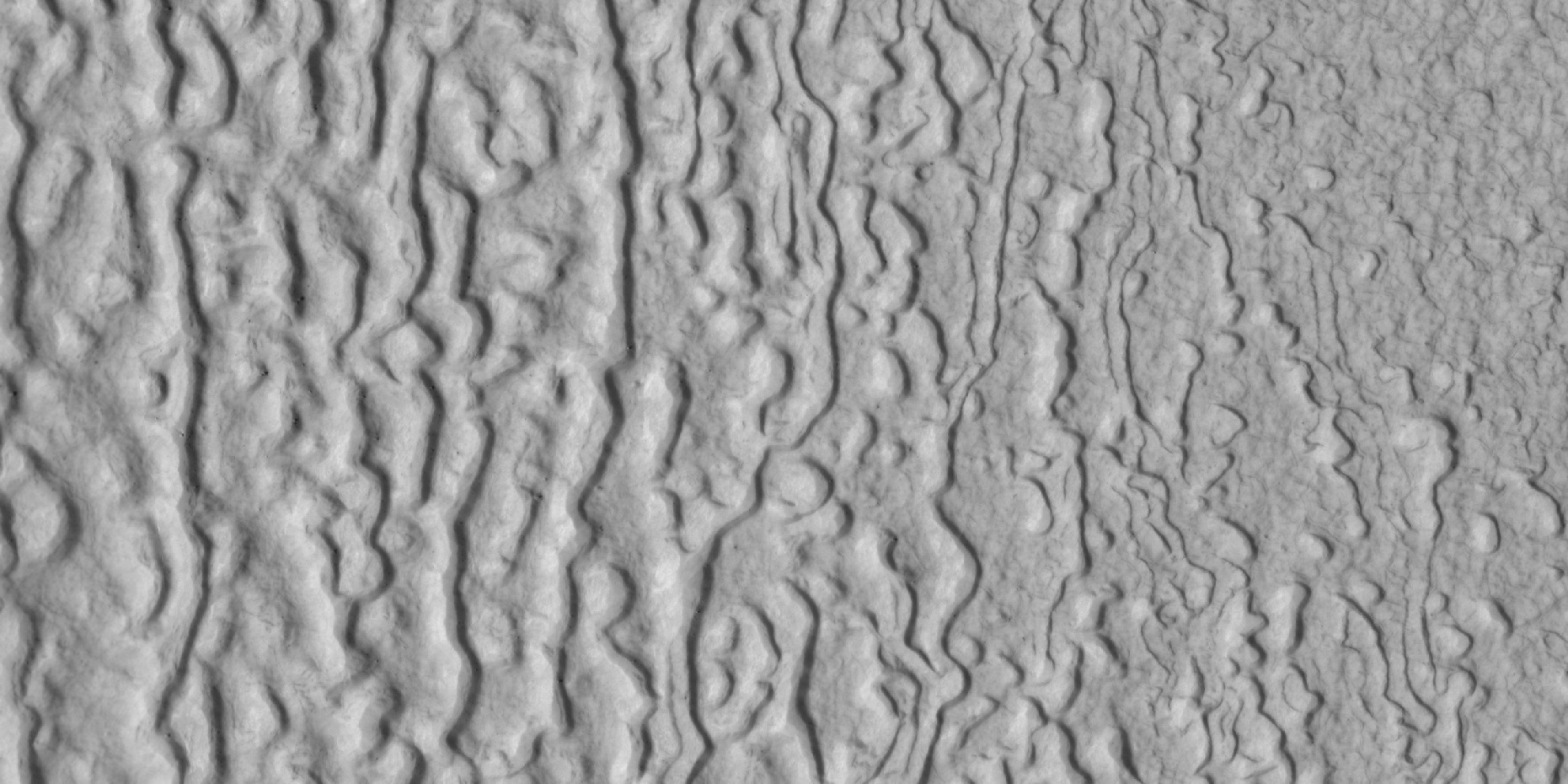
Brain terrain being formed, as seen by HiRISE under HiWish program Note: this is an enlargement of a previous image using HiView.

== Glaciers ==
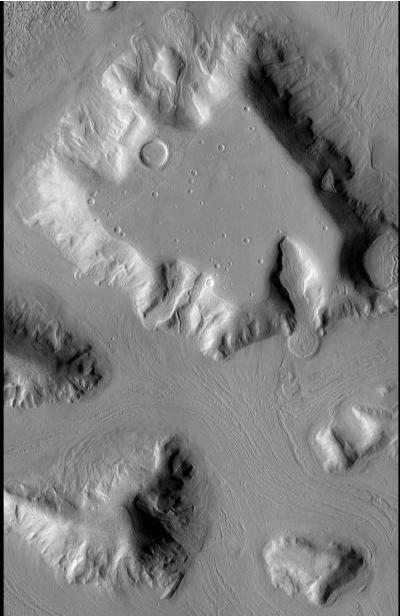
Mesa in Ismenius Lacus quadrangle, as seen by CTX. Mesa has several glaciers eroding it. One of the glaciers is seen in greater detail in the next two images from HiRISE.

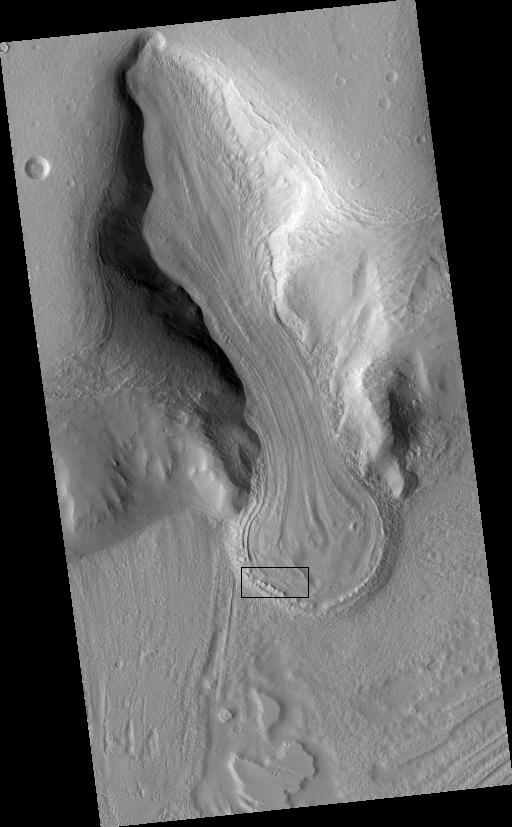
Glacier as seen by HiRISE under the HiWish program. Area in rectangle is enlarged in the next photo. Zone of accumulation of snow at the top. Glacier is moving down valley, then spreading out on plain. Evidence for flow comes from the many lines on surface. Location is in Protonilus Mensae in Ismenius Lacus quadrangle.

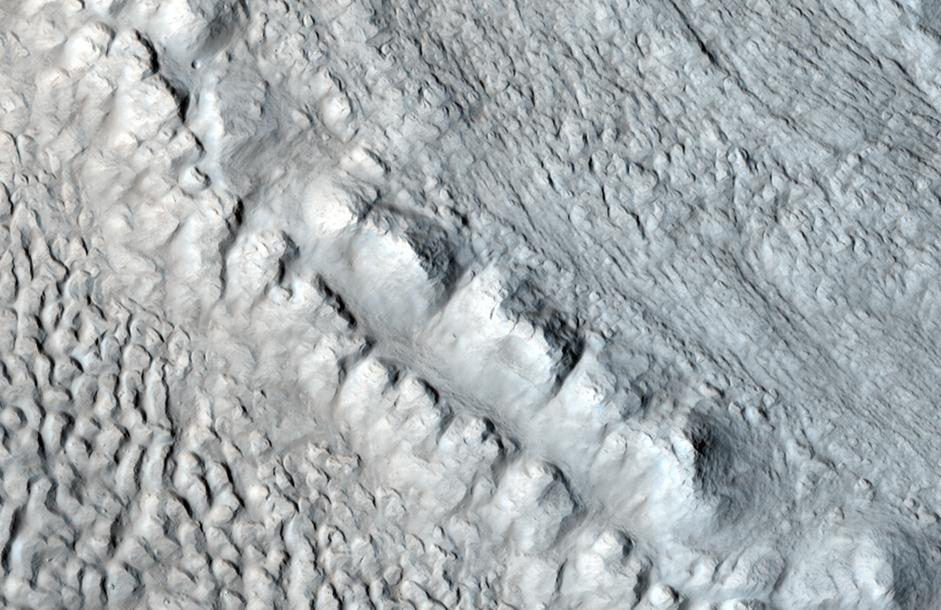
Enlargement of area in rectangle of the previous image. On Earth the ridge would be called the terminal moraine of an alpine glacier. Picture taken with HiRISE under the HiWish program.

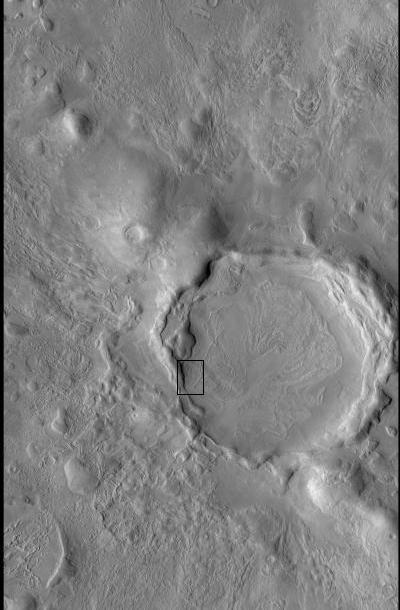
CTX Image in Protonilus Mensae, showing location of next image.

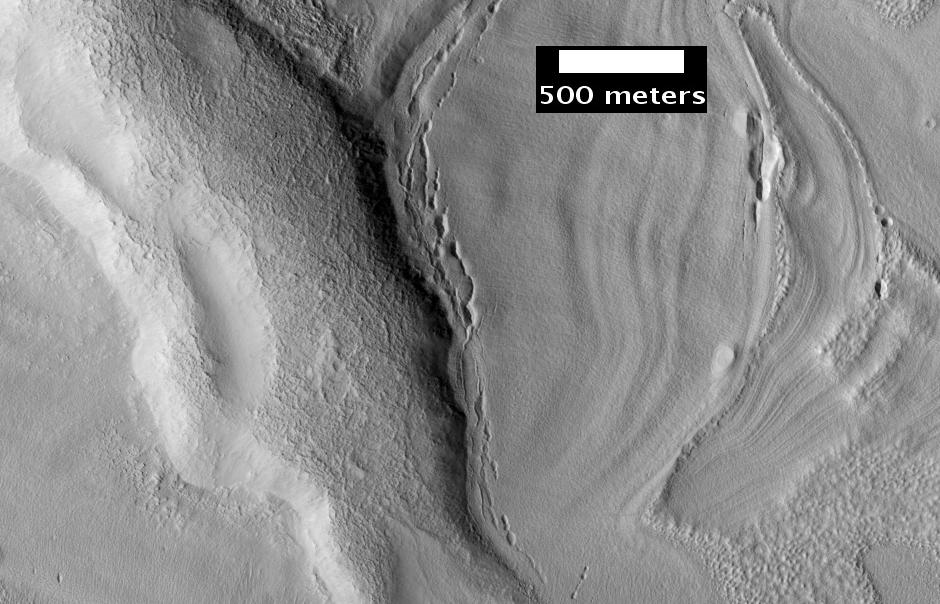
Pits in Protonilus Mensae, as seen by HiRISE, under the HiWish program.

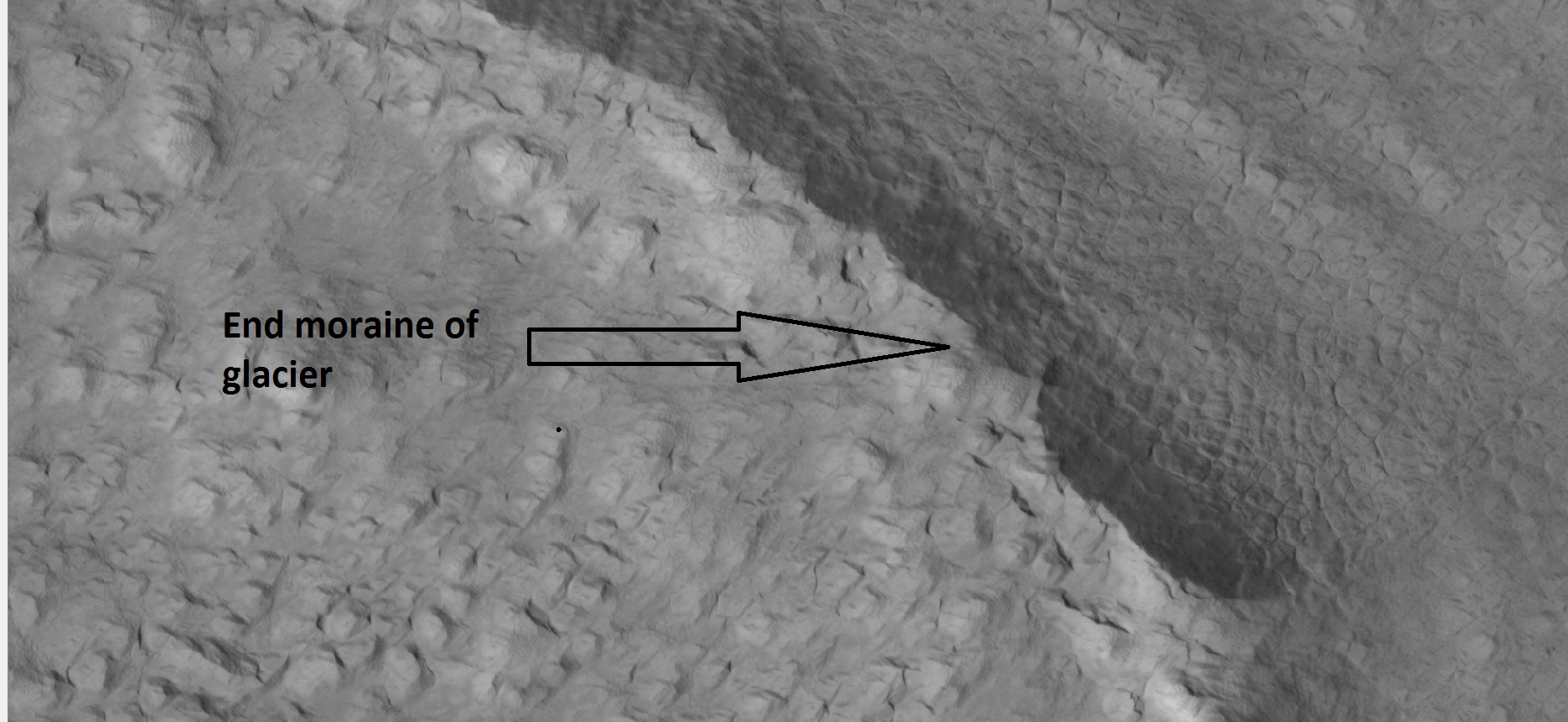
End of a glacier, as seen by HiRISE under HiWish program. Surface to the right of the end moraine exhibits patterned ground, which is common where ground water has frozen.

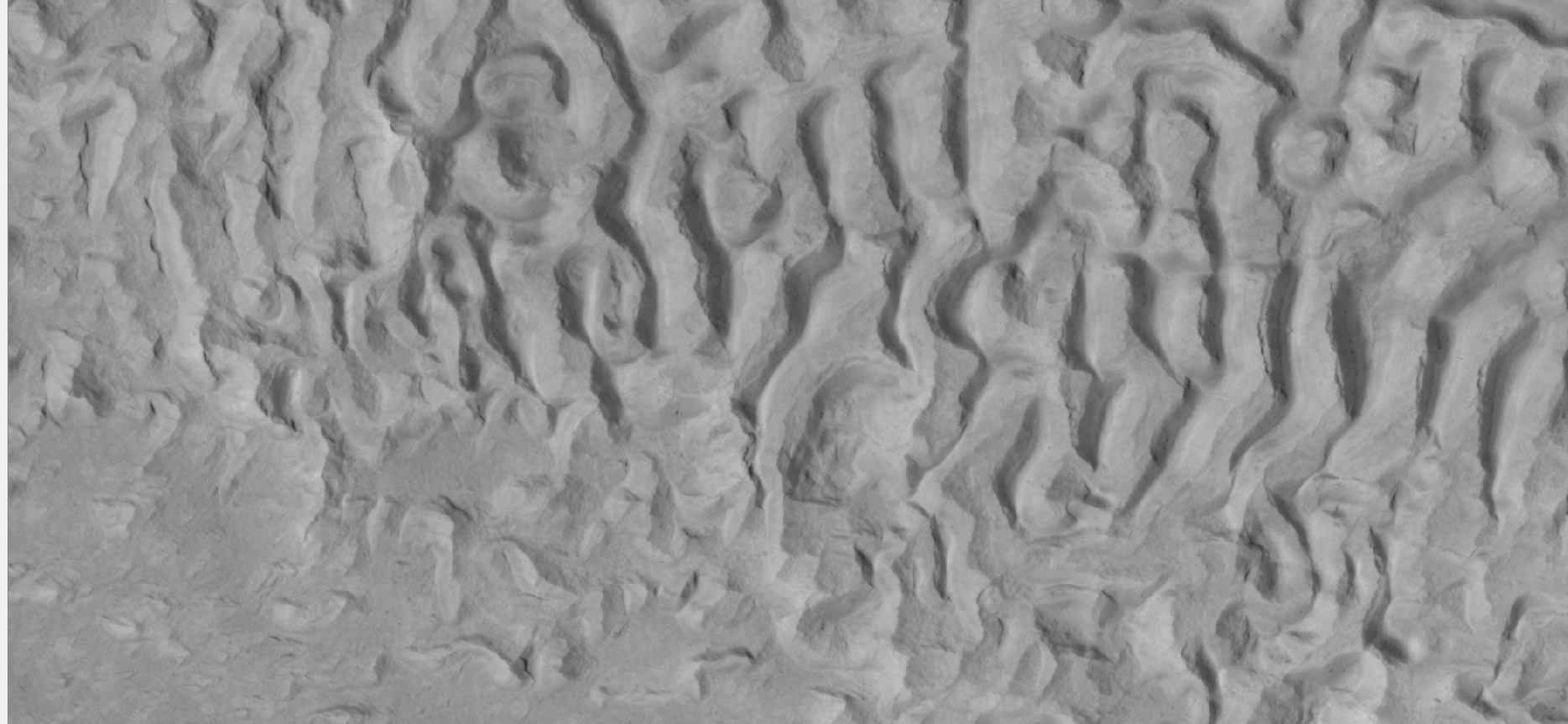
Surface forms in Ismenius Lacus, as seen by HiRISE under HiWish program.
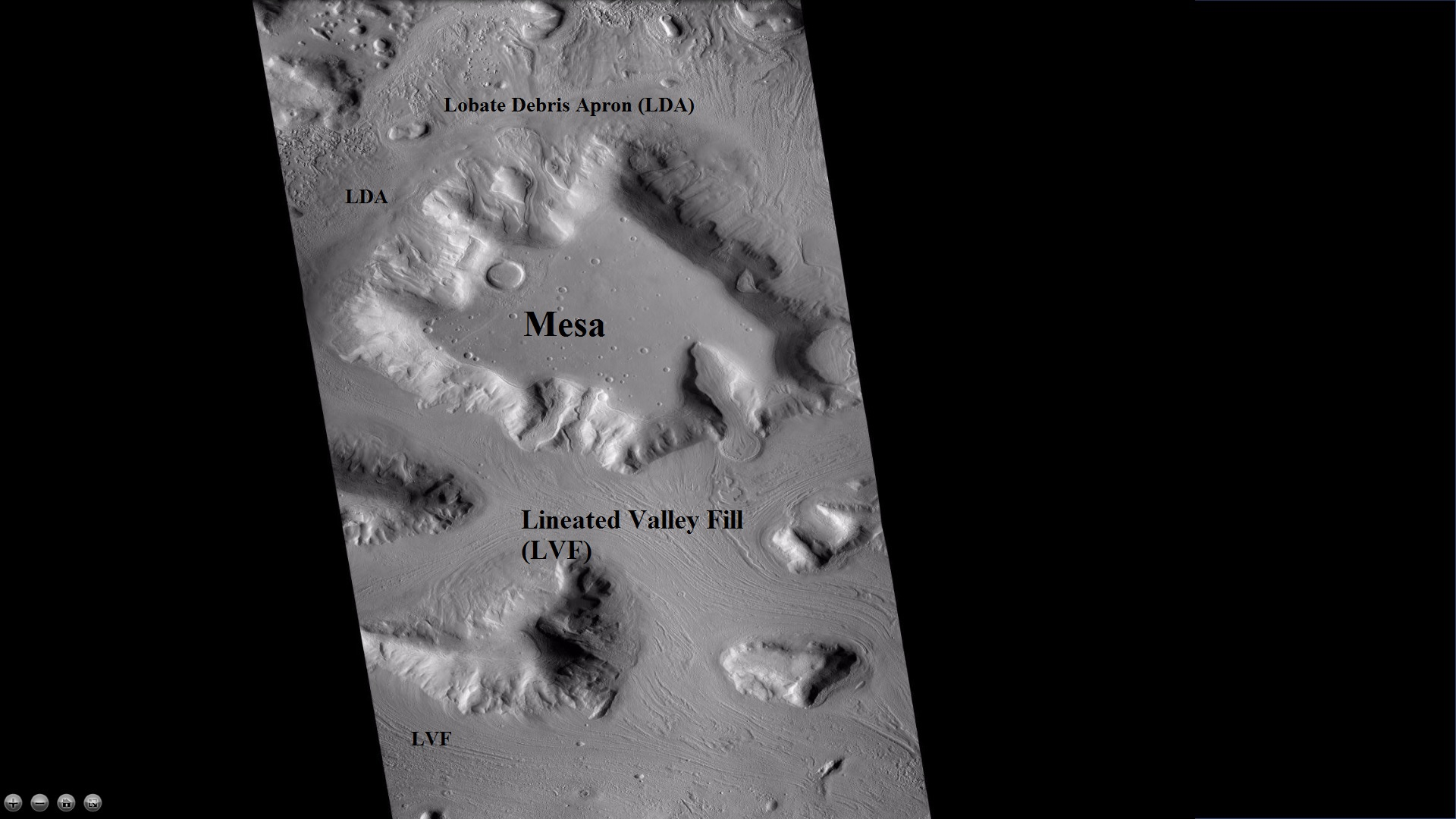
Wide CTX view showing mesa and buttes with Lobate debris aprons and lineated valley fill around them. Location is Ismenius Lacus quadrangle.

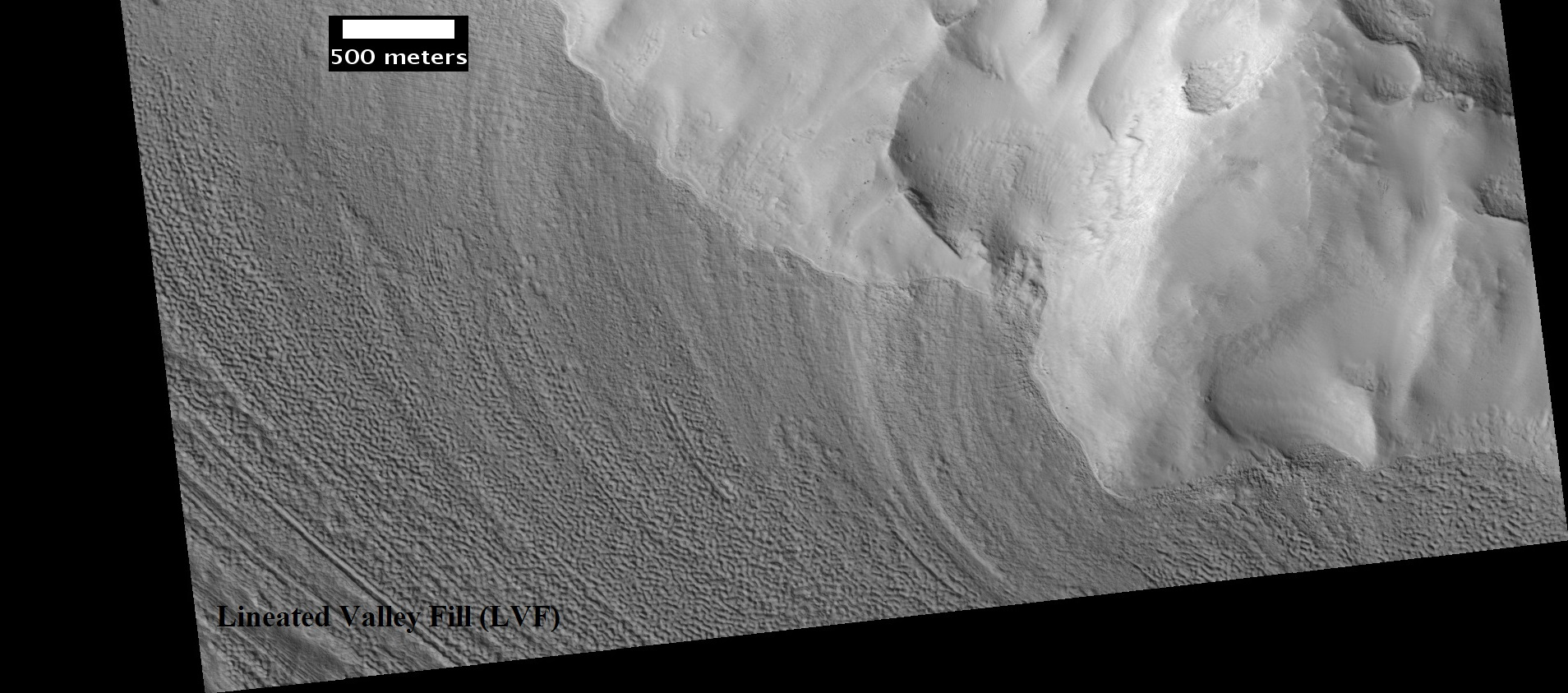
Close-up of lineated valley fill (LVF), as seen by HiRISE under HiWish program. Note: this is an enlargement of the previous CTX image.

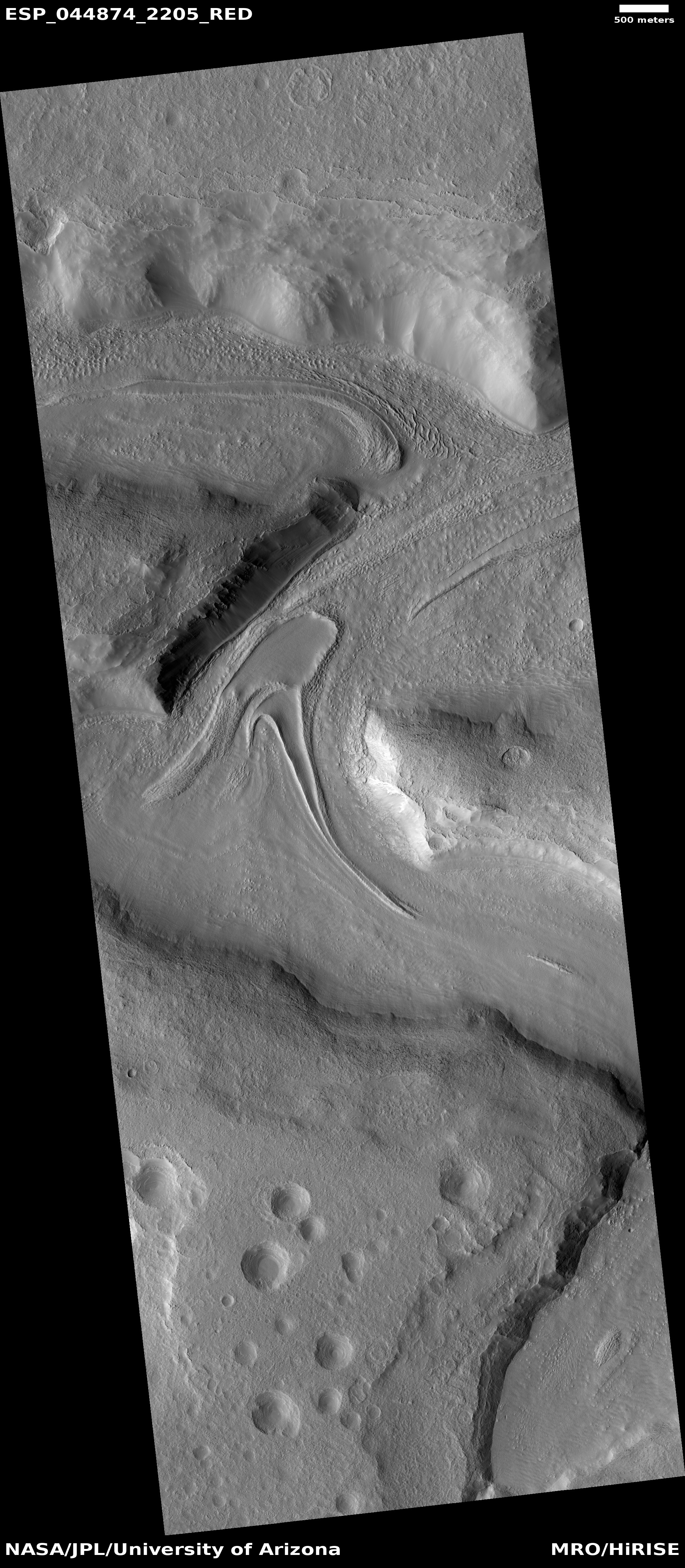
Glaciers moving in two different valleys, as seen by HiRISE under HiWish program

== See also ==
- Deuteronilus Mensae
- Geology of Mars
- Glacier
- Glaciers on Mars
- Martian dichotomy
- Nilosyrtis Mensae
