= Astapus Colles =

Colles on Mars

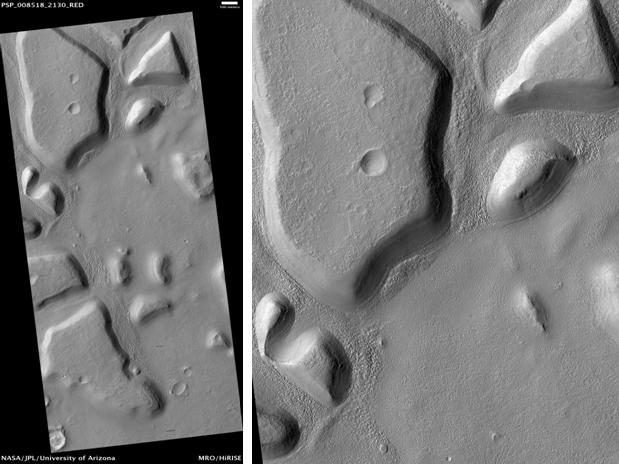
- Astapus Colles Mounds and Knobs, as seen by HiRISE. Scale bar is 500 meters long.
- Coordinates: 35.5°N 272.3°W

Astapus Colles is a group of hills in the Casius quadrangle of Mars, located at 35.5 North and 272.3 West. It is 580 km across and was named after an albedo feature at 35N, 269W. The term "Colles" is used for small hills or knobs.

== Geology ==
Astapus Colles is 80 km thick and rich in ice. It mostly lies on top of the Vastitas Borealis interior unit, although it also overlies portions of the Vastitas Borealis marginal unit; both of these units together make up the greater Vastitas Borealis region. Features of Astapus Colles are both glacial and periglacial in nature, including scalloped depressions, rimless depressions, polygonal ground, raised rims, and potentially pingos and pingo scars.

== Formation ==
Astapus Colles was formed in the late Amazonian period. The region encompassing Astapus Colles is believed to be an early-Amazonian icy mantle that has since been modified by periglacial freeze-thaw cycles; Astapus Colles was then formed later, on top of this mantle, by glacial accumulation and ablation. These processes were facilitated by atmospheric deposition and sublimation, respectively. Because the periglacial processes have also influenced the surrounding regions, the higher abundance of craters in those regions implies they were formed earlier than Astapus Colles, and thus the periglacial processes must have happened first. The glacial processes then created Astapus Colles and eroded the local craters.
