= Nepenthes Mensae =

Martian plateau

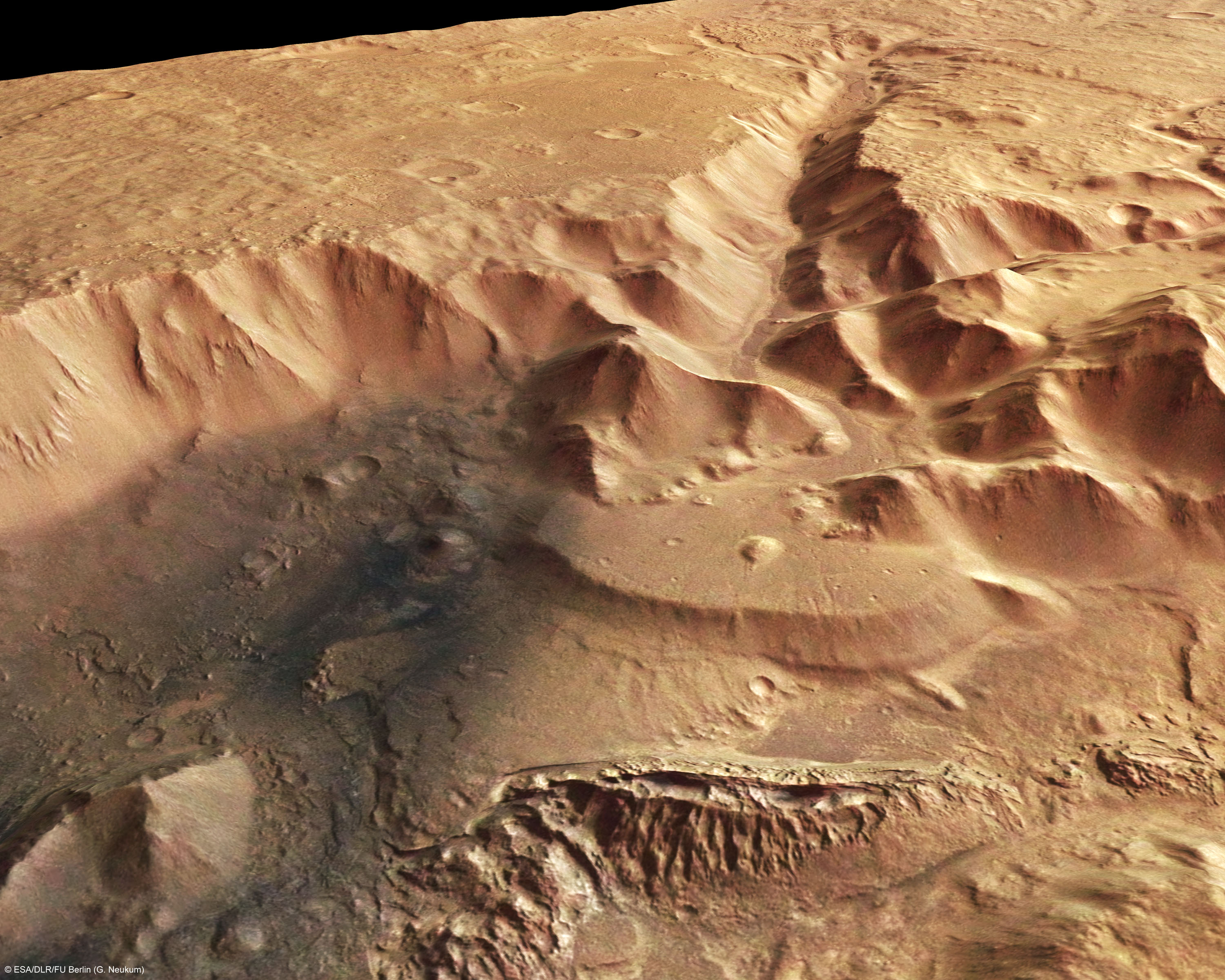
- Nepenthes Mensae - perspective view
- Coordinates: 9.19°N 119.42°E

Nepenthes Mensae is a plateau, and classical albedo feature, in the Amenthes quadrangle of Mars. Its location is centered at 9.19 north latitude and 119.42 east longitude. It is 2,176.23 km (1,352.25 mi) long. The name "Nepenthe" is a Greek word which literally means "without grief" (ne = not, penthos = grief) and, in Greek mythology, is a drug that quells all sorrows with forgetfulness.

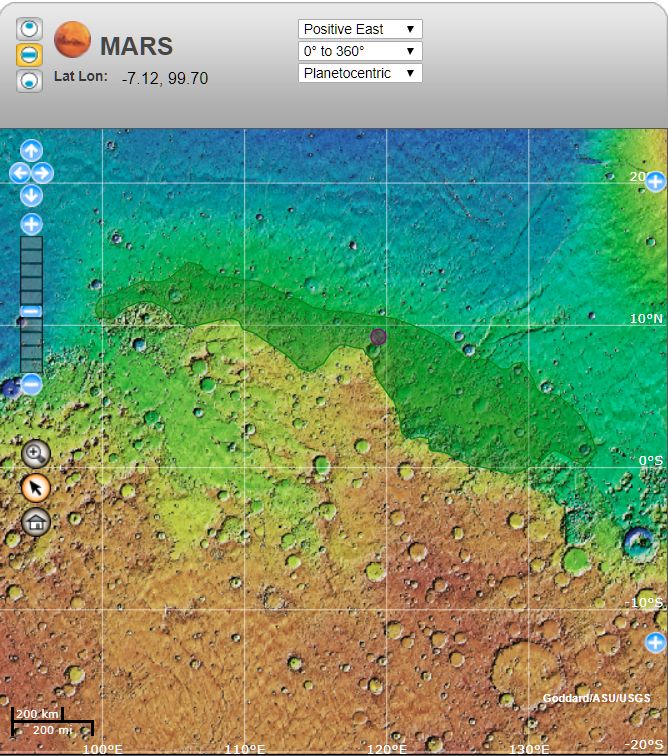
Nepenthes Mensae (dark green) is located in the Amenthes quadrangle

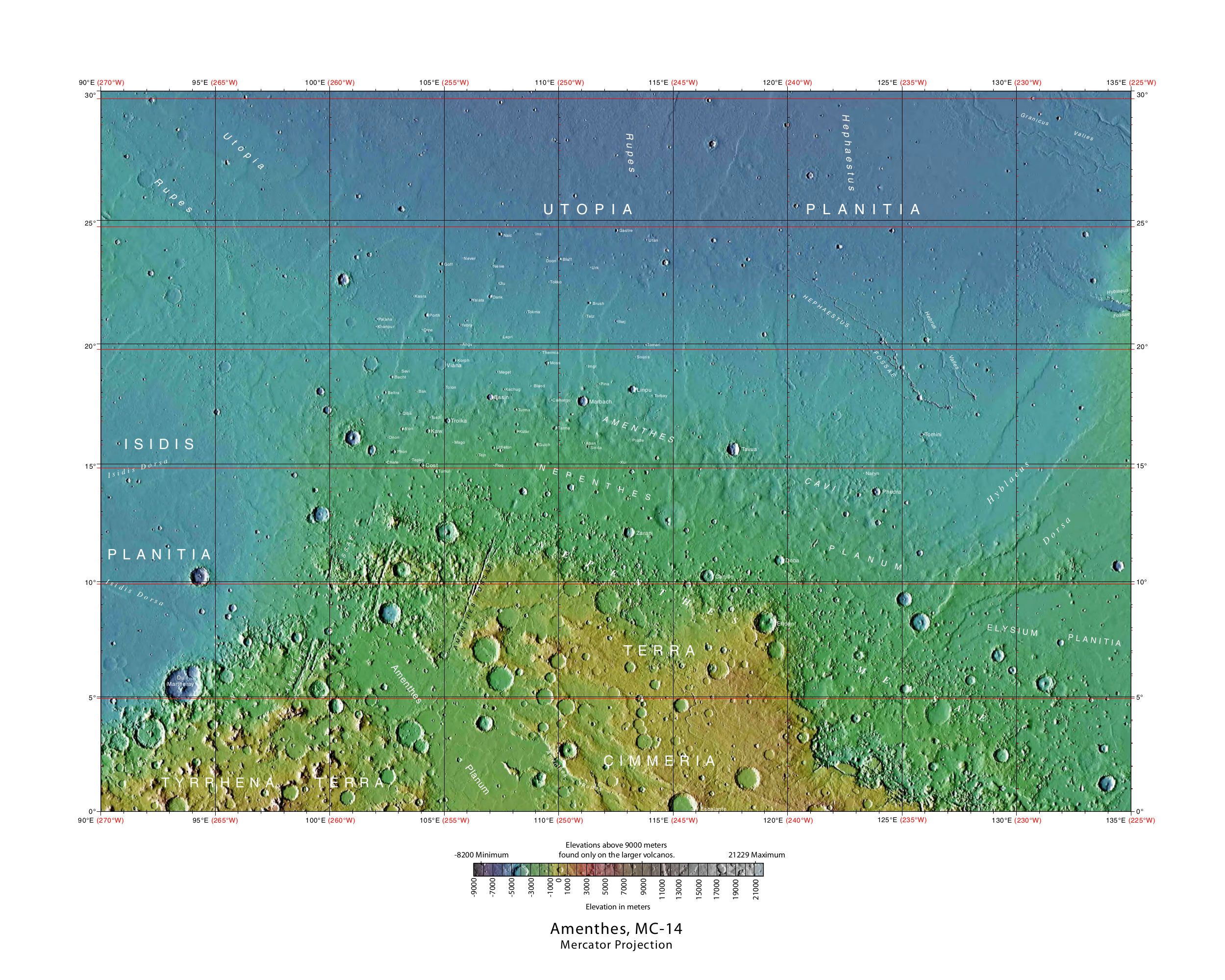
Amenthes quadrangle on the planet Mars

== See also ==
- List of quadrangles on Mars
