= Polygonal patterned ground =

Polygonal, patterned ground is quite common in some regions of Mars. It is commonly believed to be caused by the sublimation of ice from the ground. Sublimation is the direct change of solid ice to a gas. This is similar to what happens to dry ice on the Earth. Places on Mars that display polygonal ground may indicate where future colonists can find water ice. Low center polygons have been proposed as a marker for ground ice.

Patterned ground forms in a mantle layer, called latitude dependent mantle, that fell from the sky when the climate was different.

On Mars, researches have found patterned ground that formed from fractures and patterned ground formed by the arrangement of boulders. It is not yet clear what caused boulders to form patterns, but it does not seem that fractures caused the boulders to move around.

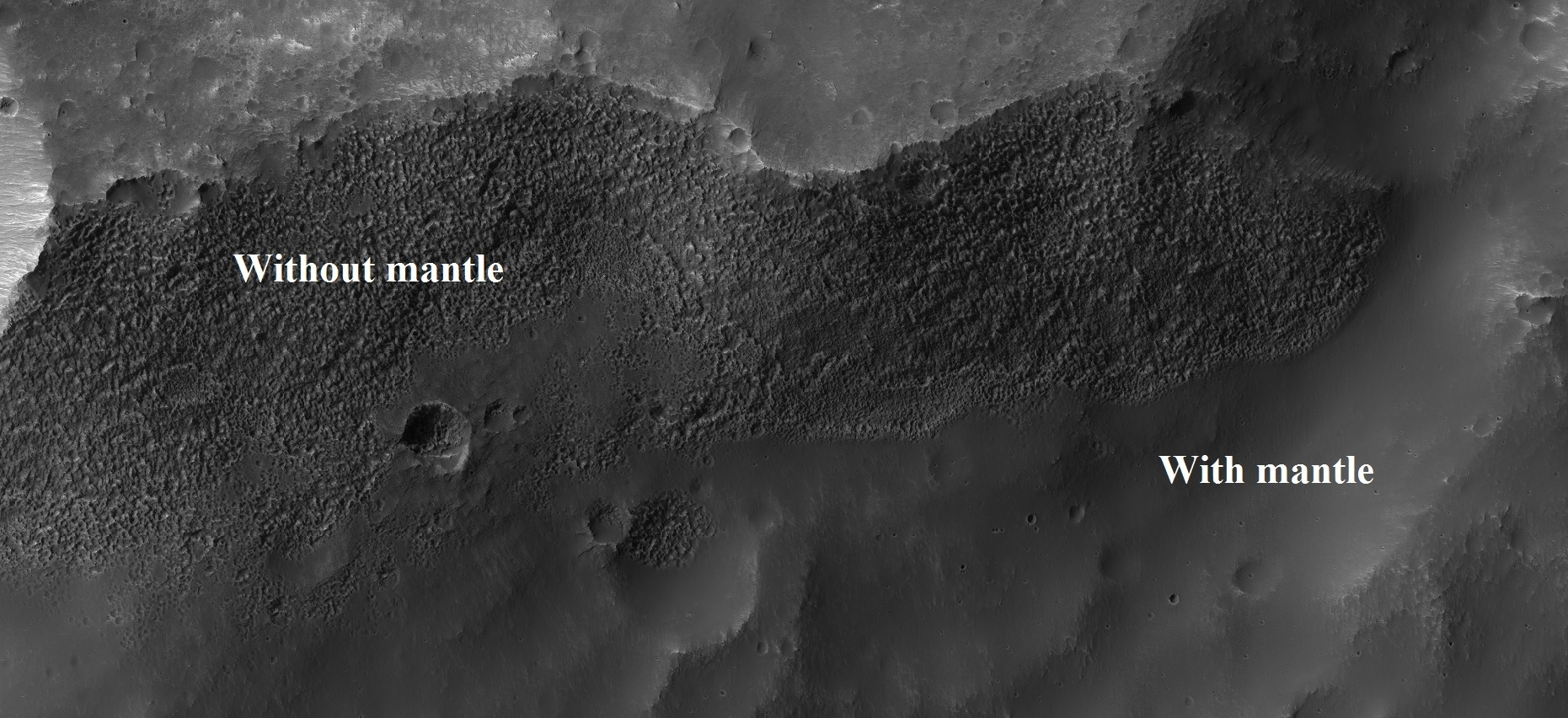
Surface showing appearance with and without mantle covering, as seen by HiRISE, under the HiWish program. Location is Terra Sirenum in Phaethontis quadrangle.

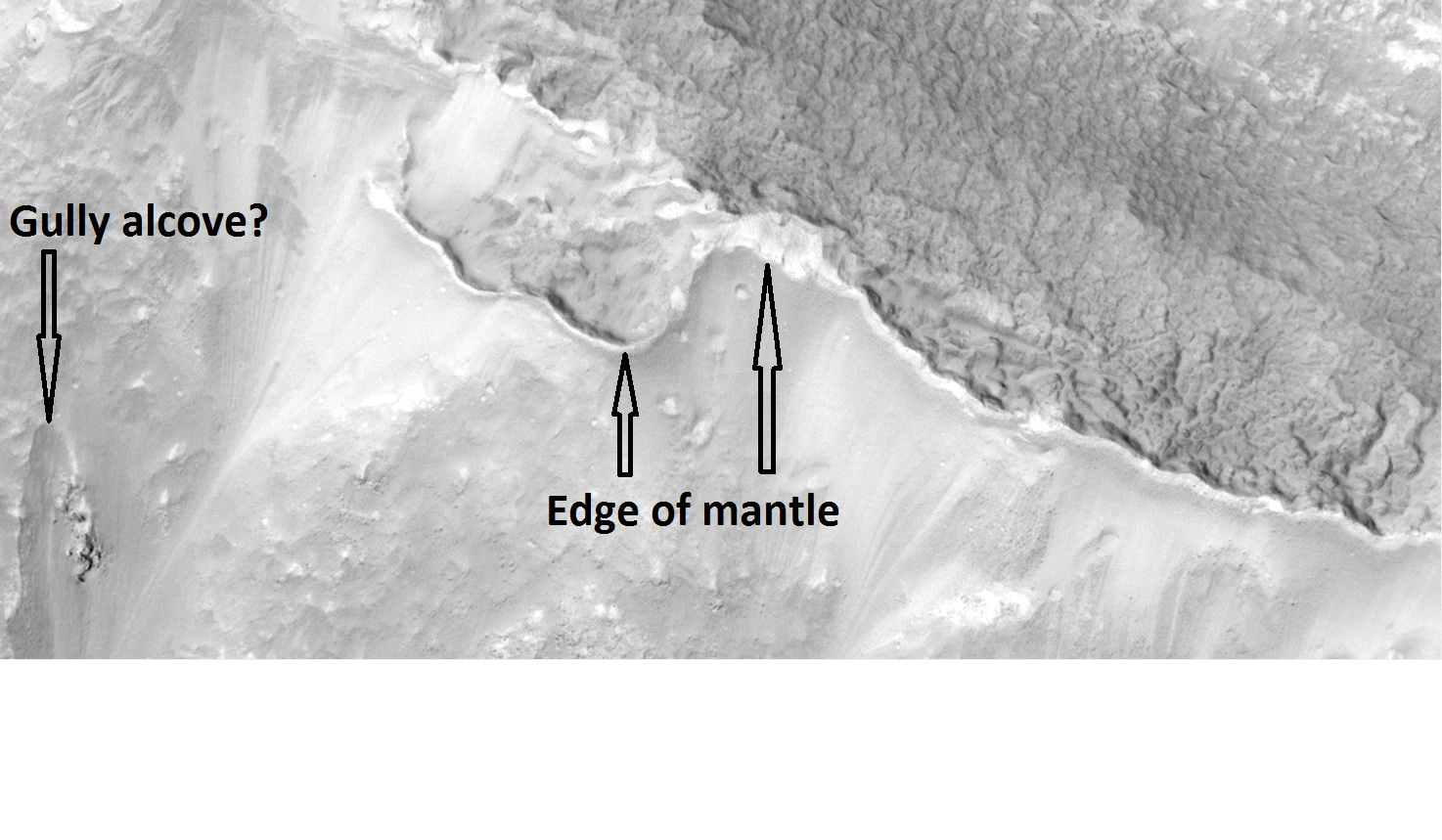
Close up view of mantle, as seen by HiRISE under the HiWish program. Mantle may be composed of ice and dust that fell from the sky during past climatic conditions. Location is Cebrenia quadrangle.

== Physics ==
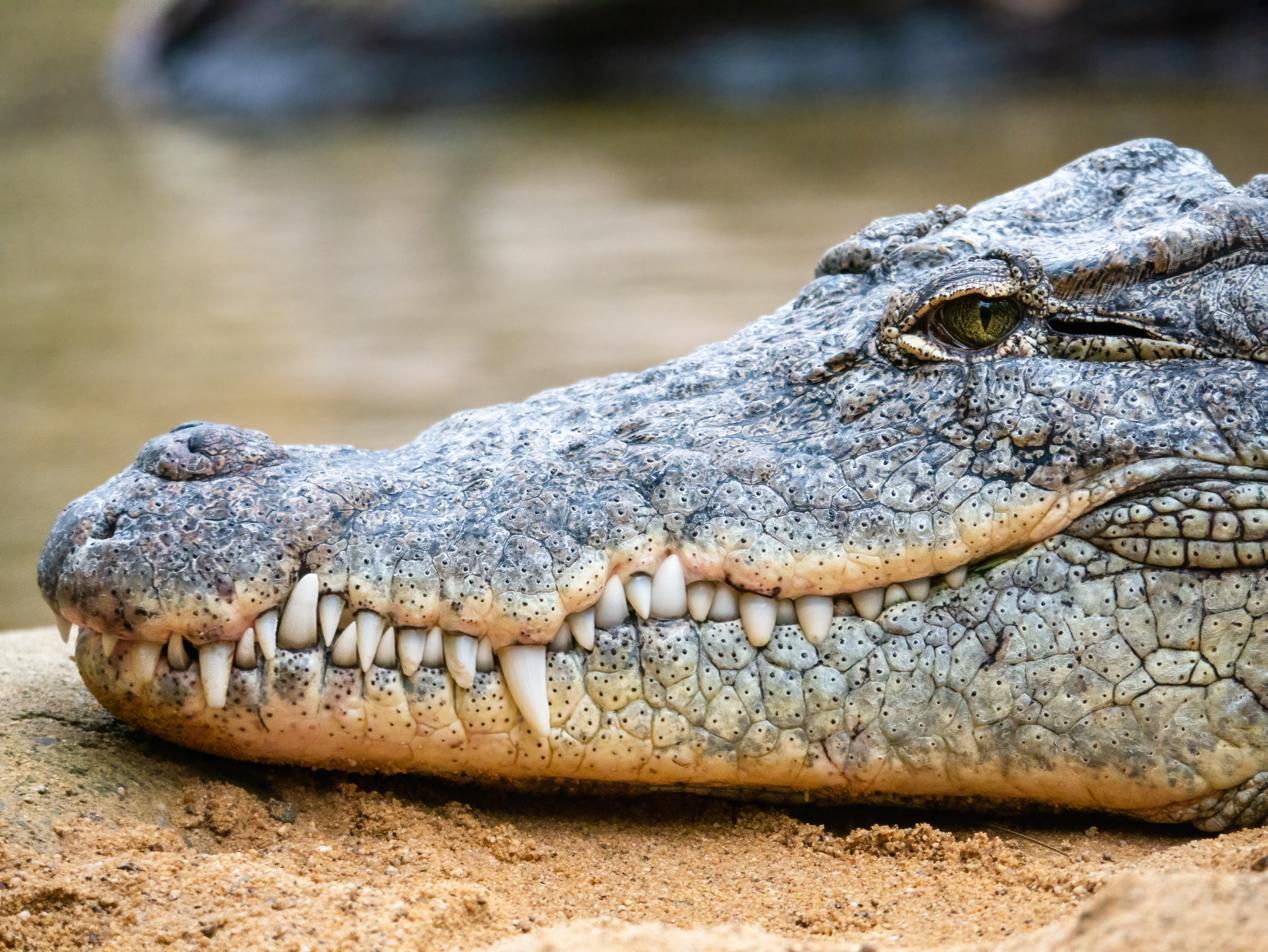
A similar process occurs on Nile crocodiles. Their snout skins crack during embryo development, forming polygonal patterns.

Unlike mudcracks, which are dominated by T-junctions, polygonal terrain is dominated by Y-junctions. It is formed by repeatedly annealing the crack pattern, as the same ground is partially melted every summer, then frozen every winter, until thousands of years later, it settles into a thermodynamically favored state, which is dominated by Y-junctions. This is similar to columnar jointing.

== Polygons in Mare Australe quadrangle ==
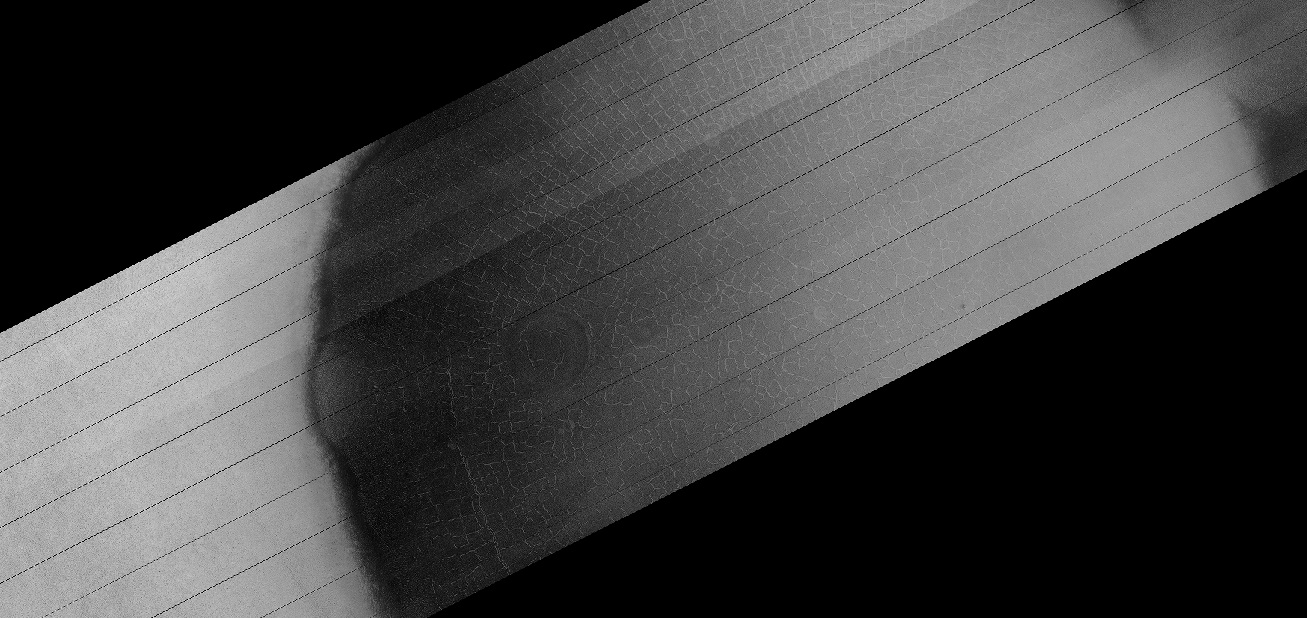
Wide view of crater containing polygons with frost in the low parts, as seen by HiRISE under the HiWish program

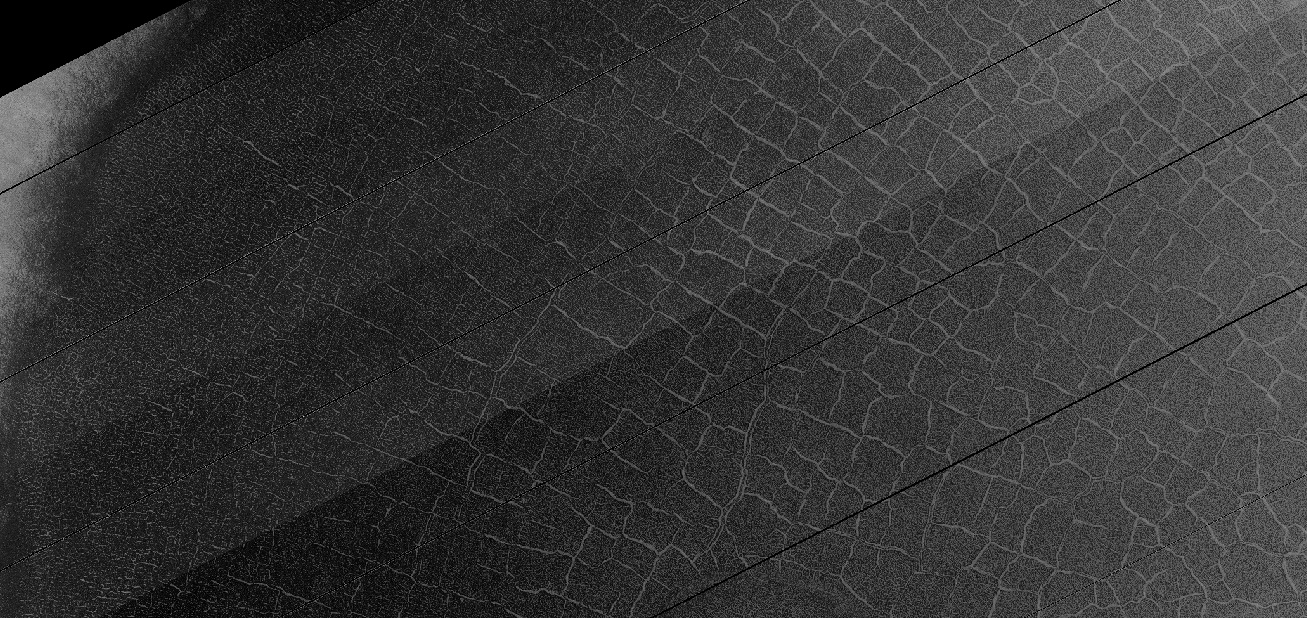
Closer view of polygons with frost in the low parts, as seen by HiRISE under the HiWish program

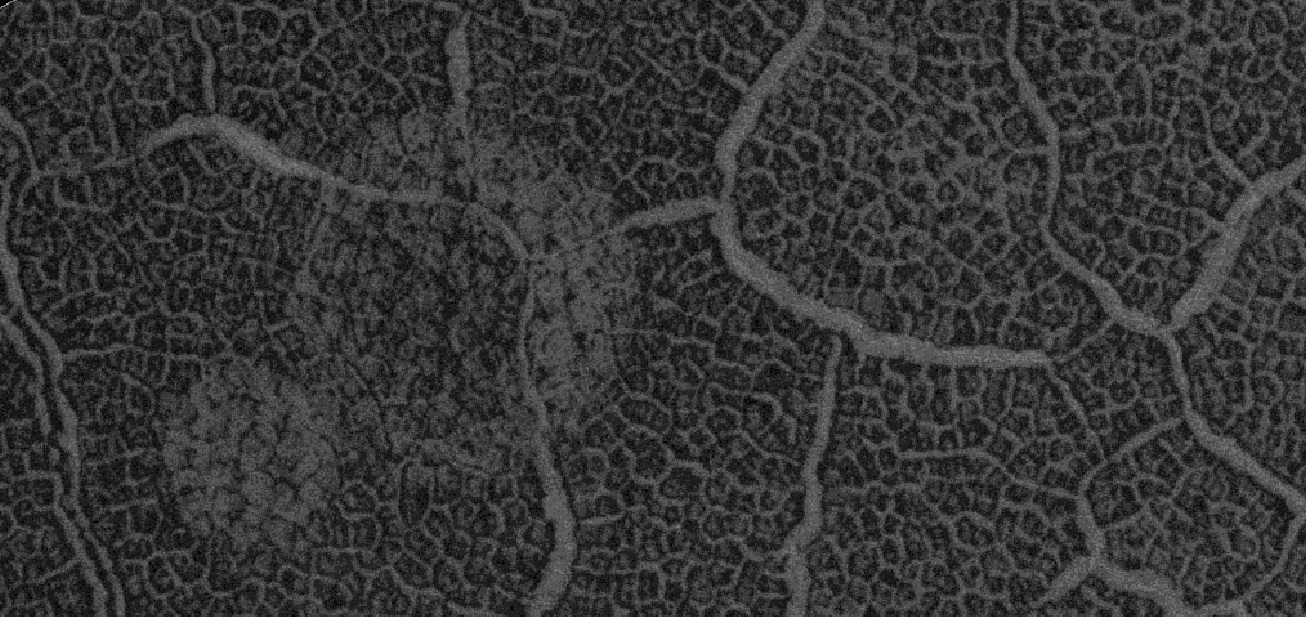
Close view of polygons with frost in the low parts, as seen by HiRISE under the HiWish program Circular shapes are also visible.

== Polygons in Casius quadrangle ==
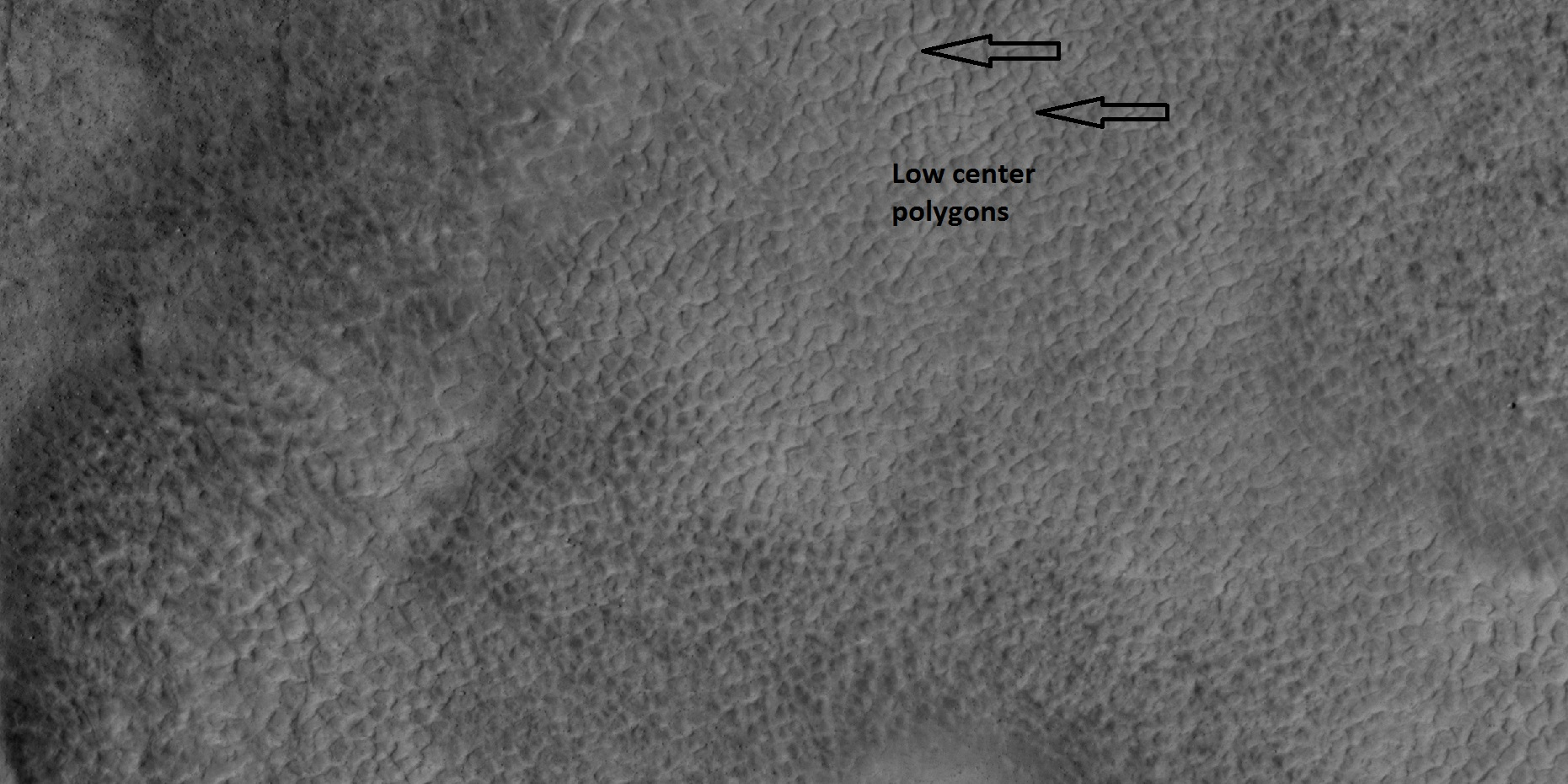
Low center polygons, shown with arrows, as seen by HiRISE under HiWish program Location is Casius quadrangle. Image was enlarged with HiView.

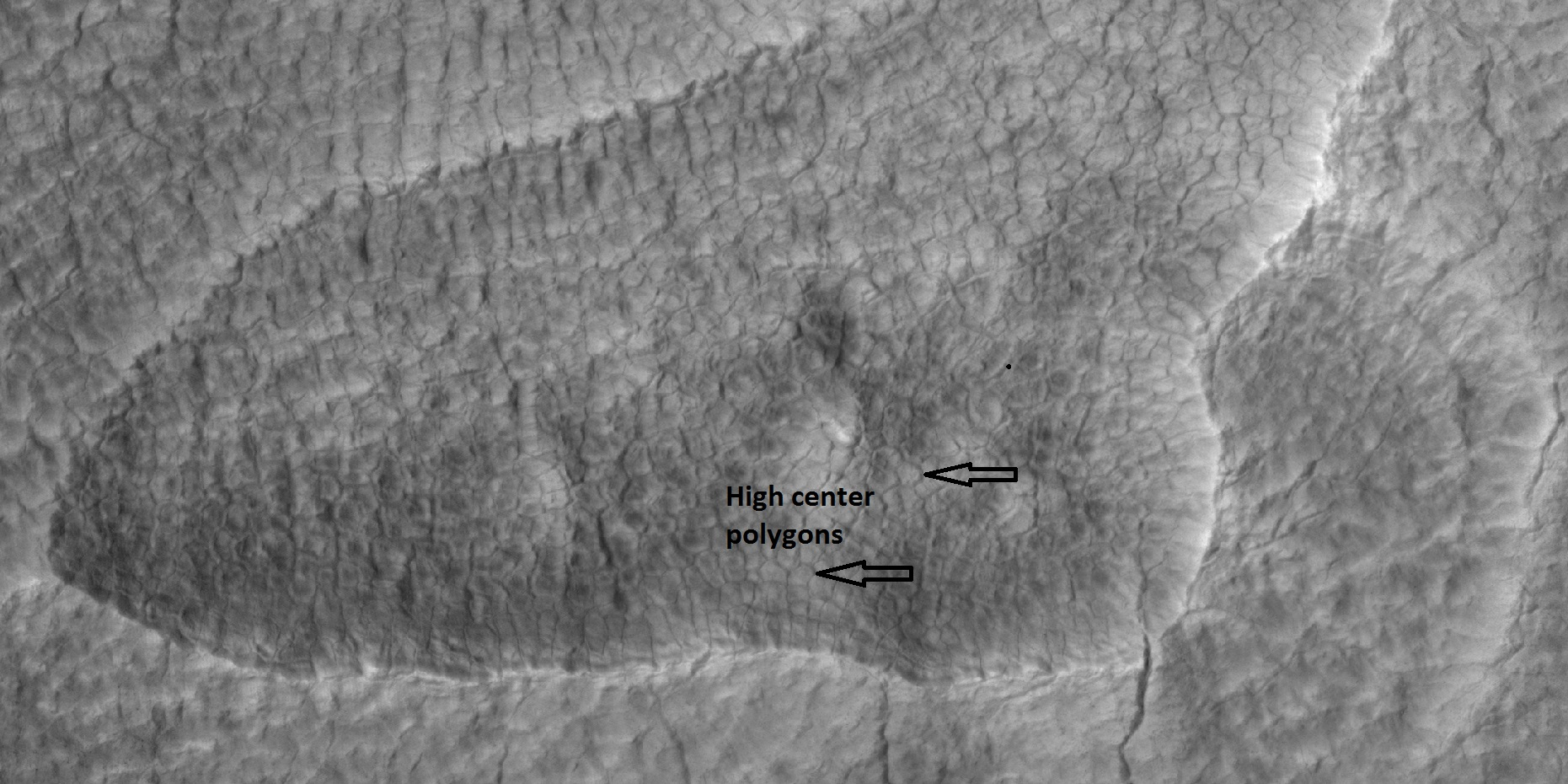
High center polygons, shown with arrows, as seen by HiRISE under HiWish program. Location is Casius quadrangle. Image enlarged with HiView.

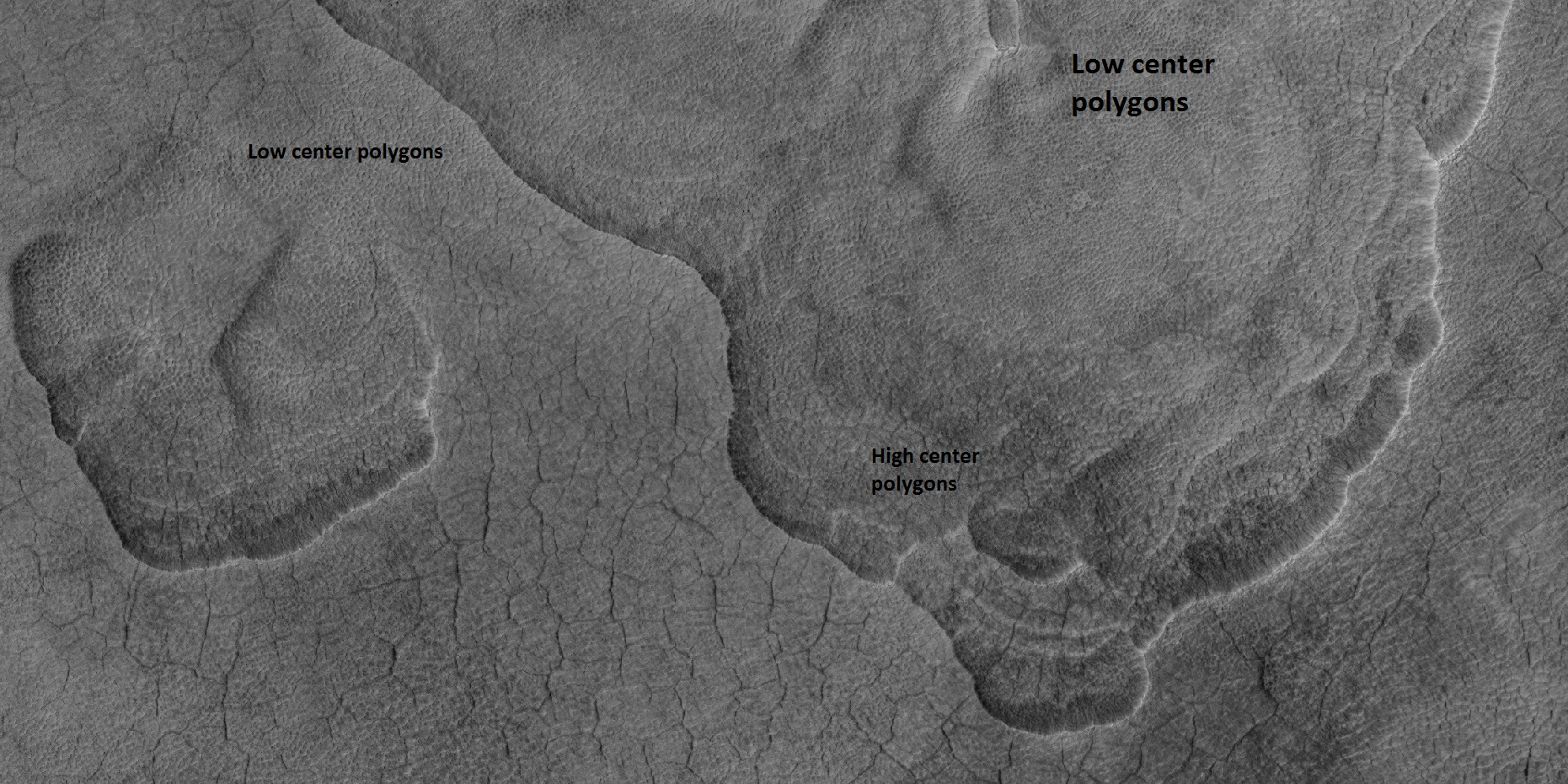
Scalloped terrain labeled with both low center polygons and high center polygons, as seen by HiRISE under HiWish program Location is Casius quadrangle. Image enlarged with HiView.

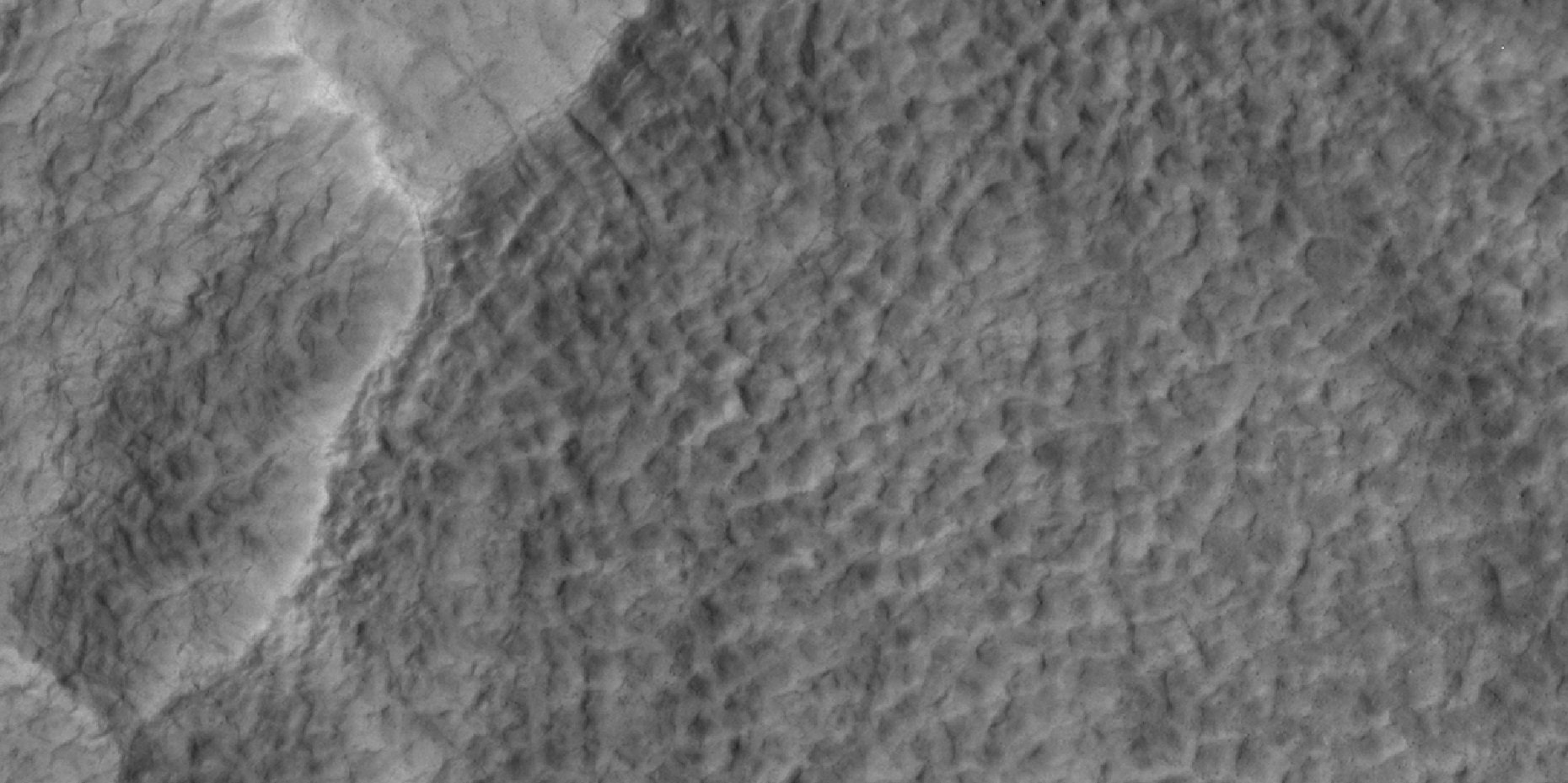
Low center polygons, as seen by HiRISE under HiWish program Location is Casius quadrangle. Image enlarged with HiView.

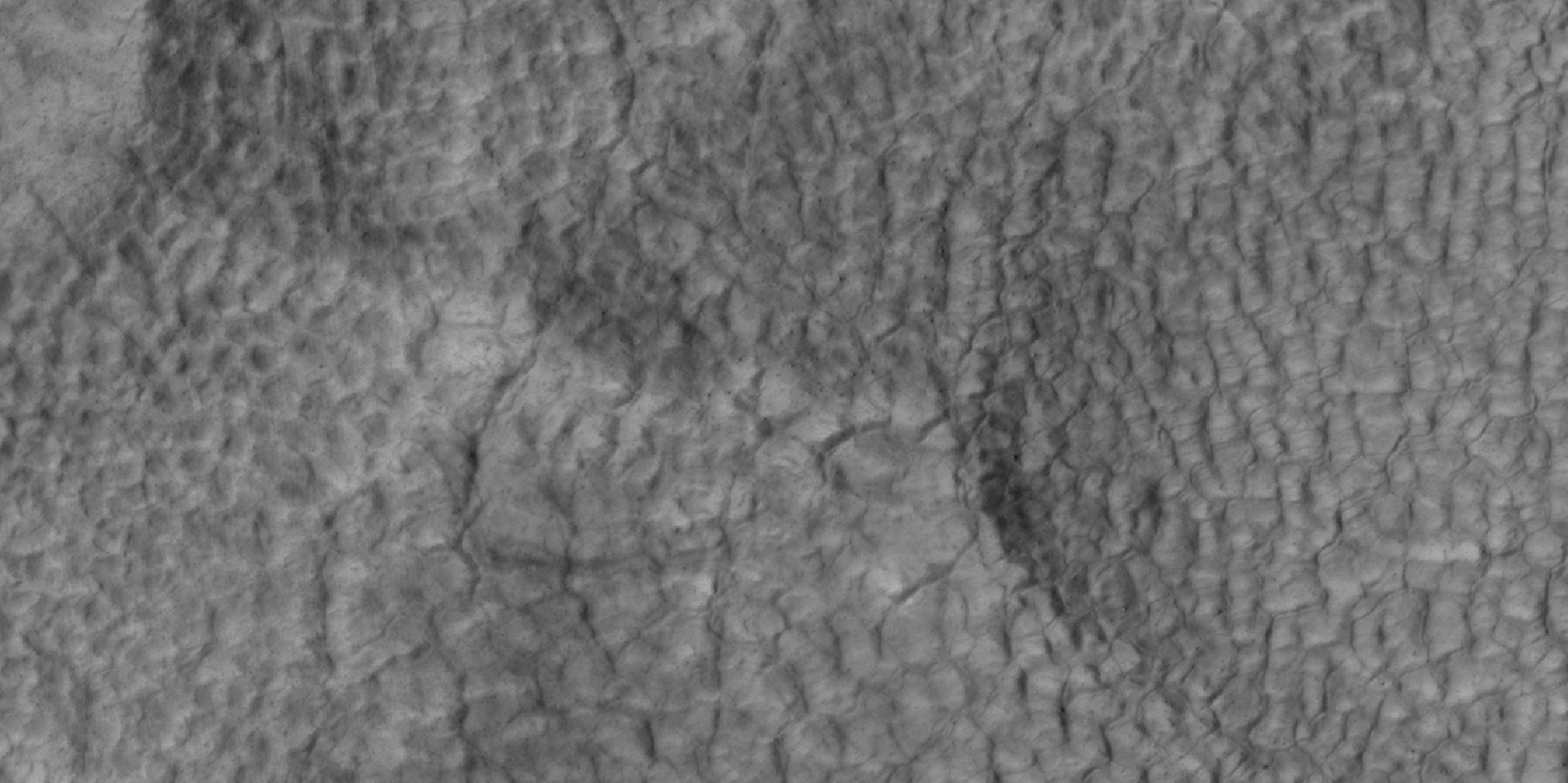
High and low center polygons, as seen by HiRISE under HiWish program Location is Casius quadrangle. Image enlarged with HiView.
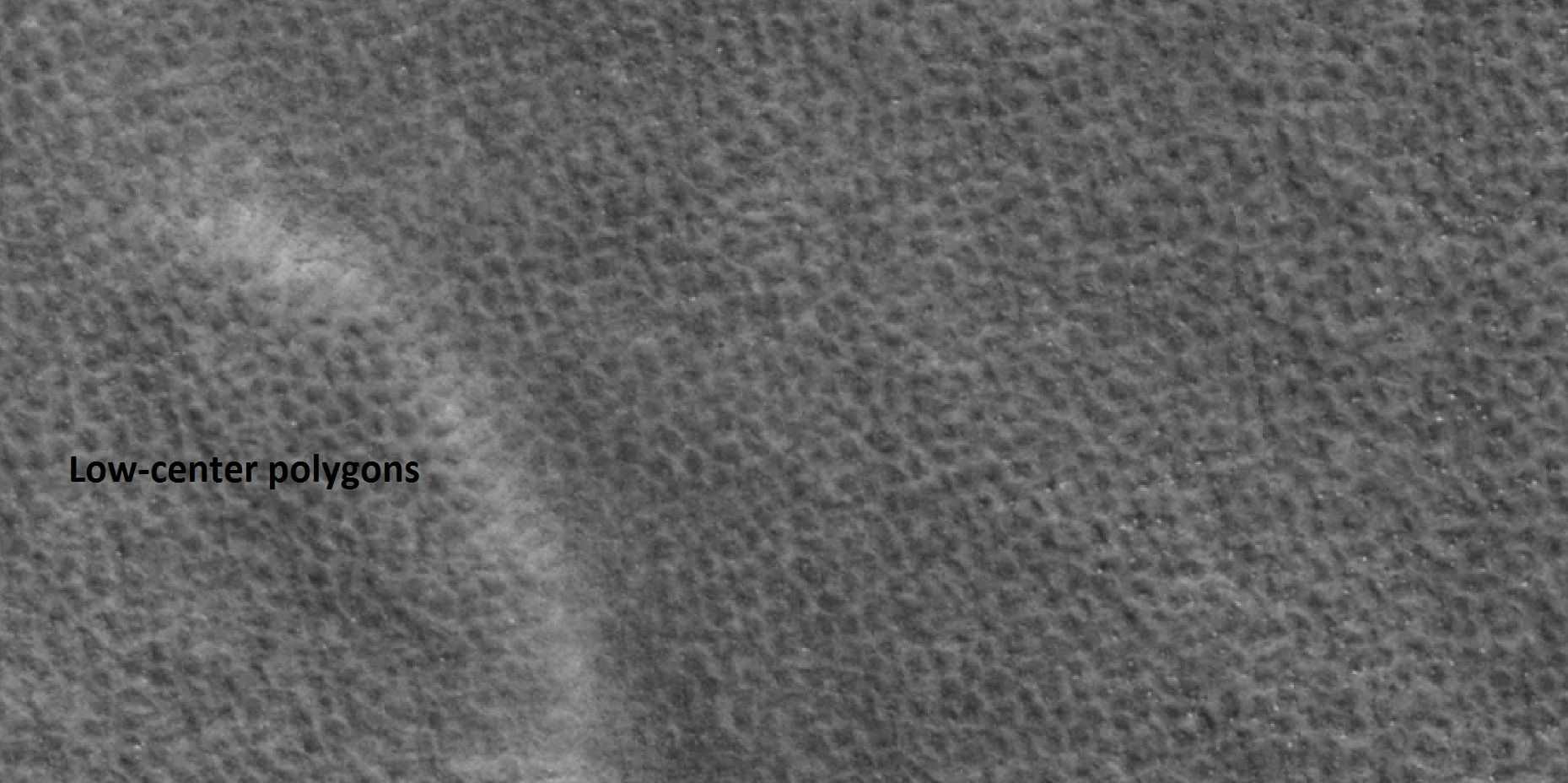
Low-centered polygons in a region of scalloped terrain, as seen by HiRISE under HiWish program

== Polygons in Hellas quadrangle ==
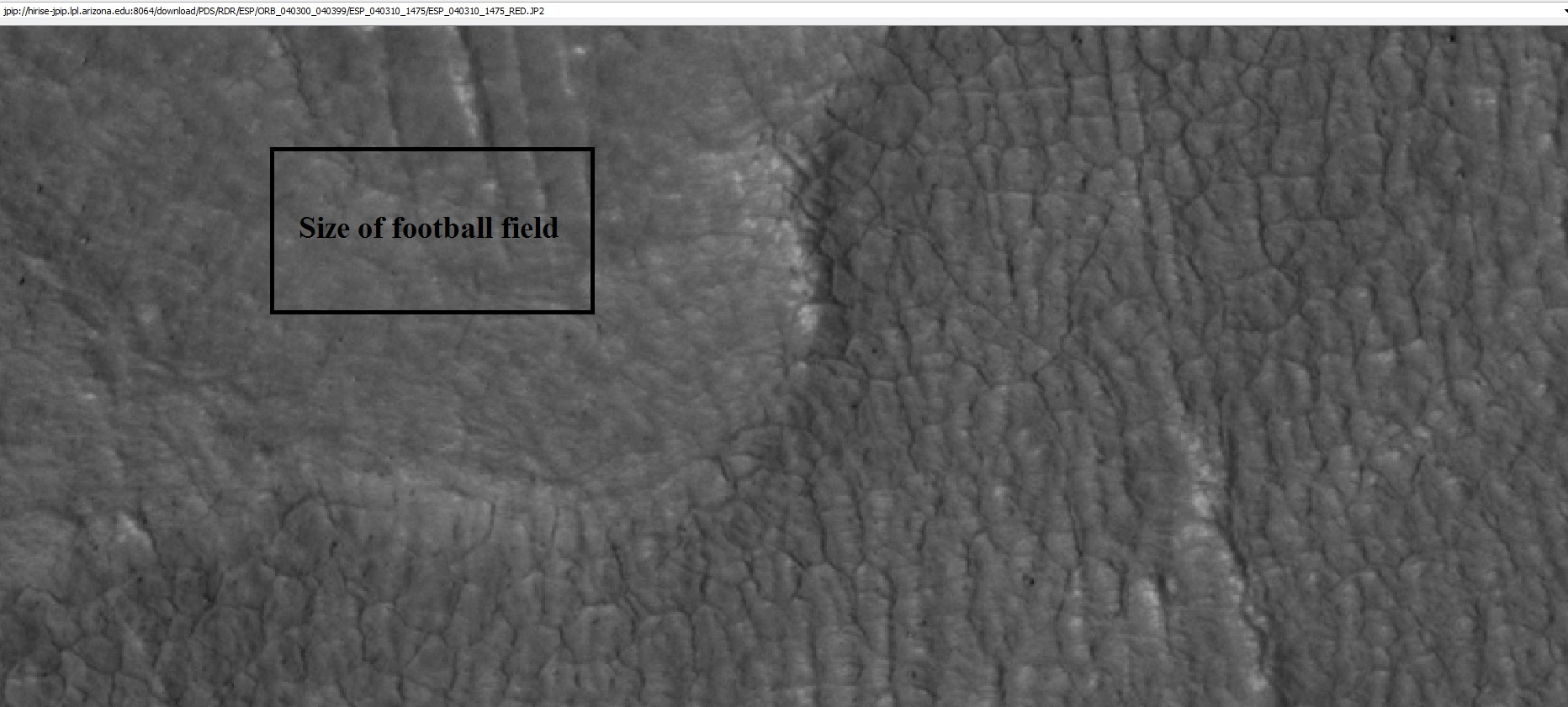
Patterned ground in Hellas, as seen by HiRISE under HiWish program The rectangle shows the size of a football field.

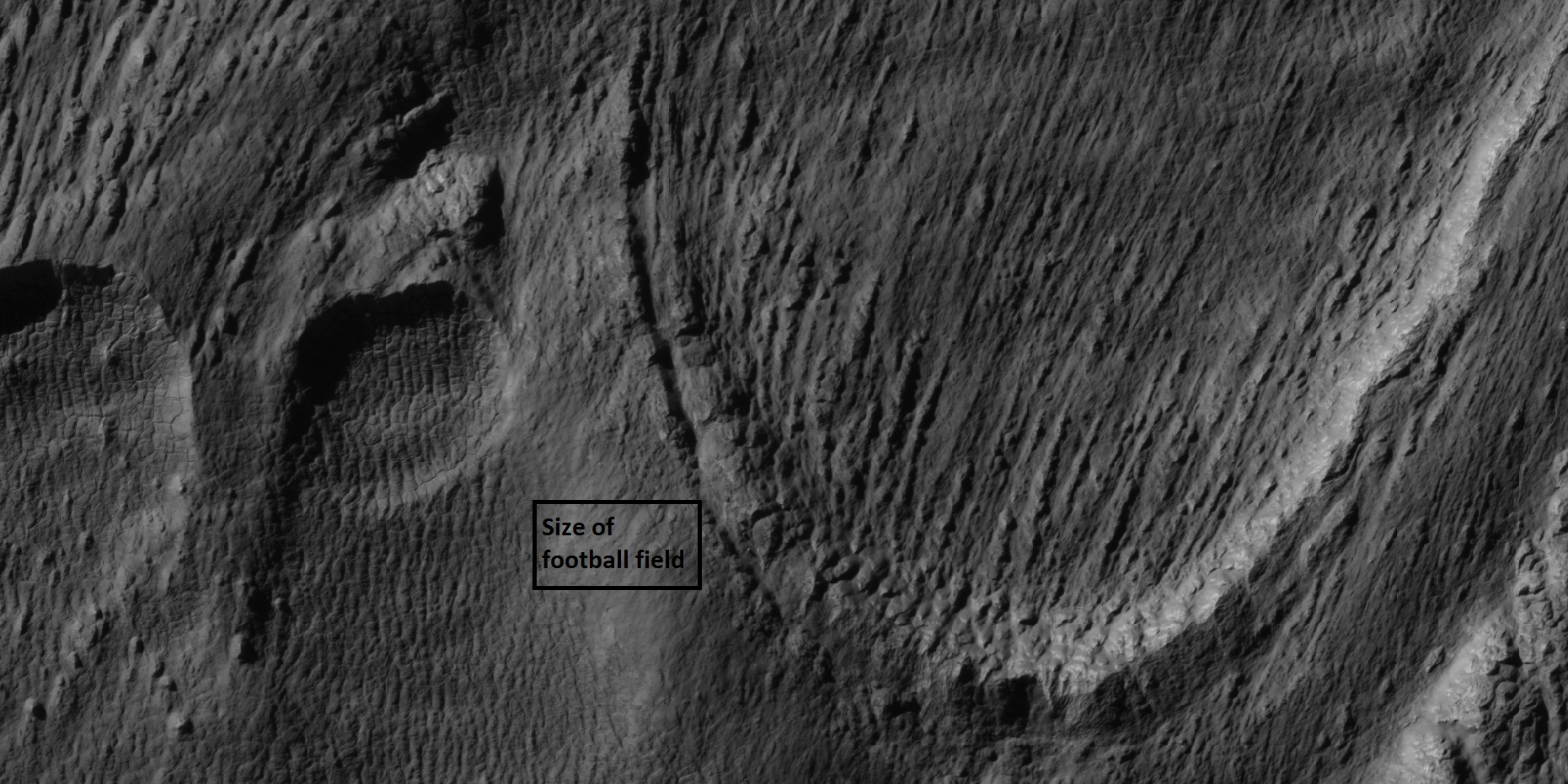
Close view of snout of glacier, as seen by HiRISE under the HiWish program High center polygons are visible. Box shows size of football field.

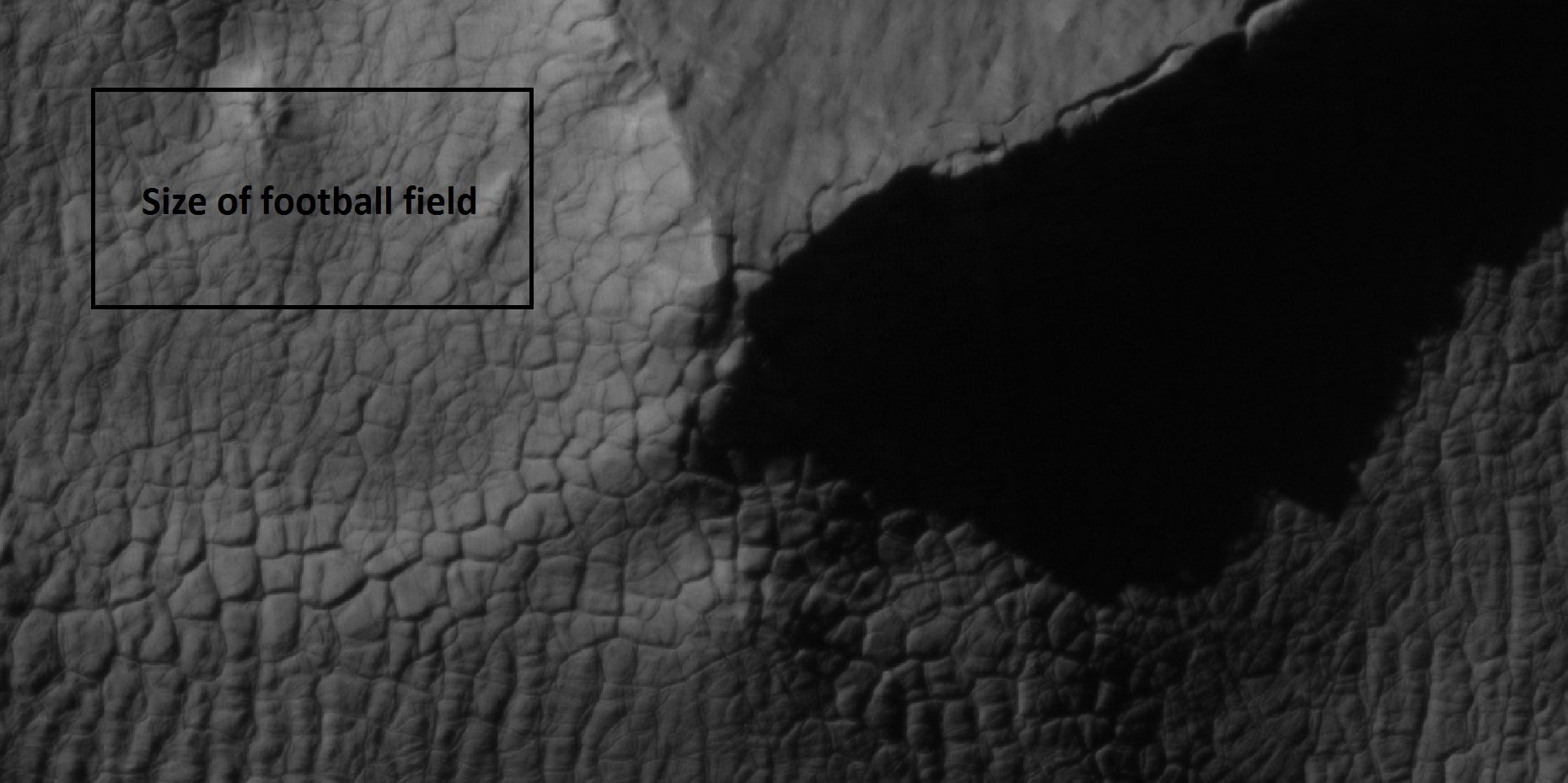
Close view of high center polygons near glacier, as seen by HiRISE under the HiWish program Box shows size of football field.

== Sizes and formation of polygonal ground ==
Fractured polygonal ground is generally divided into two kinds: high center and low center. The middle of a high center polygon is 10 meters across and its troughs are 2–3 meters wide. Low center polygons are 5–10 meters across and the boundary ridges are 3–4 meters wide.

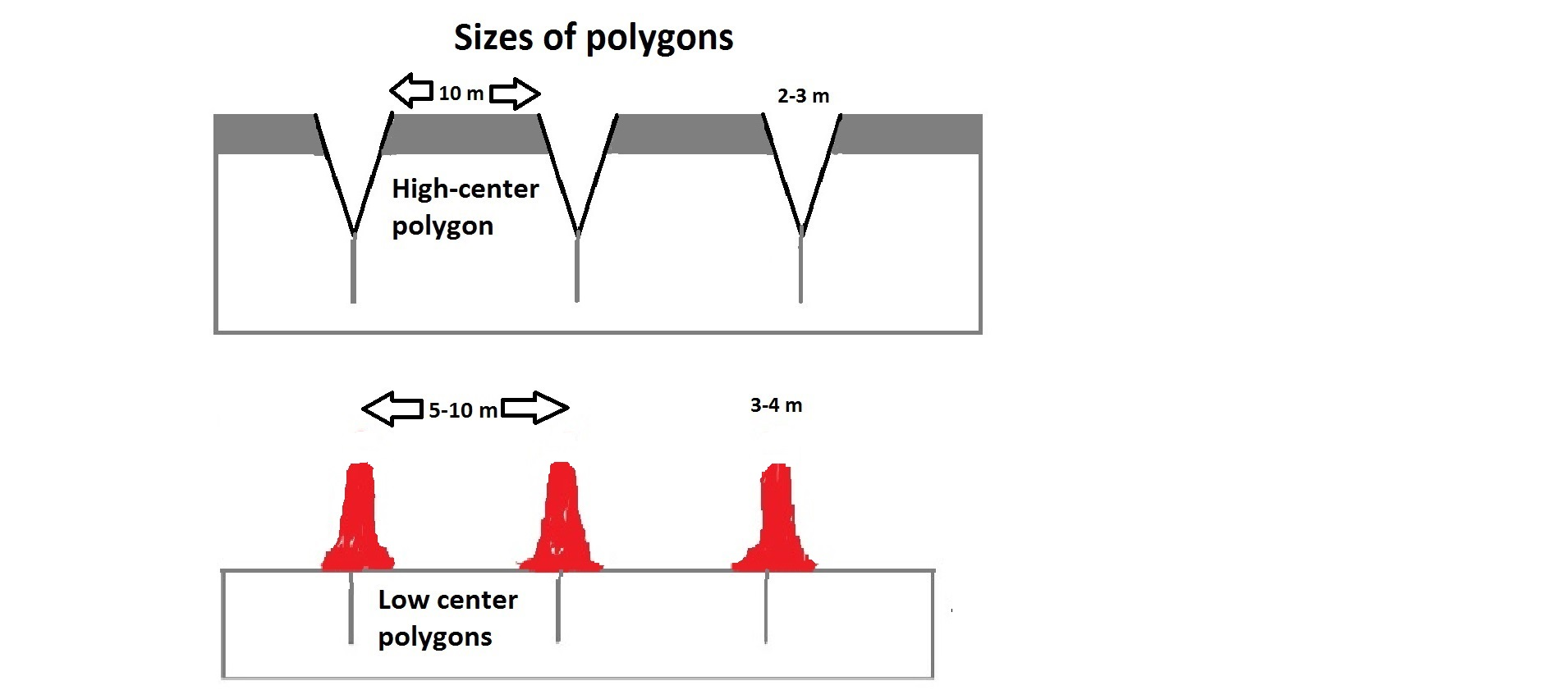
Drawing with a side view showing sizes of high and low center polygons

High center polygons are higher in the center and lower along their boundaries. It forms from increased sublimation around cracks in a surface. Cracks are common in ice-rich surfaces.

The cracks provide a place of increased surface area for sublimation. After a time the narrow cracks widen to become troughs.

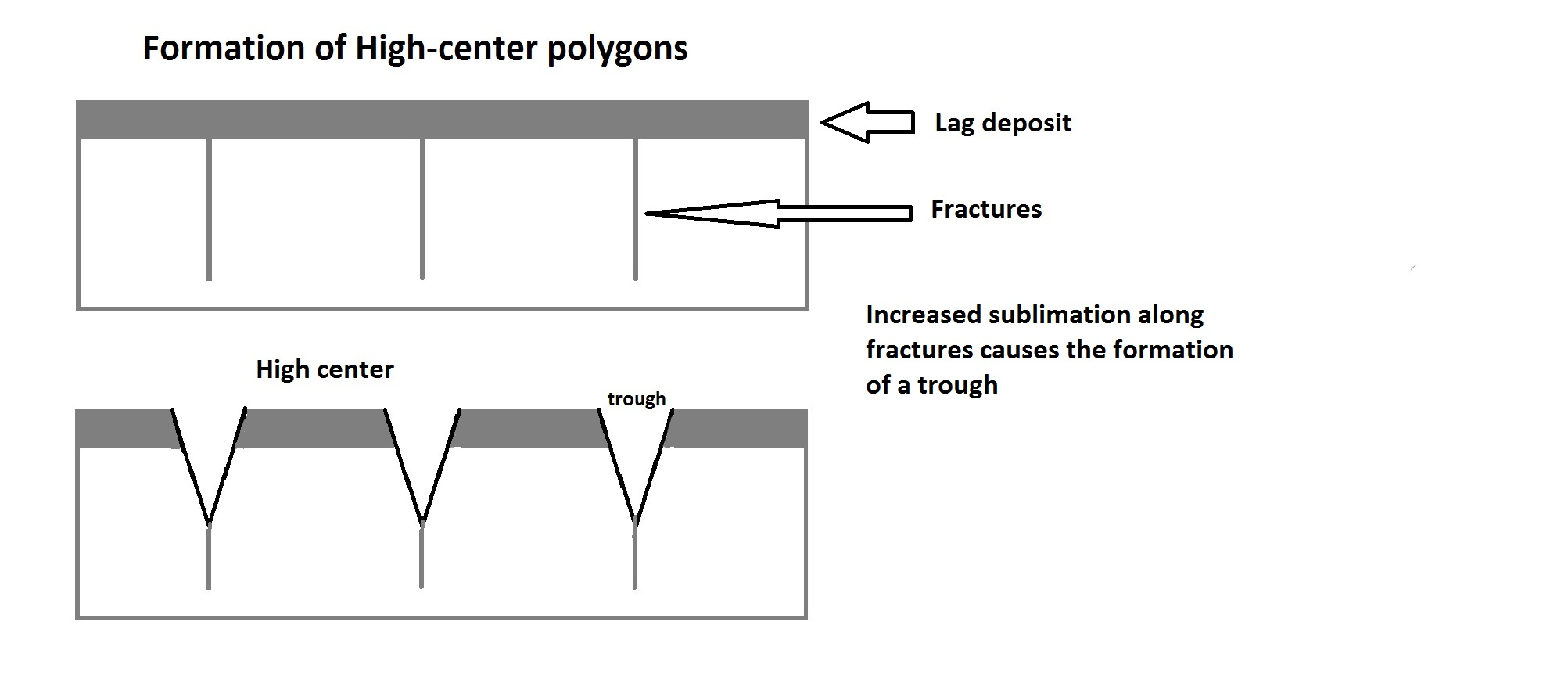
Drawing showing formation of high center polygons. Ice-rich mantle develops a lag deposit. Stresses create cracks. Increased sublimation along cracks causes troughs.

Low center polygons are thought to develop from the high center polygons. The troughs along the edges of high center polygons may become filled with sediment. This thick sediment will retard sublimation, so more sublimation will take place in the center that is protected by a thinner lag deposit. In time, the middle becomes lower than the outer parts. The sediments from the troughs will turn into ridges.

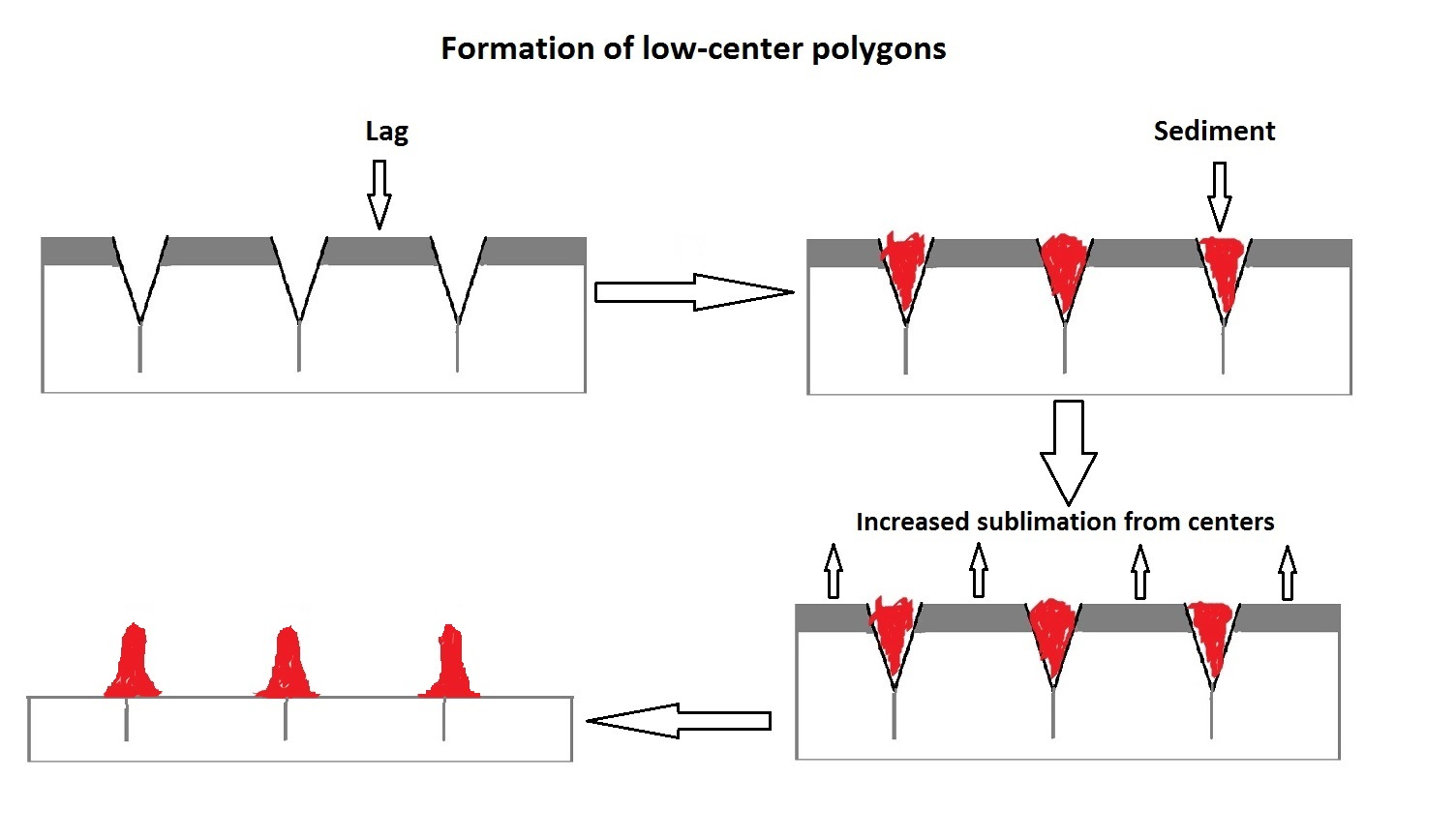
Diagram showing how low center polygons develop. The troughs of high center polygons fill with sediment; consequently there is much less sublimation there and more at the center.

== High-center polygons in Noachis quadrangle ==
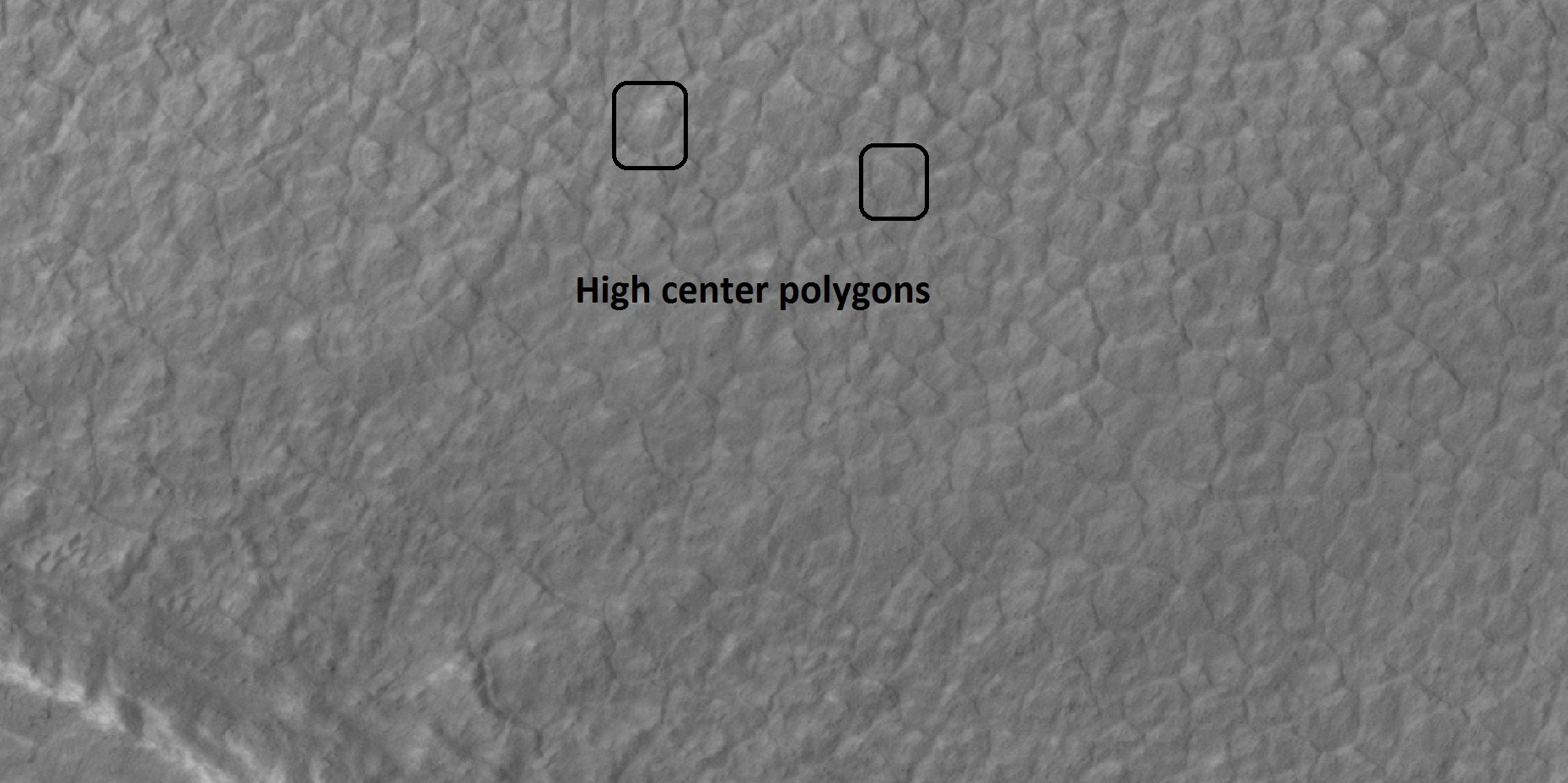
High center polygons, as seen by HiRISE under HiWish program Boxes surround two individual polygons.

== High-center polygons in Ismenius Lacus quadrangle ==
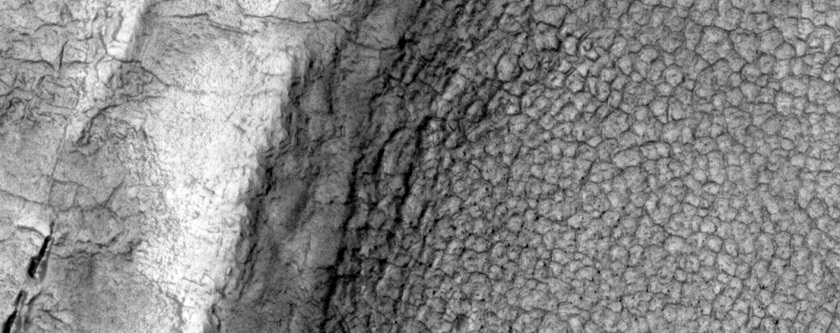
High-center polygons, as seen by HiRISE under HiWish program Image is of the top of a debris apron in Deuteronilus Mensae.

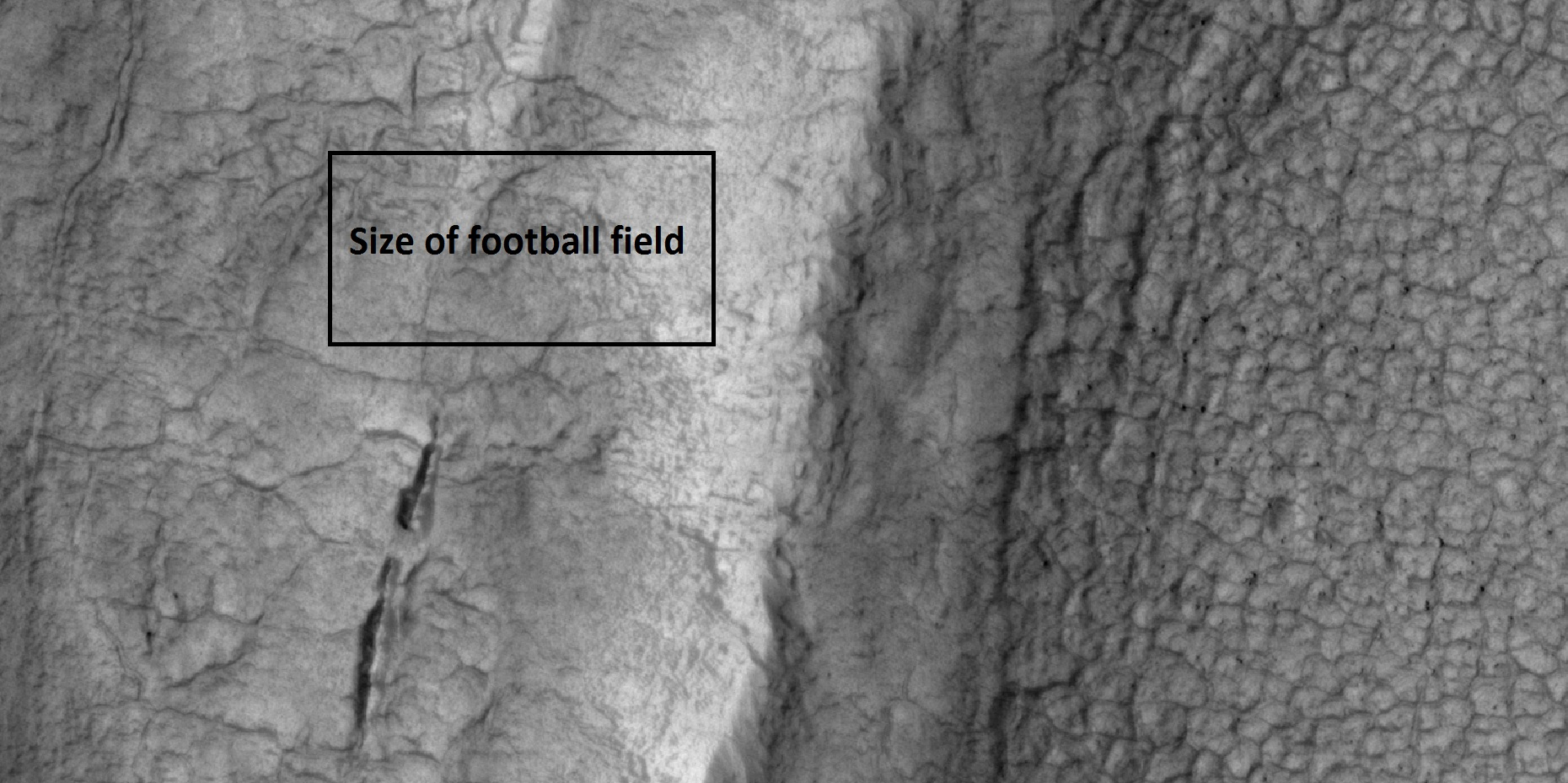
Close up of field of high center polygons with scale, as seen by HiRISE under HiWish program Note: the black box is the size of a football field.

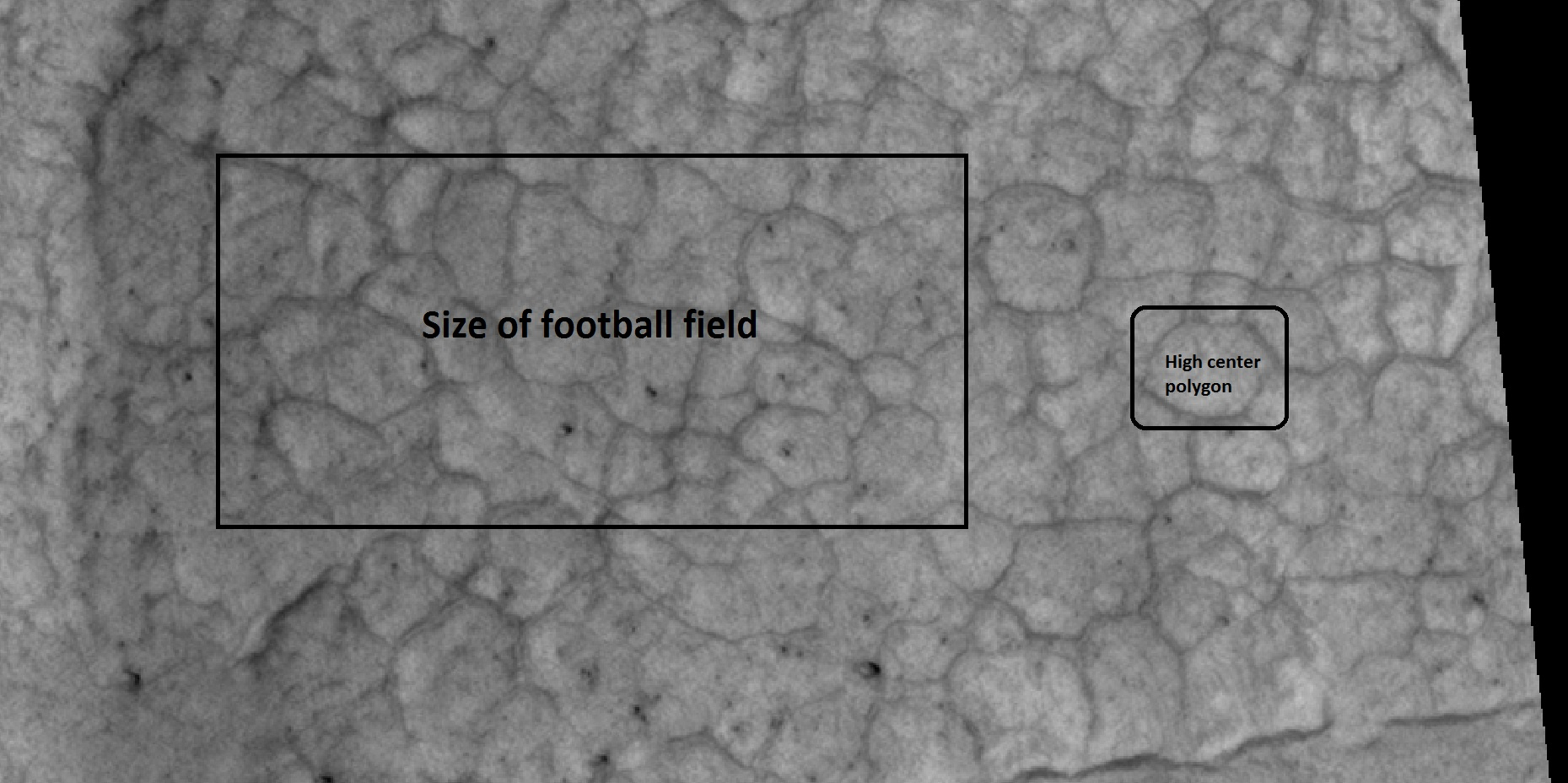
Close-up of high center polygons seen by HiRISE under HiWish program Note: the black box is the size of a football field.

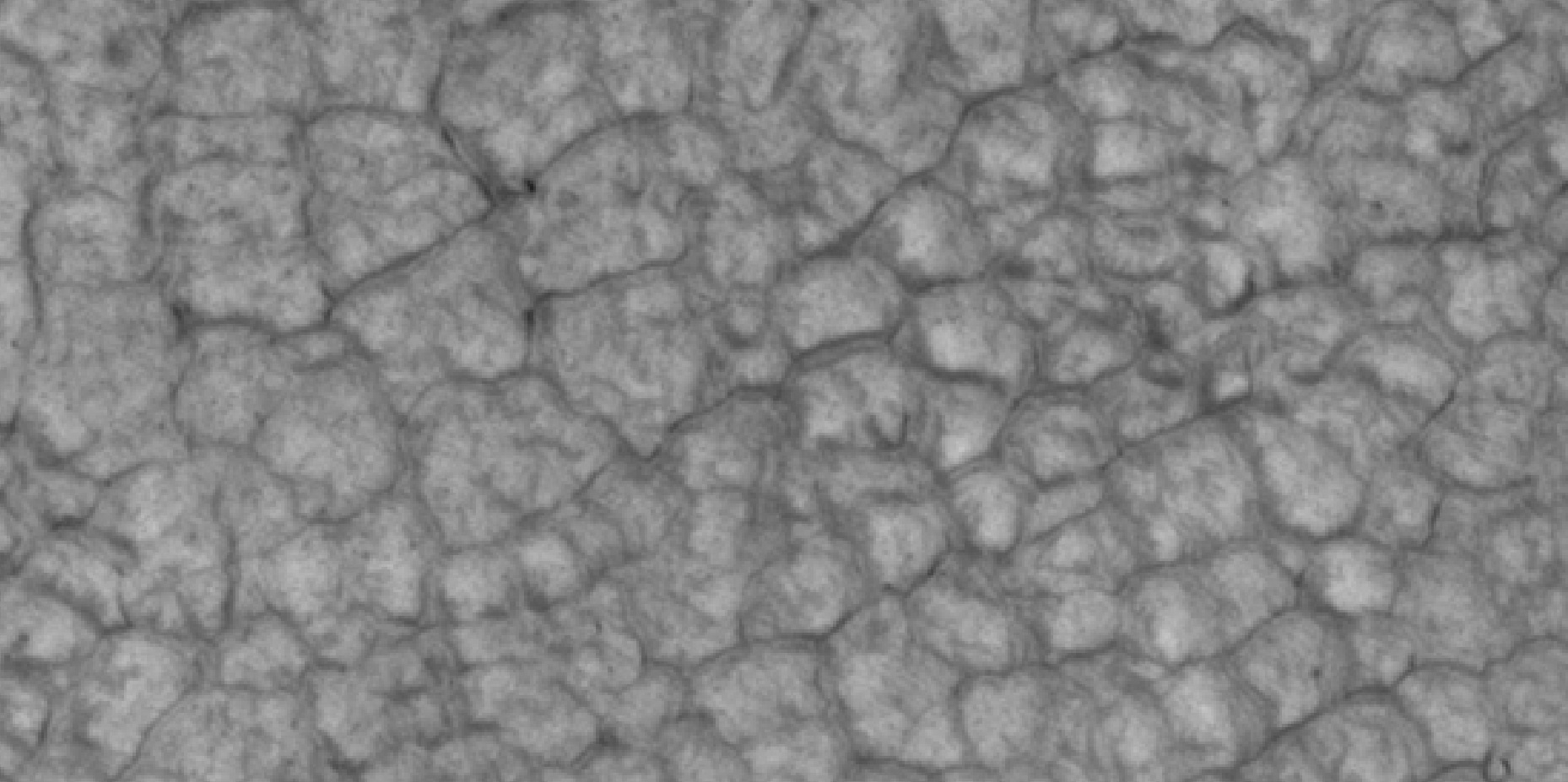
Close-up of high center polygons seen by HiRISE under HiWish program Troughs between polygons are easily visible in this view.
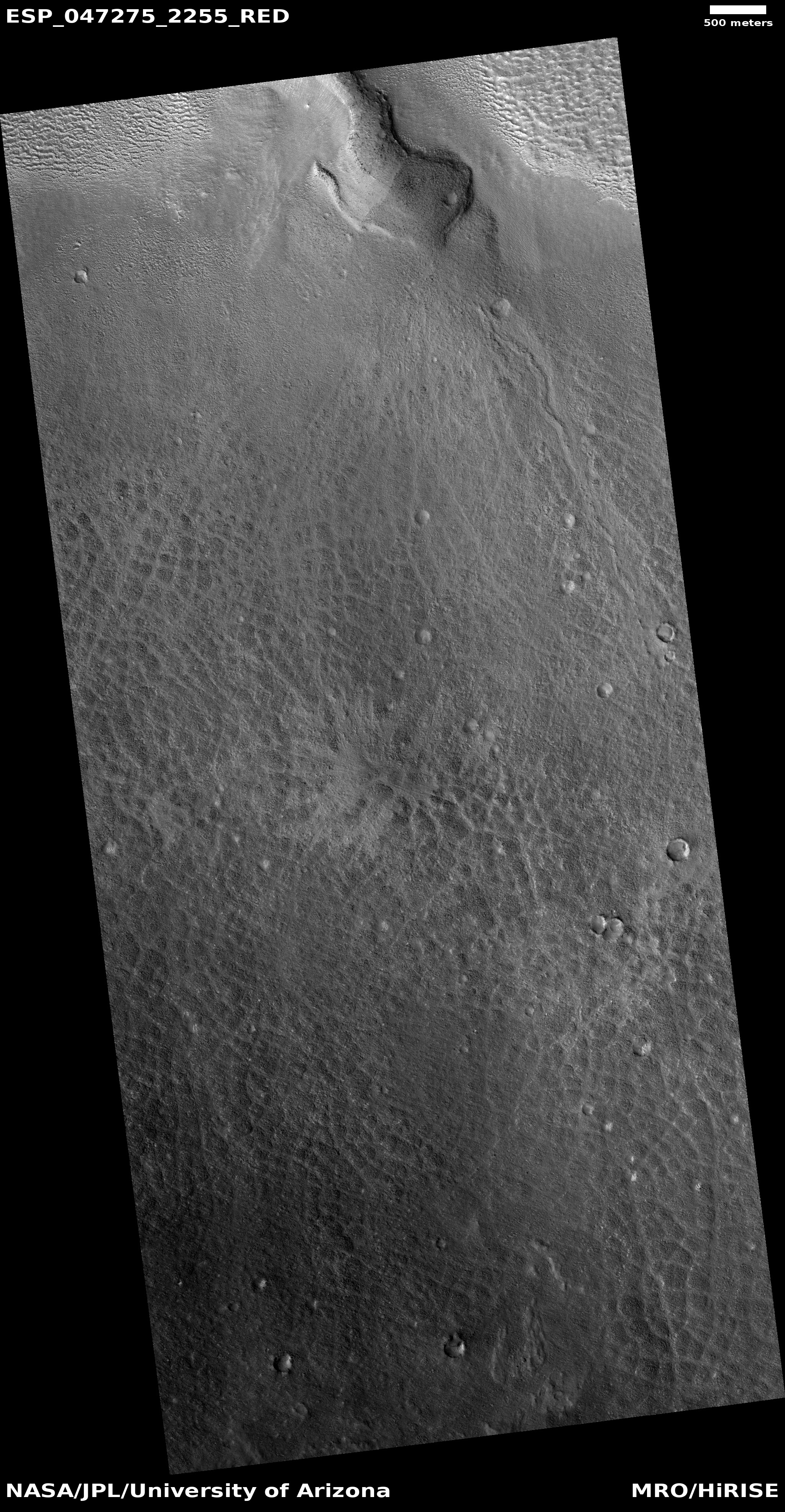
Wide view of high center polygons, as seen by HiRISE under HiWish program

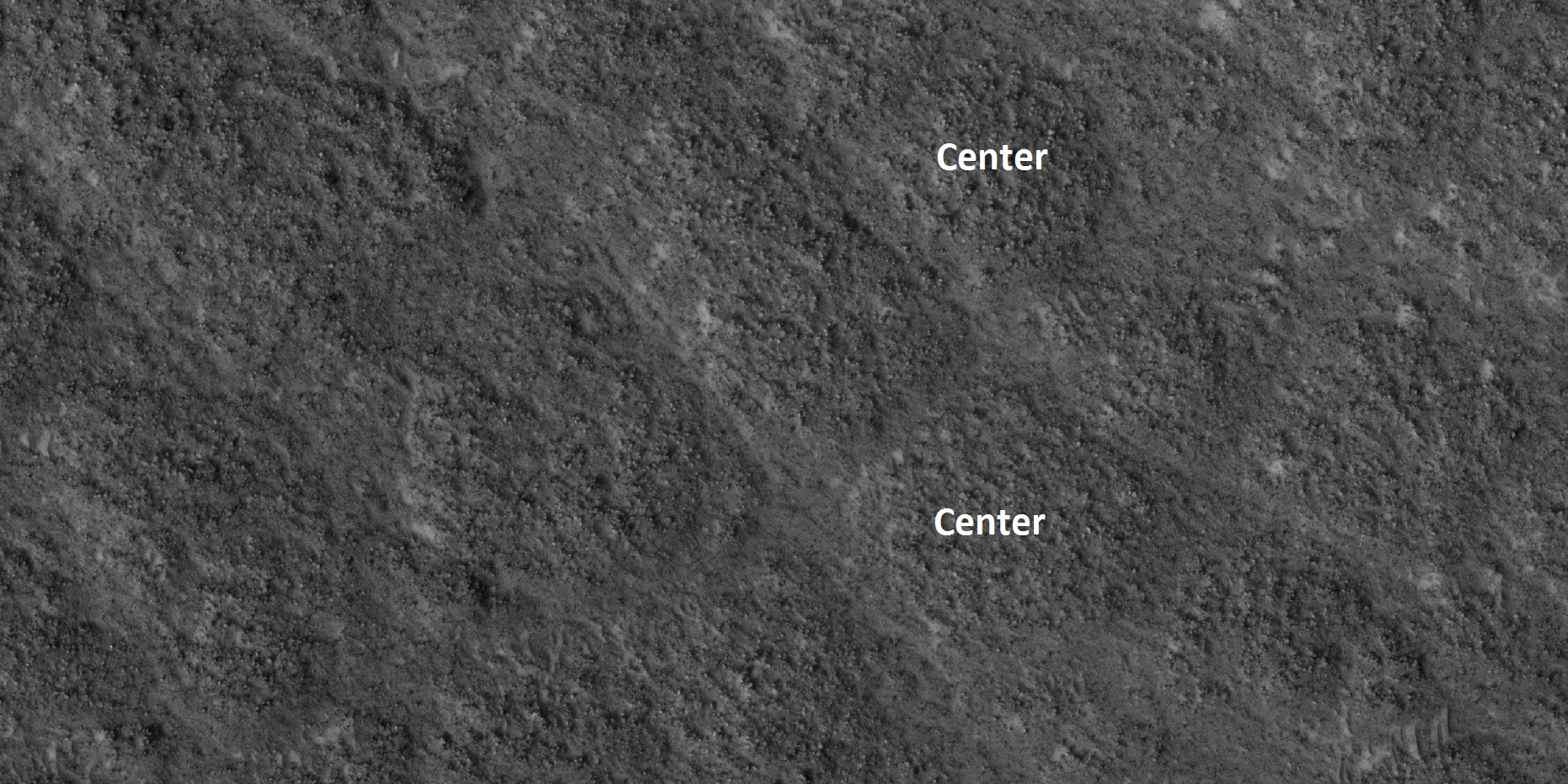
Close view of high center polygons, as seen by HiRISE under HiWish program Centers of polygons are labeled.

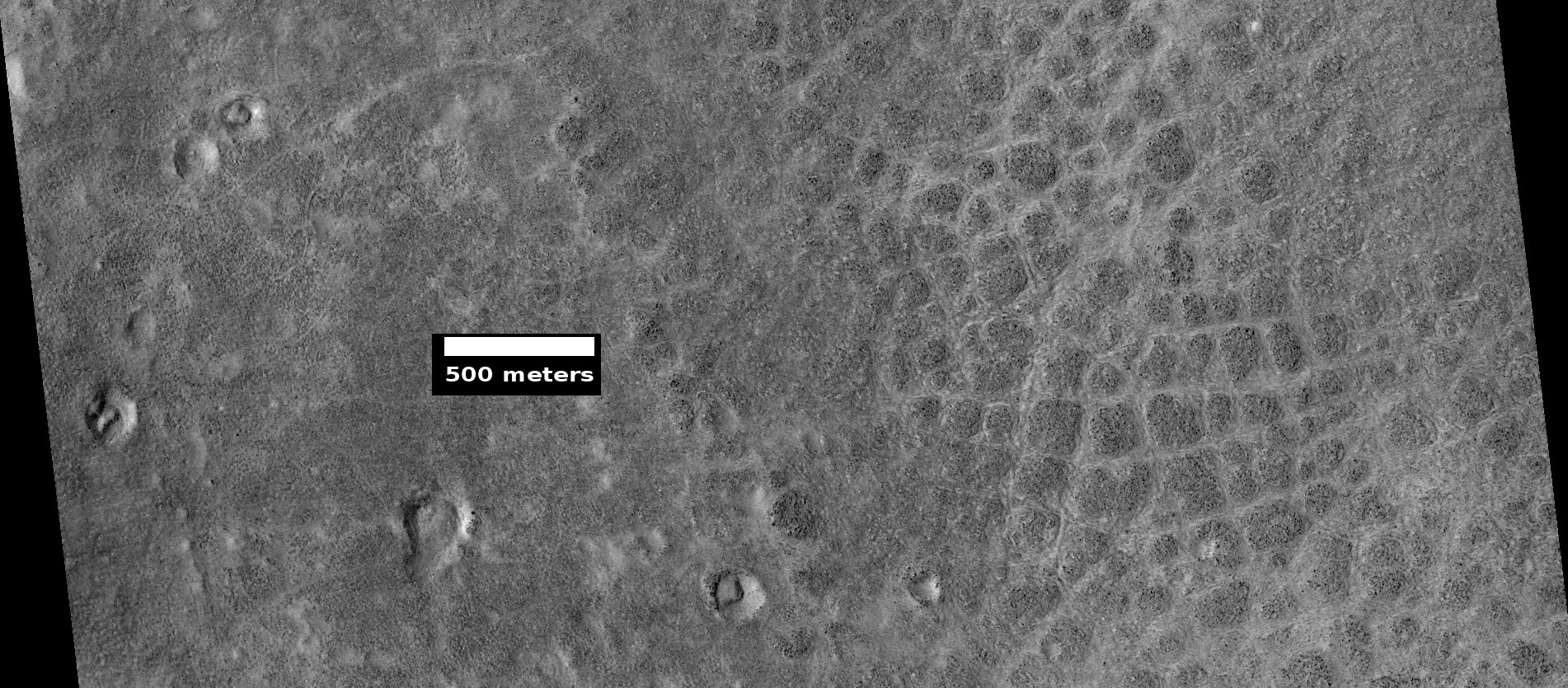
Large polygons, as seen by HiRISE under HiWish program

== Clastic patterned ground ==
Many areas of patterned ground were formed by boulders. For, as yet unknown reasons, boulders are often arranged in various shapes that include polygons. A study around Lomonosov Crater found that they were not caused by fracture networks. Clastic patterned ground has been found across the Northern Plains. Another site was Elysium Planitia. Researchers also found this terrain in the Argyre Basin (Argyre quadrangle).

== Latitude dependent mantle ==
Much of the Martian surface is covered with a thick ice-rich, mantle layer that has fallen from the sky a number of times in the past. It fell as snow and ice-coated dust. This mantle layer is called "latitude dependent mantle" because its occurrence is related to the latitude. It is this mantle that cracks and then forms polygonal ground.

The mantle layer lasts for a very long time before all the ice is gone because a protective lag deposit forms on the top. The mantle contains ice and dust. After a certain amount of ice disappears from sublimation the dust stays on the top, forming the lag deposit.

Mantle forms when the Martian climate is different than the present climate. The tilt or obliquity of the axis of the planet changes a great deal. The Earth’s tilt changes little because our rather large moon stabilizes the Earth. Mars only has two very small moons that do not possess enough gravity to stabilize its tilt. When the tilt of Mars exceeds around 40 degrees (from today's 25 degrees), ice is deposited in certain bands where much mantle exists today.

== Other surface features ==
Another type of surface is called "brain terrain" as it looks like the surface of a human brain. Brain terrain lies under polygonal ground when the two are both visible in a region.

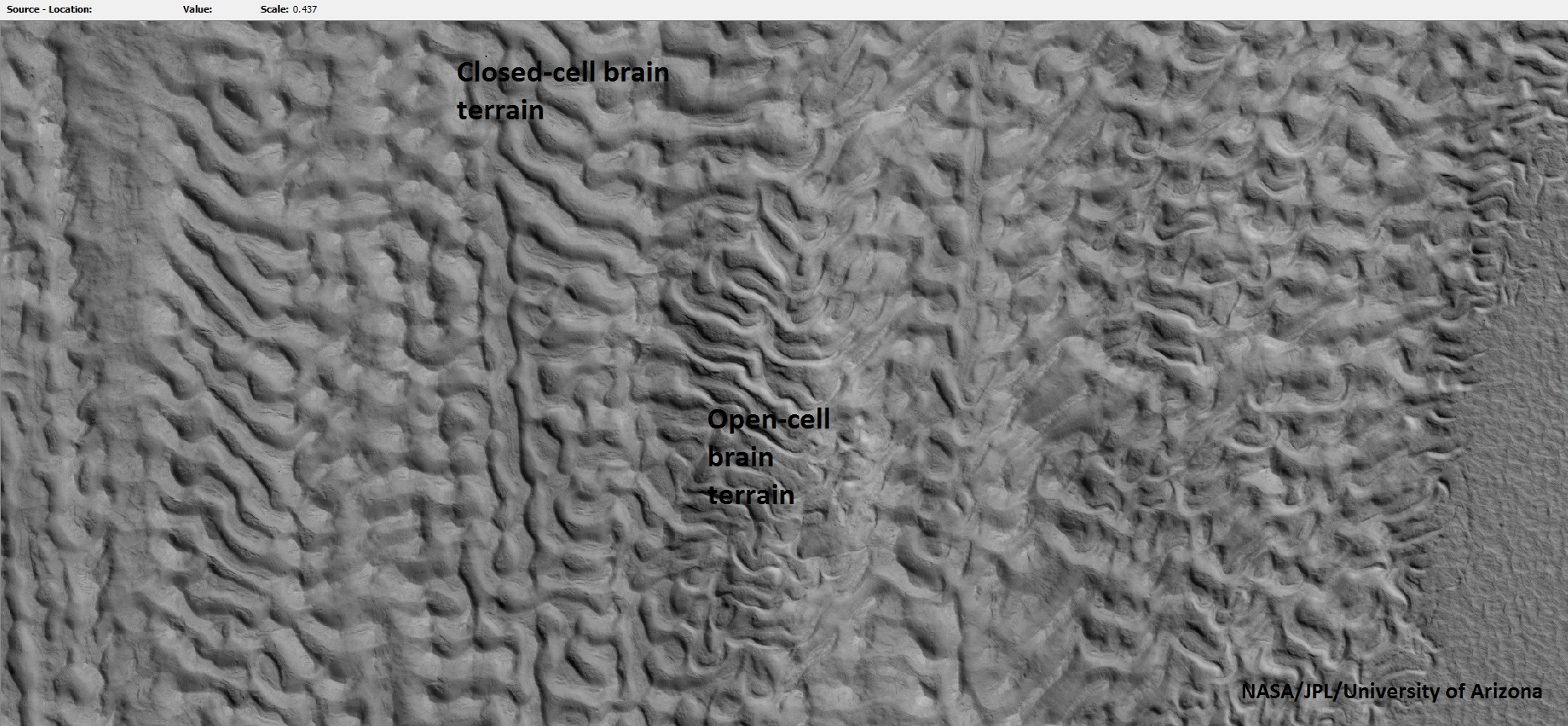
Open and closed-cell brain terrain, as seen by HiRISE, under HiWish program.

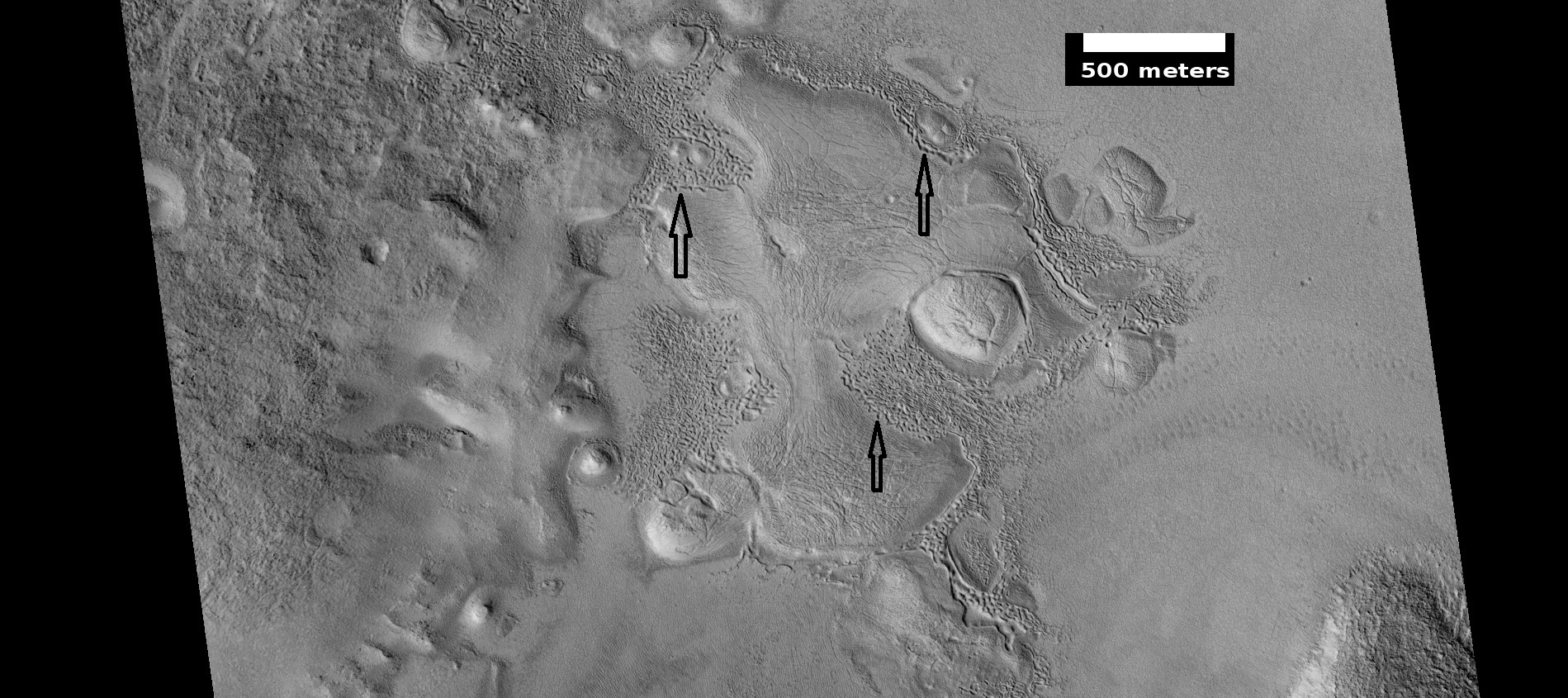
Brain terrain being formed from a thicker layer, as seen by HiRISE under HiWish program. Arrows show the thicker unit breaking up into small cells.

Since the top, polygon layer is fairly smooth although the underlying brain terrain is irregular; it is believed that the mantle layer that contains the polygons is 10–20 meters thick.

"Basketball terrain" is another expression of the surface of Mars. At certain distances it looks like a basketball’s surface. Close-up pictures have revealed it to consist of piles of rocks. Many ideas have been advanced to explain how these piles of rocks are formed.

Many steep surfaces in latitude bands near 40 degrees North and South contain gullies. Some of the gullies show polygons. These have been called "gullygons."

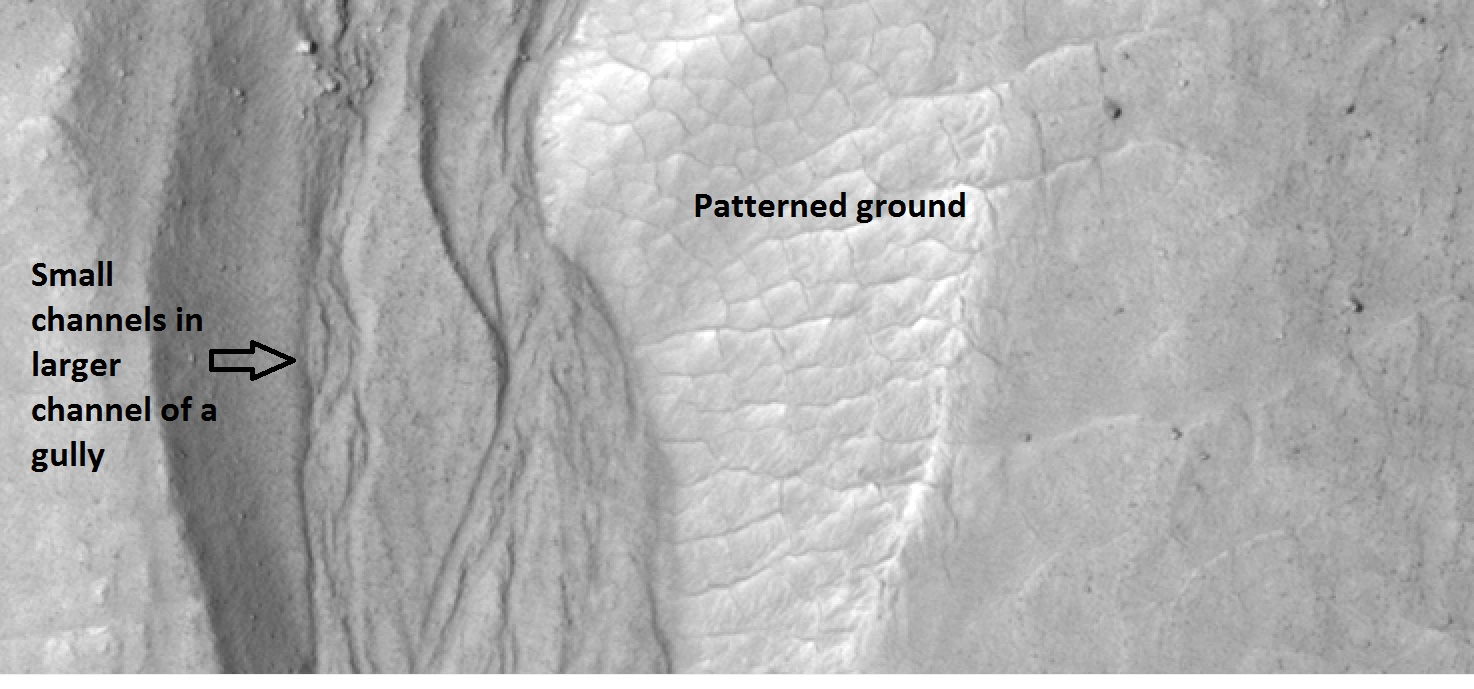
Close-up of gully showing multiple channels and patterned ground, as seen by HiRISE under the HiWish program. Locations is Phaethontis quadrangle.

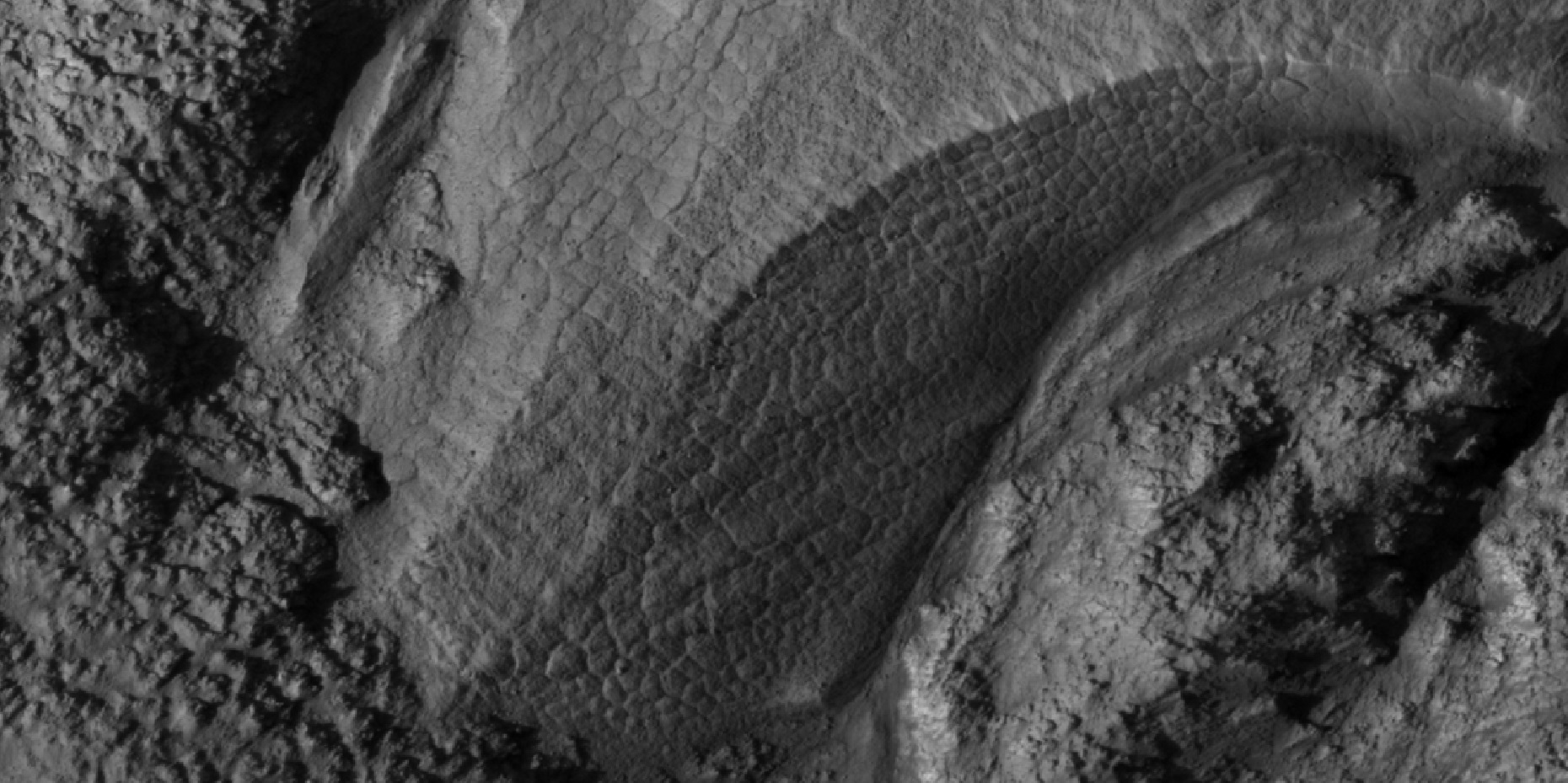
Close-up of gully alcove showing "gullygons" (polygonal patterned ground near gullies), as seen by HiRISE under HiWish program Note this is an enlargement of a previous image.

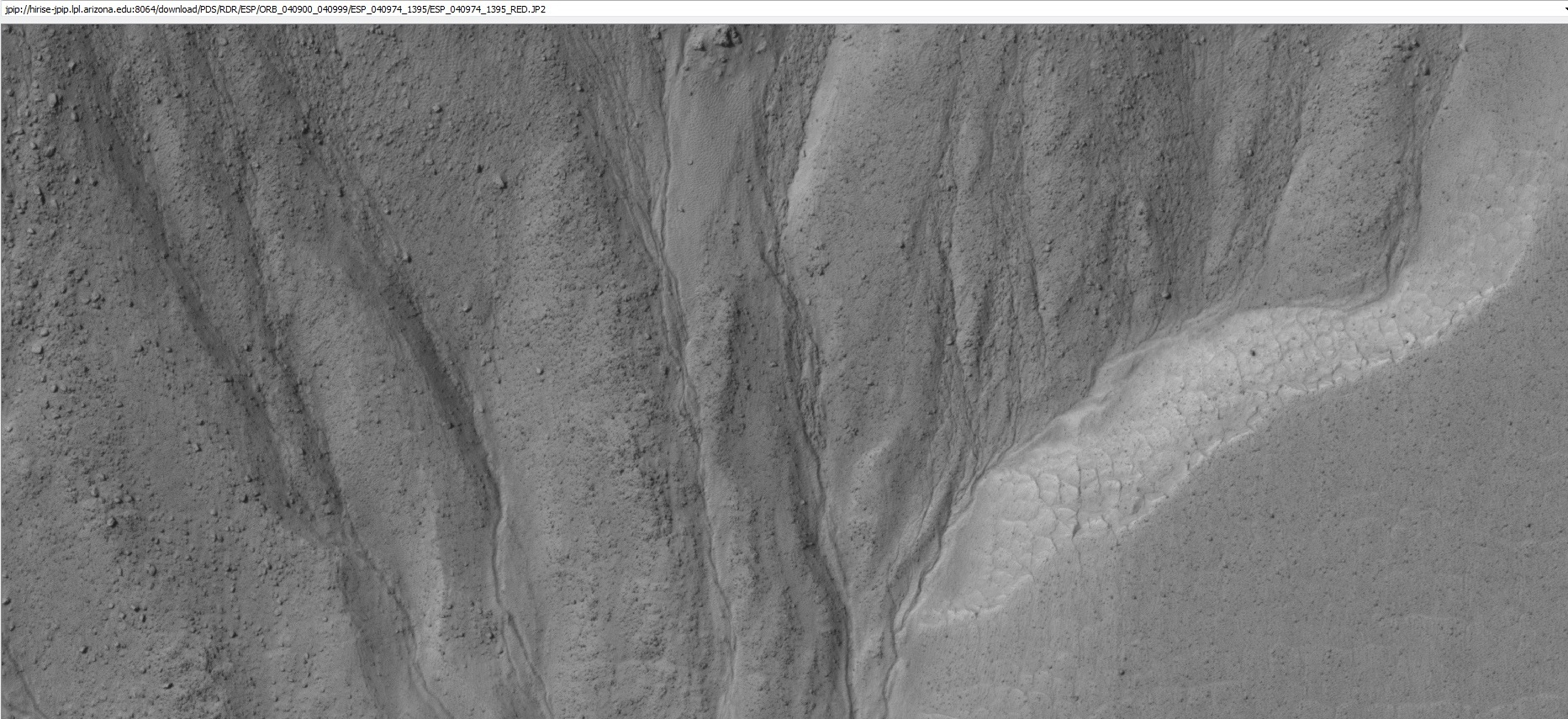
Close-up of small channels in gullies in Arkhangelsky Crater in Argyre quadrangle, as seen by HiRISE under HiWish program Patterned ground in the shape of polygons can be seen to the right.

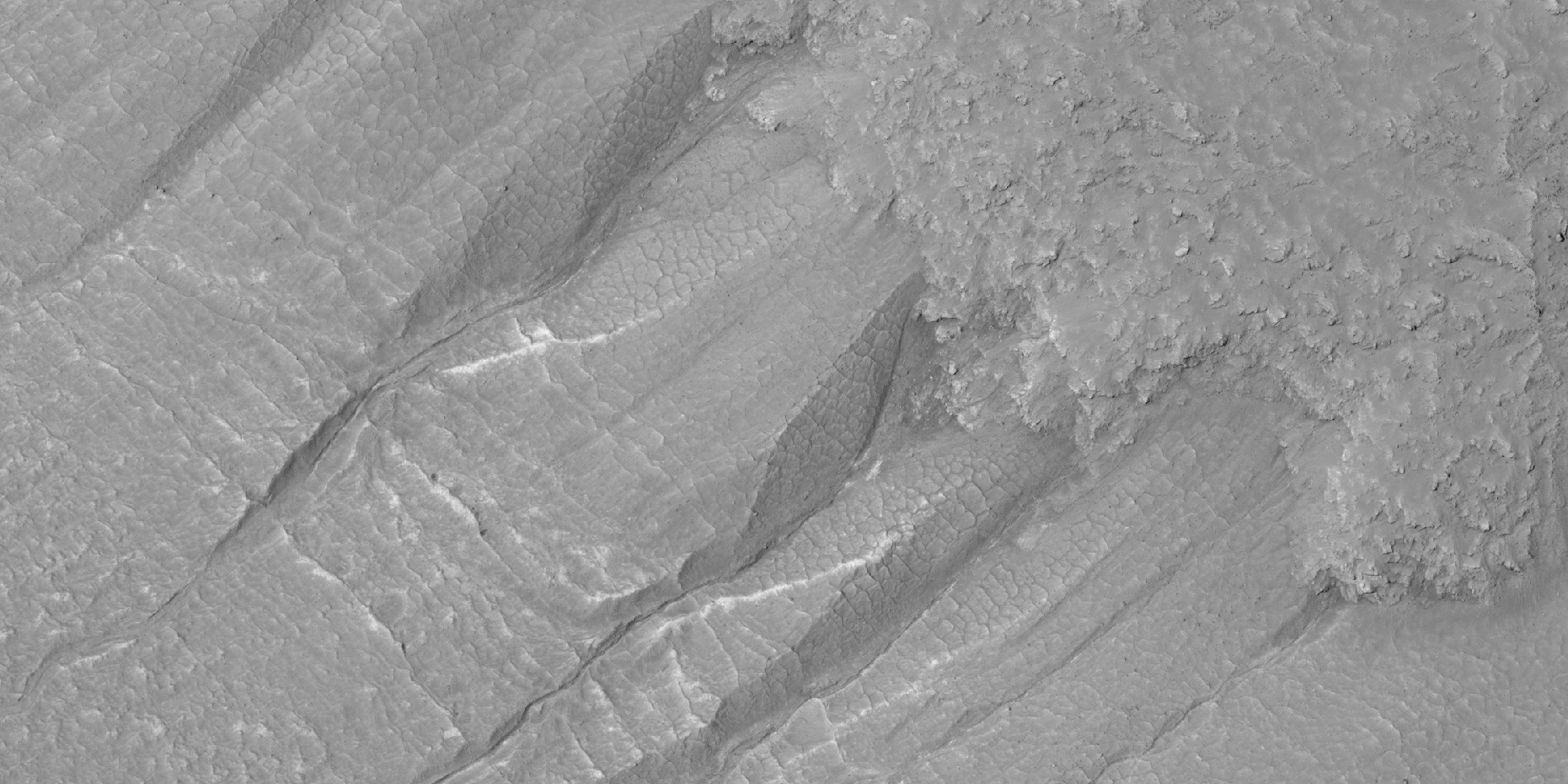
Polygons around gullies in crater, as seen by HiRISE under HiWish program Location is Hellas quadrangle.

== Complex polygonal patterned ground ==
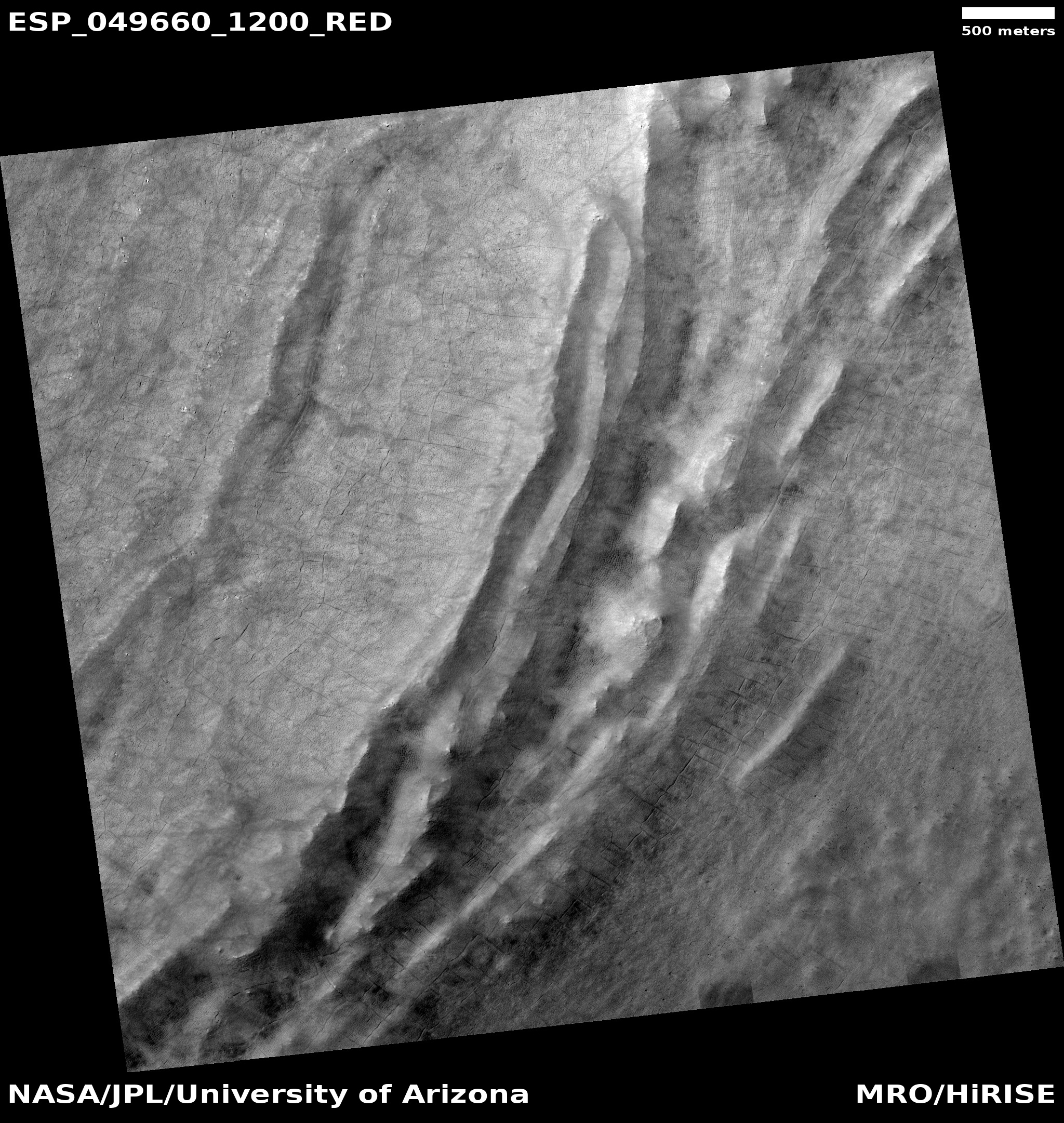
Wide view of polygons, as seen by HiRISE under HiWish program Parts of this image are enlarged in following images. The location is the Noachis quadrangle

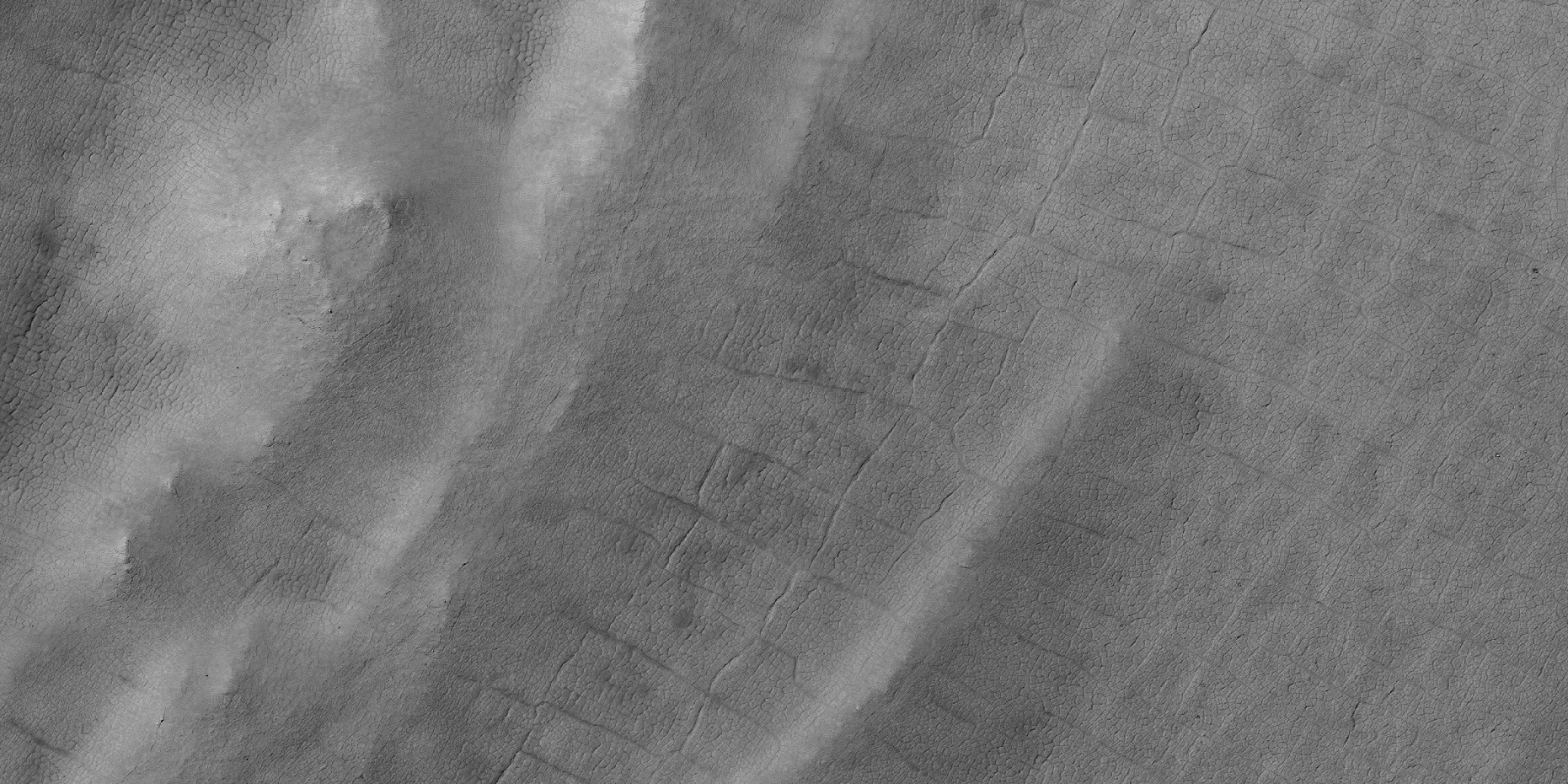
Polygons, as seen by HiRISE under HiWish program

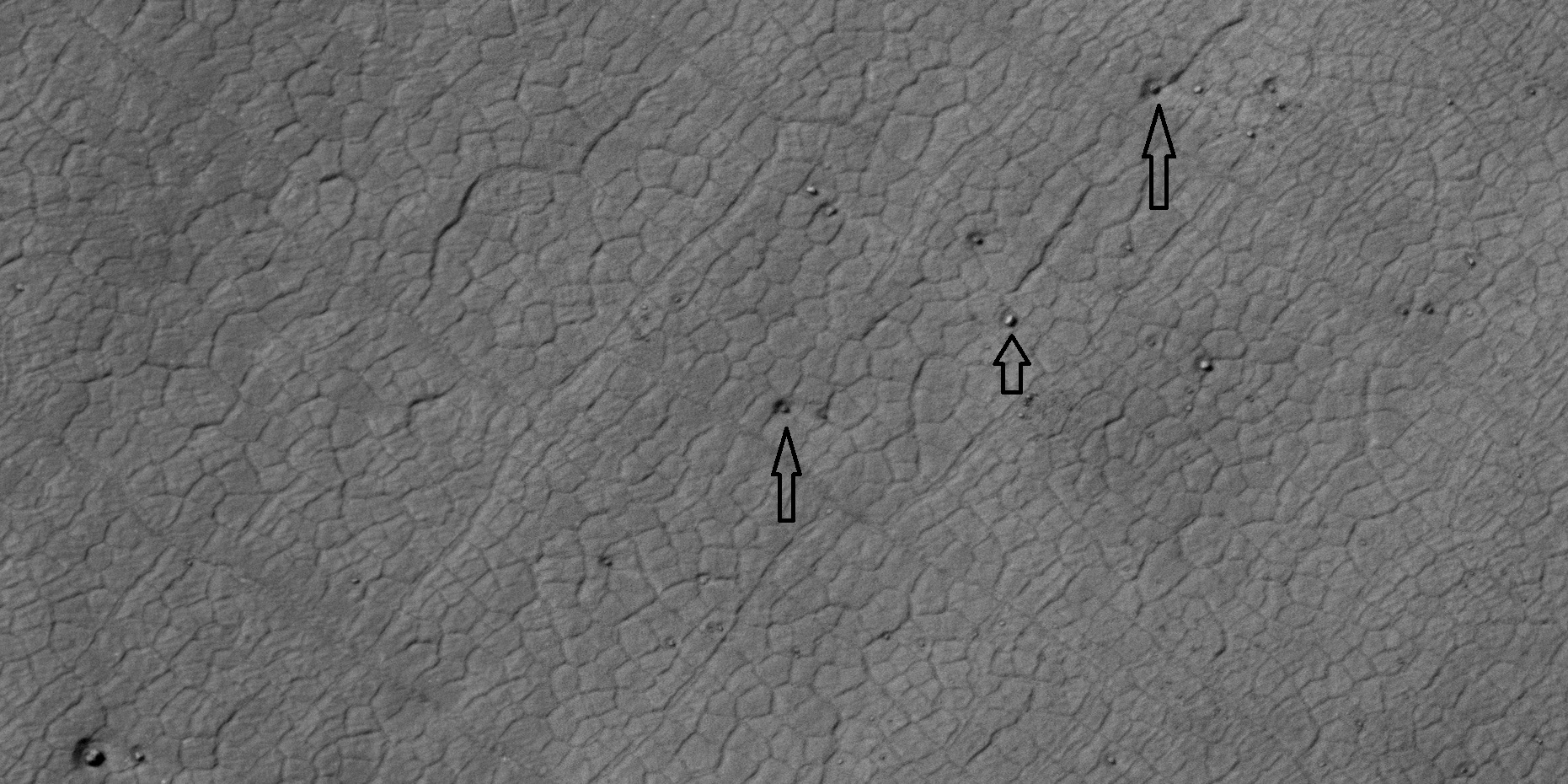
Close view of polygons, as seen by HiRISE under HiWish program Arrow point to boulders that sit inside of small craters.

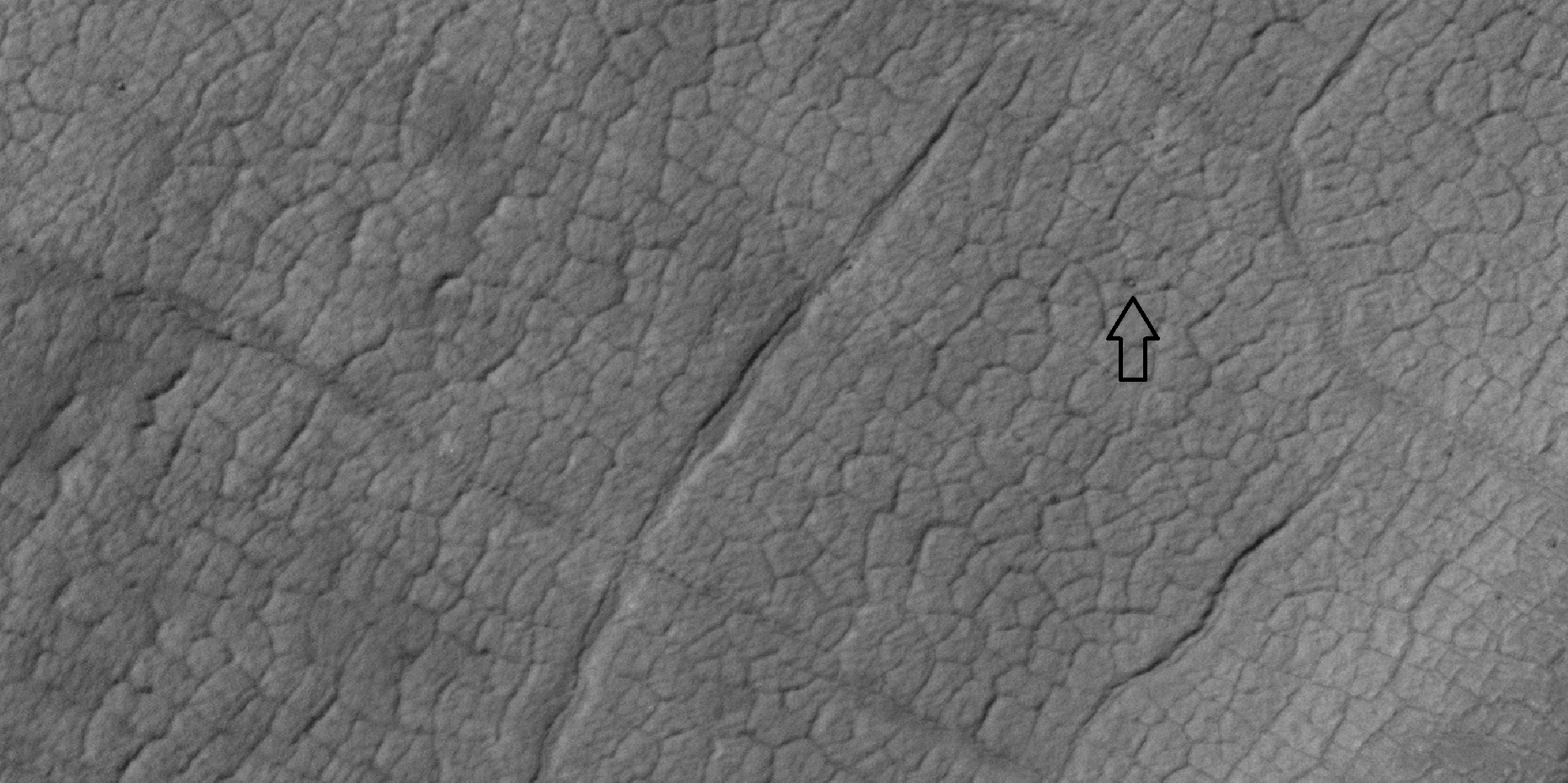
Close view of polygons, as seen by HiRISE under HiWish program

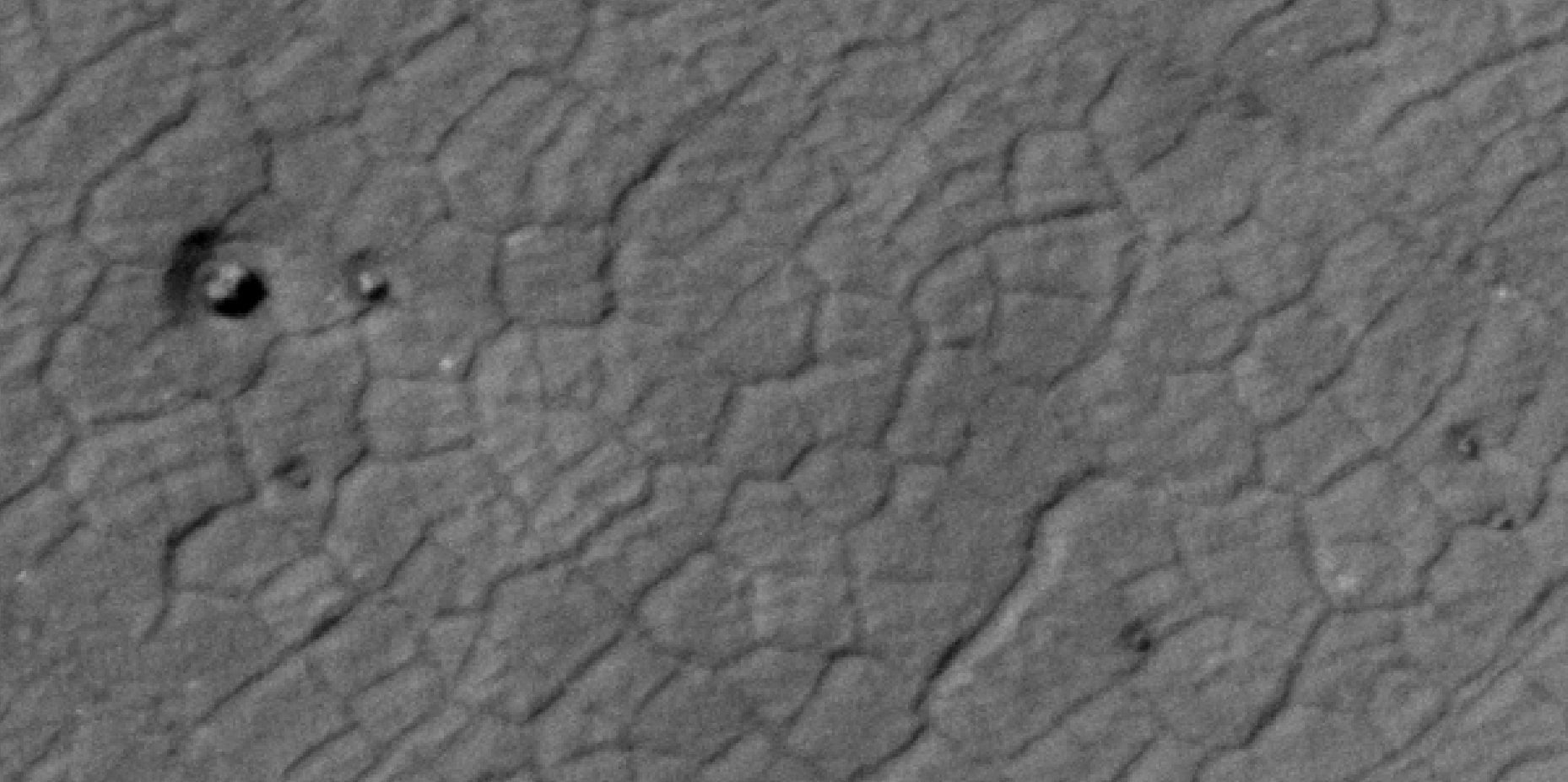
Close view of polygons, as seen by HiRISE under HiWish program

== On the Earth ==
On the Earth, polygonal, patterned ground is present in ice-rich ground, especially in polar regions.

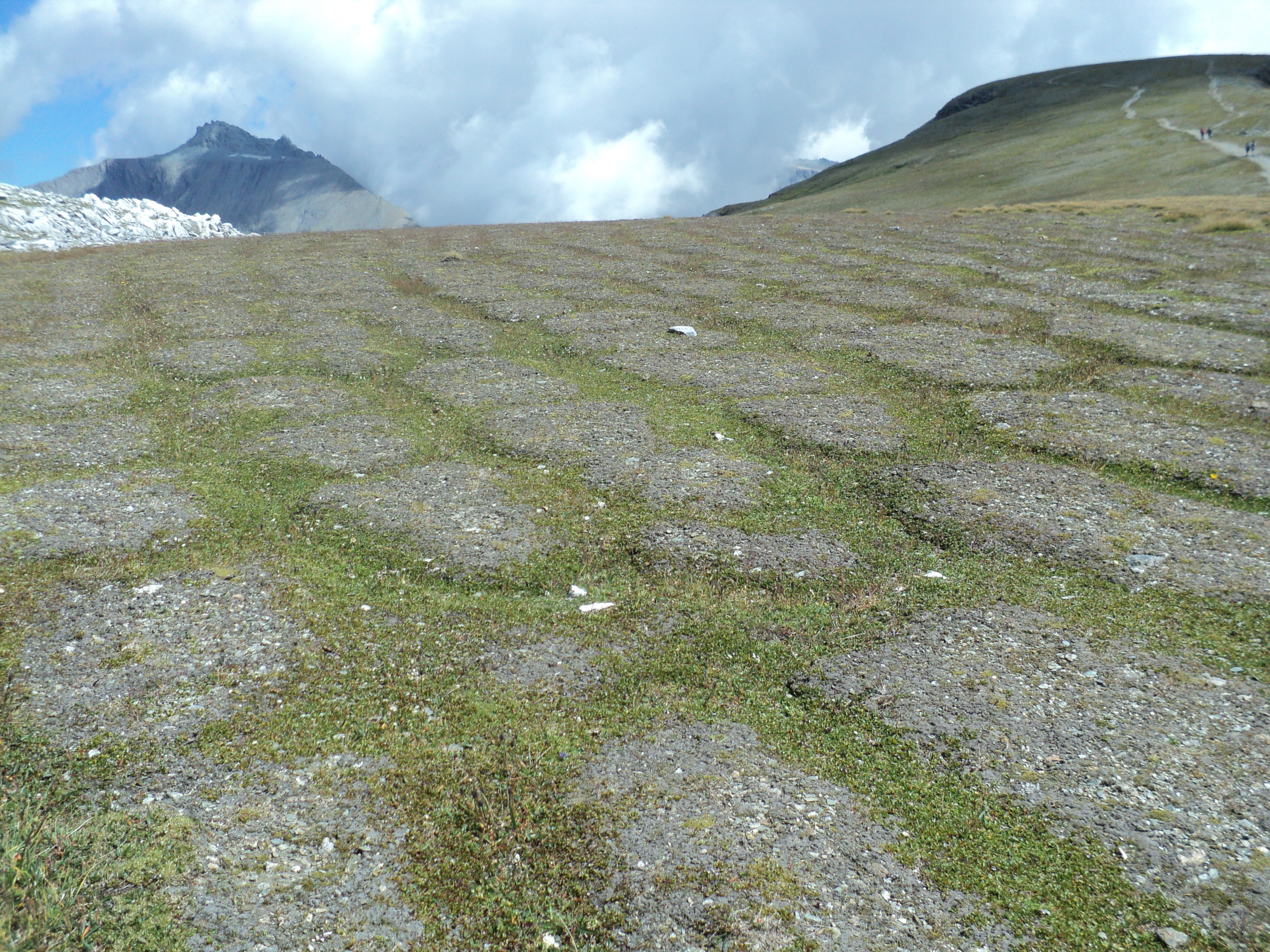
Patterned ground on Earth.

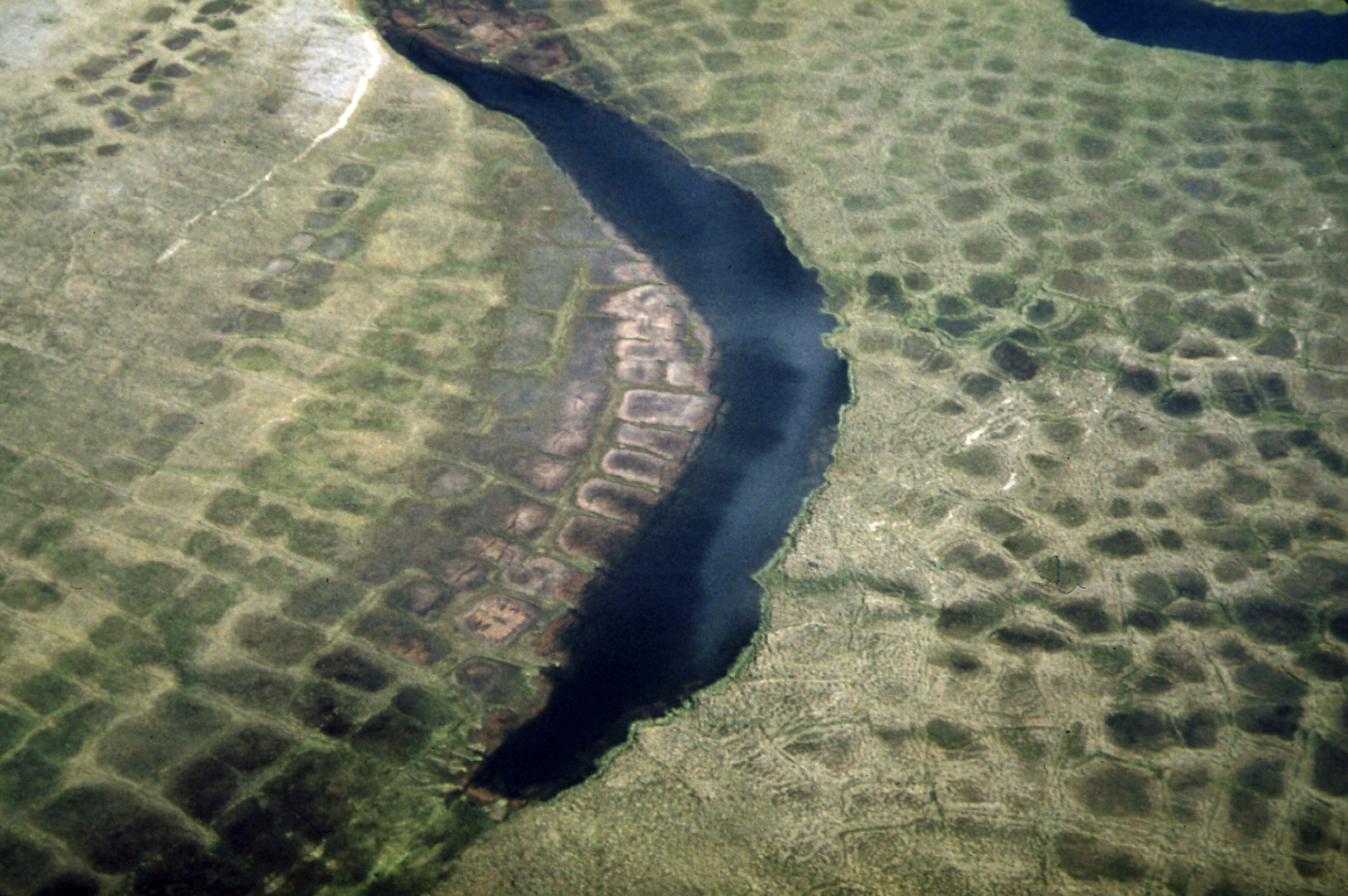
Patterned ground in Alaska

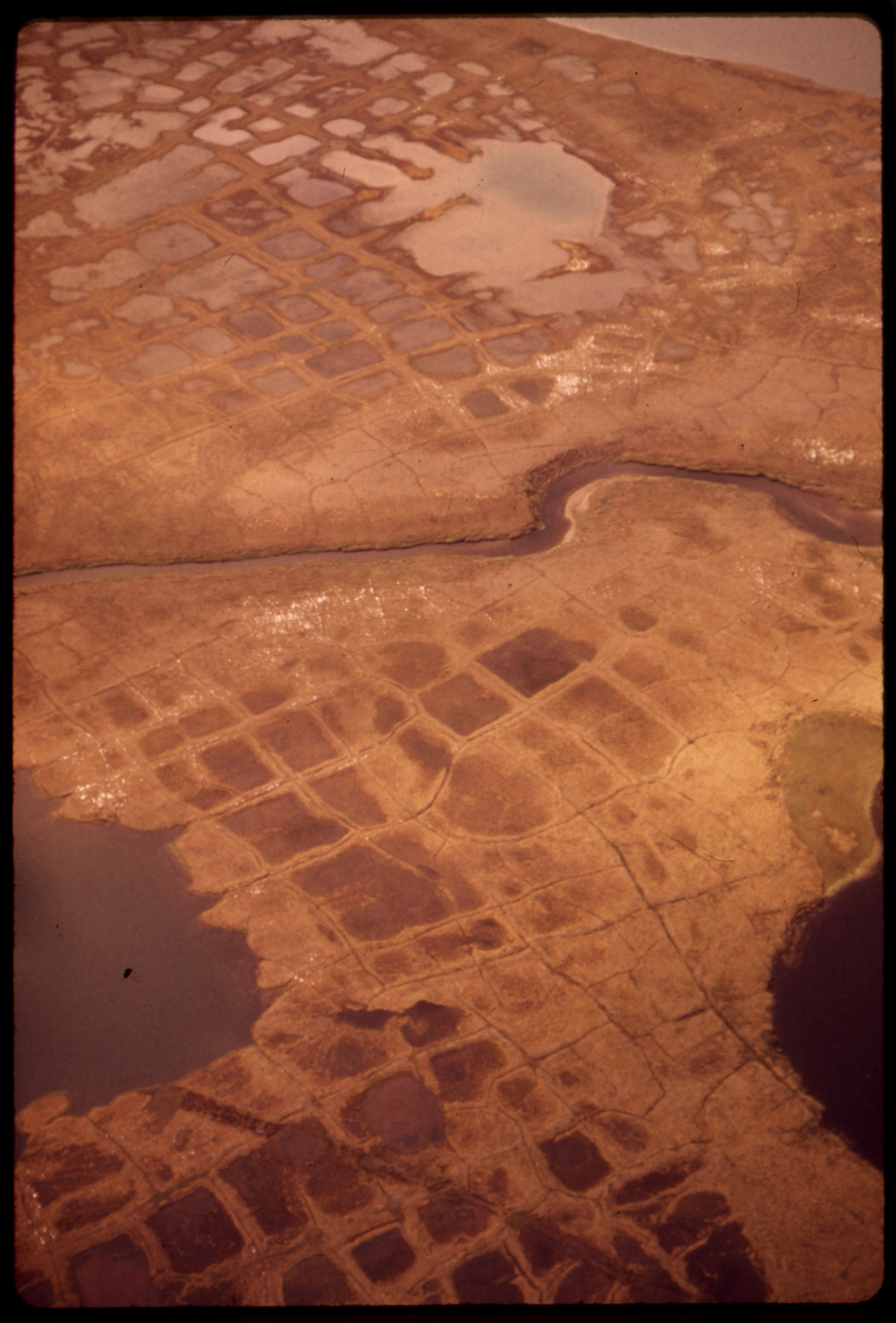
Patterned ground in Alaska. The center is lower; hence full of water. This scene is like low-center polygons on Mars—but with water.

== See also ==
- Casius quadrangle
- Climate of Mars
- Ismenius Lacus quadrangle
- Latitude dependent mantle
- Patterned ground
- Mudcrack
