= Latitude dependent mantle =

Much of the Martian surface is covered with a thick ice-rich, mantle layer that has fallen from the sky a number of times in the past. In some places a number of layers are visible in the mantle.

It fell as snow and ice-coated dust. There is good evidence that this mantle is ice-rich. The shapes of the polygons common on many surfaces suggest ice-rich soil. High levels of hydrogen (probably from water) have been found with Mars Odyssey. Thermal measurements from orbit suggest ice. The Phoenix (spacecraft) discovered water ice with made direct observations since it landed in a field of polygons. In fact, its landing rockets exposed pure ice. Theory had predicted that ice would be found under a few cm of soil. This mantle layer is called "latitude dependent mantle" because its occurrence is related to the latitude. It is this mantle that cracks and then forms polygonal ground. This cracking of ice-rich ground is predicted based on physical processes. Another type of surface is called "brain terrain" as it looks like the surface of a human brain. Brain terrain lies under polygonal ground when the two are both visible in a region.

Since the top, polygon layer is fairly smooth although the underlying brain terrain is irregular; it is believed that the mantle layer that contains the polygons needs to be 10–20 meters thick to smooth out the irregularities. The mantle layer lasts for a very long time before all the ice is gone because a protective lag deposit forms on the top. The mantle contains ice and dust. After a certain amount of ice disappears from sublimation the dust stays on the top, forming the lag deposit.

The total amount of water locked up in the mantle has been calculated based on the total area of polygonal ground and an estimated depth of 10 meters. This volume is equal to a layer 2.5 meters deep spread over the entire planet. This compares to a 30-meter depth over the whole planet for the water locked up in the north and south polar caps.

Mantle forms when the Martian climate is different than the present climate. The tilt or obliquity of the axis of the planet changes a great deal. The Earth’s tilt changes little because our rather large moon stabilizes the Earth. Mars only has two very small moons that do not possess enough gravity to stabilize its tilt. When the tilt of Mars exceeds around 40 degrees (from today's 25 degrees), ice is deposited in certain latitude bands where much mantle exists today.

== See also ==
- Climate of Mars
