= Javier Gil =

Javier Gil may refer to:

- Javier Gil Valle (born 1961), known as Javivi, Spanish actor
- Javier Gil Sevillano (fl. 1978-present), Spanish professor of engineering
- Javier Gil (footballer) (born 2006), Spanish footballer
