= Adolph Lomb Medal =

Prize in optics

The Adolph Lomb Medal, awarded by the Optical Society, is a prize for young scientists (within 10 years of their highest degree) for their contributions to optics. It is named after Adolph Lomb, treasurer of the Optical Society of America from its founding until his death in 1942.

== Medal winners ==
- 1940 David MacAdam
- 1942 James G. Baker
- 1944 R. Clark Jones
- 1946 Wayne G. Norton
- 1948 David S. Grey
- 1950 H. Richard Blackwell
- 1952 Aden B. Meinel
- 1954 William Sinton
- 1956 Walter R. J. Brown
- 1958 Edward L. O'Neill
- 1960 Ian Mills
- 1962 Jean-Pierre Barrat
- 1964 Gordon H. Spencer
- 1966 C. Kumar Patel
- 1968 Douglas C. Sinclair
- 1970 Marlan O. Scully
- 1972 Robert L. Byer
- 1974 James Forsyth
- 1976 Marc D. Levenson
- 1978 Eli Yablonovitch
- 1980 David M. Bloom
- 1982 Won T. Tsang
- 1984 Edward H. Adelson
- 1986 David A. B. Miller
- 1988 Janis A. Valdmanis
- 1990 Andrew M. Weiner
- 1992 David F. Welch
- 1992 Mohammed N. Islam
- 1993 Henry C. Kapteyn
- 1994 Robert W. Schoenlein
- 1995 Turan Erdoğan
- 1996 Frederick A. Kish Jr.
- 1997 Ekmel Özbay
- 1998 Benjamin J. Eggleton
- 1999 Jun Ye
- 2000 Mikhail Lukin
- 2001 Barbara A. Paldus
- 2002 Susana Marcos Celestino
- 2003 Alexei Vladimirovich Sokolov
- 2004 Randy Bartels
- 2005 Marin Soljacic
- 2006 John Charles Howell
- 2007 Shanhui Fan
- 2008 L. Cary Gunn
- 2009 Rebekah A. Drezek
- 2010 Jeremy O'Brien
- 2011 Elizabeth Hillman
- 2012 Hatice Altug
- 2013 Andrea Alù
- 2014 Alexander Szameit
- 2015 Jeremy N. Munday
- 2016 Jennifer Dionne
- 2017 Dirk Robert Englund
- 2018 Andrei Faraon
- 2019 Laura Na Liu
- 2020 Chaoyang Lu
- 2021 Laura Waller
- 2022 Ido Kaminer
- 2023 William Renninger
- 2024 Deep Jariwala
- 2025 Peter McMahon
- 2026 Sergio Carbajo

== See also ==
- List of physics awards
