= Sinton (crater) =

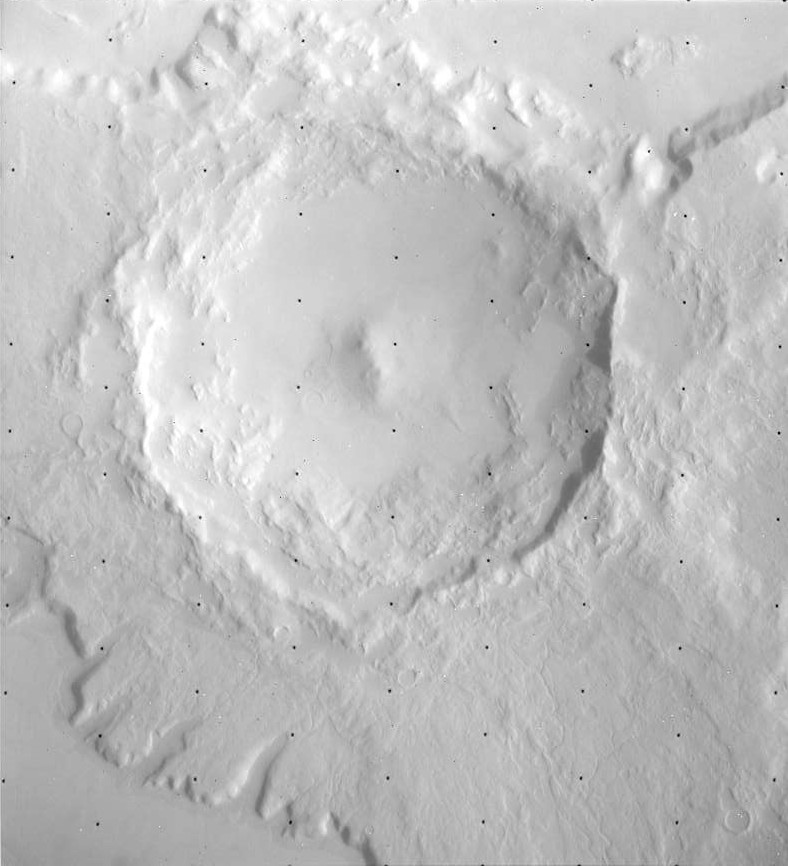
- Viking Orbiter 1 image
- Planet: Mars
- Region: Ismenius Lacus quadrangle
- Coordinates: 42.7°N 328.35°W
- Quadrangle: Ismenius Lacus
- Diameter: 65.25 km (40.54 mi)
- Eponym: William M. Sinton

Sinton is a crater in the Ismenius Lacus quadrangle on Mars. Sinton crater lies in the northern hemisphere, south of the very large crater Lyot and west of Ismeniae Fossae. It was named after Harvard astronomer William M. Sinton. The name was approved in 2007.

== Description ==
Sinton crater is believed to have been caused by an impact into an icefield. This impact melted ice and produced many branched valleys. Some of these can be seen in one of the images below. Evidence of an icefield is lineated valley fill (LVF) and lobate debris aprons (LDA) in the region. Some of this evidence can be seen in one of the images below.

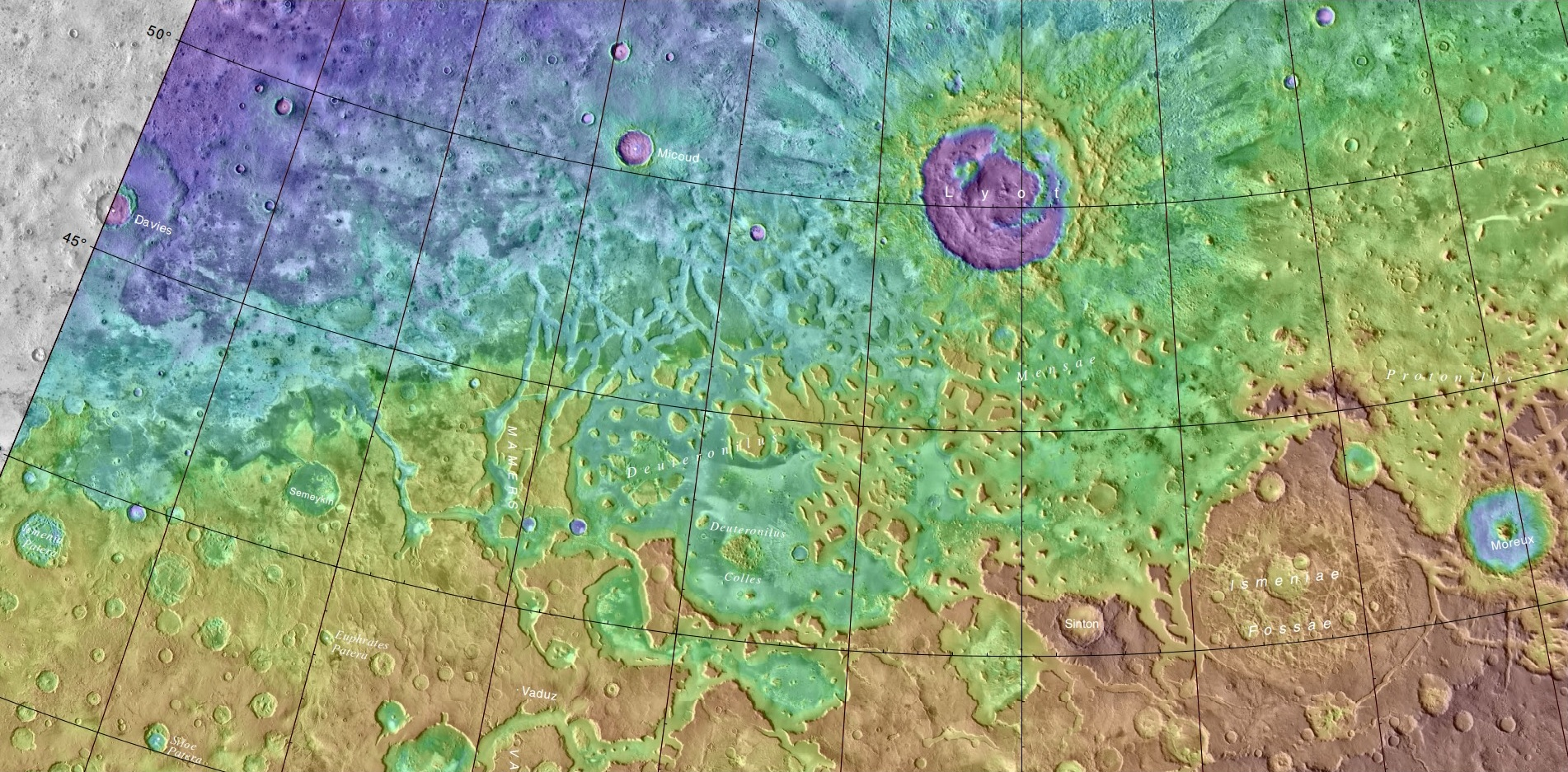
MOLA map of Sinton crater and other nearby craters. Colors indicate elevations.

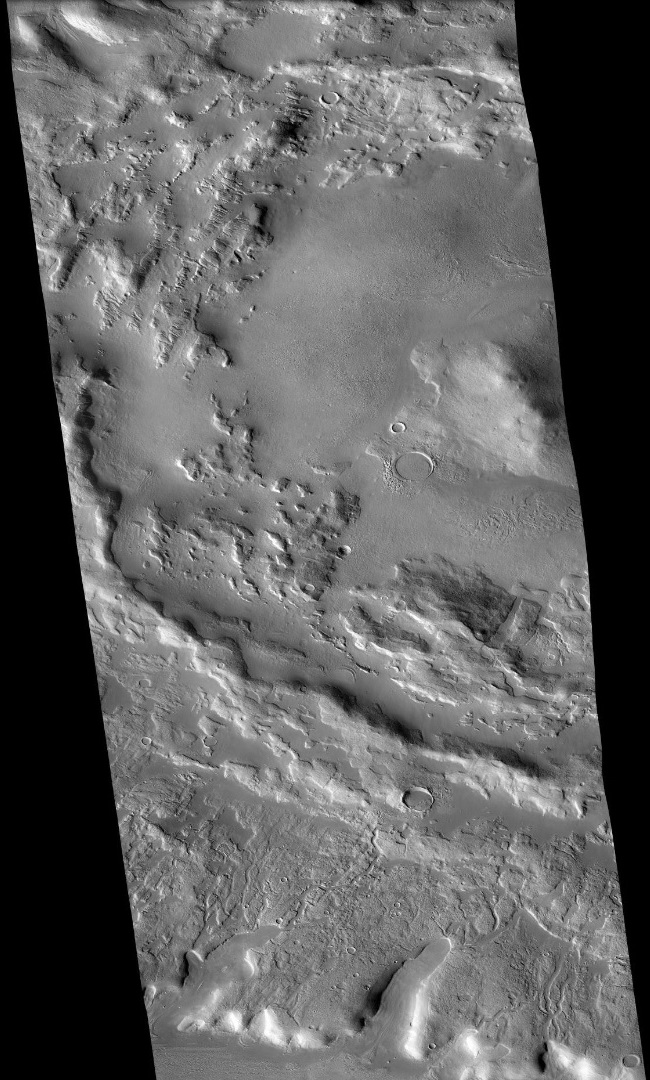
West side of Sinton, as seen by CTX camera (on MRO).

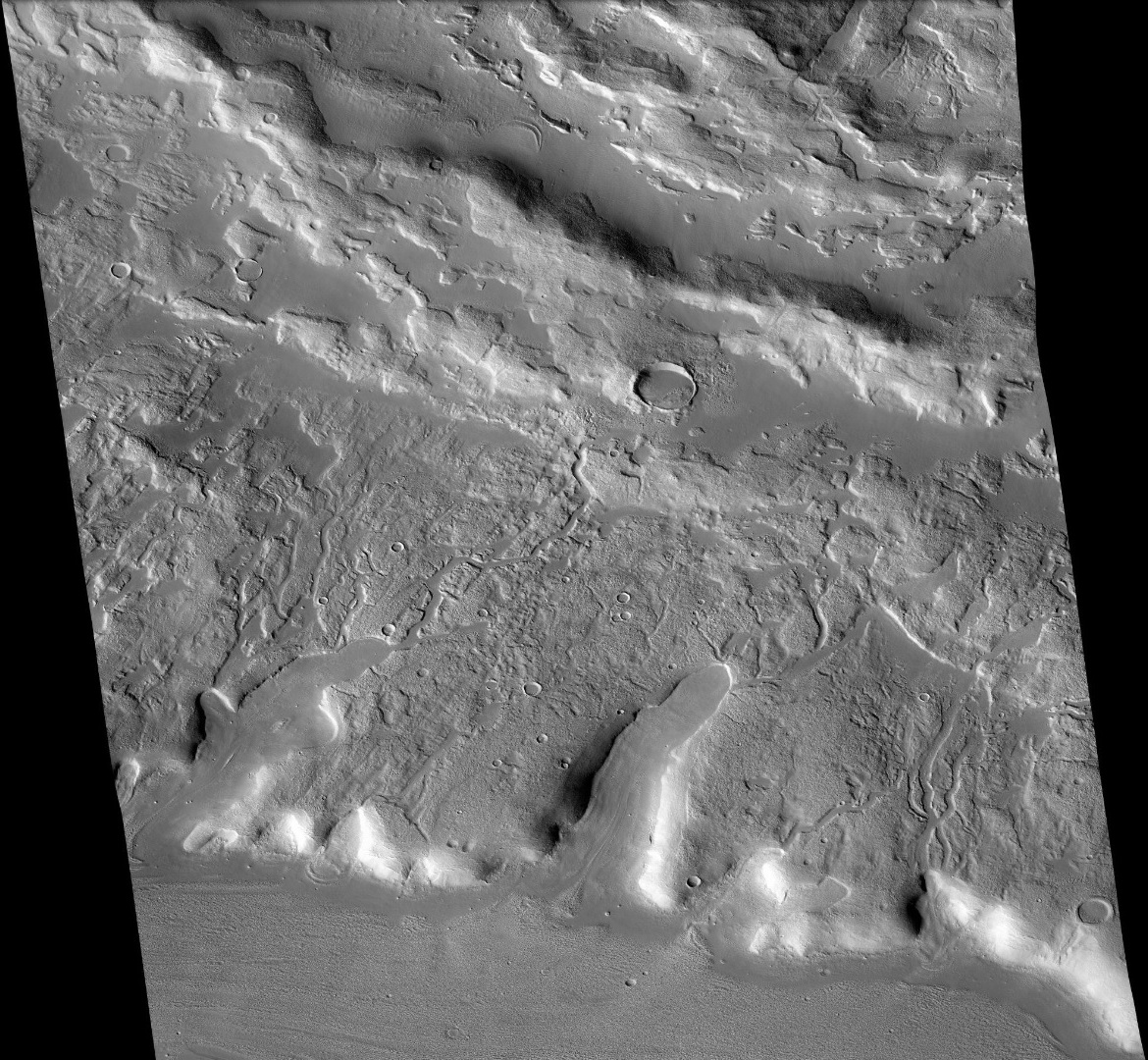
Channels just to south of Sinton, as seen by CTX camera. These were created when the impact occurred in ice-rich ground. Note: this is an enlargement of the previous image of west side of Sinton.

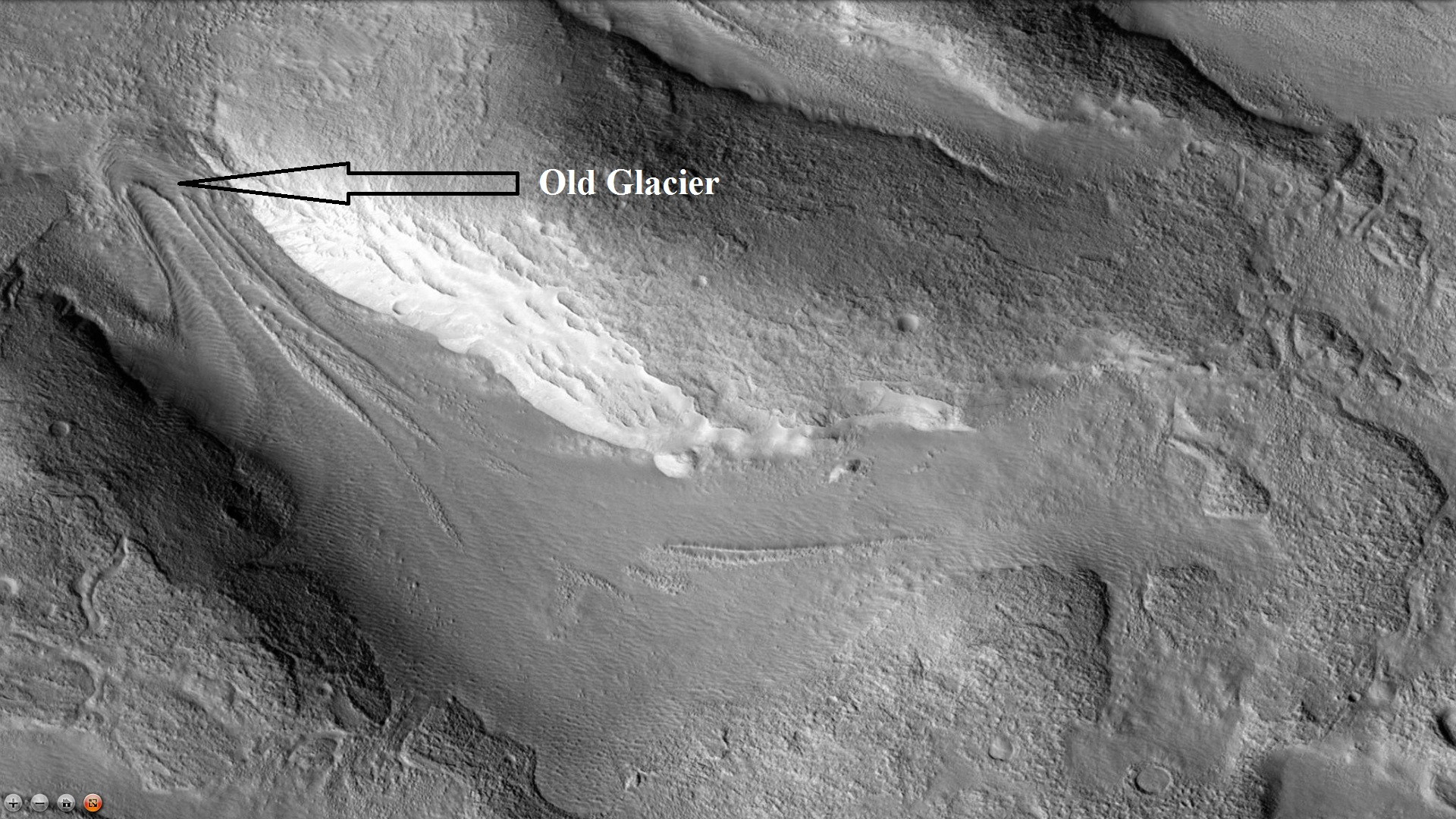
Old glacier just to north of Sinton, as seen by CTX camera. This is one of many glaciers in the region. Note: this is an enlargement of a previous image of west side of Sinton.

== See also ==
- Climate of Mars
- Geological history of Mars
- Geology of Mars
- Glacier
- Glaciers on Mars
- Impact event
- Ismenius Lacus quadrangle
- List of craters on Mars
- Ore resources on Mars
- Planetary nomenclature
- Water on Mars
