= Rebekah Drezek =

American bioengineer and academic

Rebekah Anna Drezek
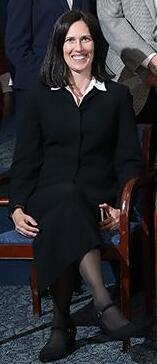
- Drezek at the 118th Advisory Committee to the NIH director in 2019
- Education: University of Texas, Austin; Duke University
- Scientific career
- Workplaces: Rice University; MD Anderson Cancer Center
- Thesis: The biophysical origins of cervical tissue fluorescence and reflectance spectra : modeling, measurements, and clinical implications (2001)

Rebekah Anna Drezek is an American bioengineer who is Professor of Bioengineering, Electrical and Computer Engineering at Rice University. She also serves as the Associate Chair of the Department of Bioengineering there. Her research uses optical molecular imaging for in vivo assessment of biological tissue. She is a Fellow of the American Institute for Medical and Biological Engineering and was awarded the 2009 Optica Adolph Lomb Medal.

== Early life and education ==
Drezek studied electrical engineering at Duke University. She moved to the University of Texas at Austin for graduate studies, and studied the fluorescence and reflectance spectra of cervical tissue.

== Research and career ==
The optical approaches developed by Drezek can provide quantitative disease detection and diagnosis without the need for invasive investigations.

Drezek develops molecular imaging technologies to examine tissue pathology and nanoparticle interactions in vivo. She has developed nanoscale scientific tools (e.g. nanoparticles and quantum dot probes) for molecular imaging and the assessment of tumor margins. She works with clinicians and pharmaceutical scientists for anti-cancer vaccines and adjuvant therapies. Her work has been published in 118 papers and has led to four patents.

Drezek has her own lab at Rice University called The Optical Molecular Imaging and Nanobiotechnology Laboratory. The research conducted there consists of two types of projects that are predominantly focused on their applications to breast cancer: the aforementioned research to develop molecular imaging technologies to examine tissue pathology, and the development of nanoengineered probes to provide molecular specificity. Her lab collaborates with other research groups at the university, as well as associates at the Texas Medical Center and other areas around the world.

== Awards and honors ==
- 2004 MIT magazine 100 Top Young Innovators Award
- 2005 Association for the Advancement of Medical Instrumentation Becton Dickinson Career Achievement Award
- 2005 Beckman Young Investigator Award
- 2006 National Academy of Engineering Frontiers of Engineering
- 2007 Department of Defense Era of Hope Scholar
- 2008 American Society for Photobiology Research Award
- 2008 Fellow of the American Institute for Medical and Biological Engineering
- 2009 Adolph Lomb Medal

== Selected publications ==
- Nastassja A Lewinski; Vicki Colvin; Rebekah Drezek (1 January 2008). "Cytotoxicity of nanoparticles". Small. 4 (1): 26–49. doi:10.1002/smll.200700595. ISSN 1613-6810. PMID 18165959. Wikidata Q29615460.
- Christopher Loo; Amanda Lowery; Naomi Halas; Jennifer West; Rebekah Drezek (April 2005). "Immunotargeted nanoshells for integrated cancer imaging and therapy". Nano Letters. 5 (4): 709–11. doi:10.1021/nl050127s. ISSN 1530-6984. PMID 15826113. Wikidata Q57133740.
- André M Gobin; Min Ho Lee; Naomi J Halas; William D James; Rebekah A Drezek; Jennifer L West (6 June 2007). "Near-infrared resonant nanoshells for combined optical imaging and photothermal cancer therapy". Nano Letters. 7 (7): 1929–1934. doi:10.1021/nl070610y. ISSN 1530-6984. PMID 17550297. Wikidata Q40123632.
