= Defence Scientific Advisory Council =

The Defence Scientific Advisory Council (DSAC) is a non-departmental public body consisting of an independent committee of scientists who provide scientific and technological advice to the British Ministry of Defence. Secretariat services for the DSAC are provided by the Defence Science and Technology Office.

The chair of the DSAC was Peter Trier from 1981-1985.

The DSAC was chaired by Professor David Delpy from 2014 to 2016.

After a review of Non-Departmental Public Bodies the DSAC was reclassified from an Advisory Non-Departmental Public Body to an Expert Committee in October 2016. The replacement body, known as the Defence Science Expert Committee (DSEC) will continue to provide science and technology advice across MOD.
