= William M. Sinton =

American astronomer (1925–2004)

- Born: April 11, 1925; Baltimore, US
- Died: March 16, 2004 (aged 78); Flagstaff, Arizona, US
- Education: Johns Hopkins University (AB, 1949) (PhD, 1953)
- Known for: Spectroscopic studies of Mars that appeared to support the existence of plants on Mars
- Spouse: Marjorie Korner
- Awards: Adolph Lomb Medal (1954)
- Scientific career
- Fields: Infrared astronomy
- Workplaces: Harvard College Observatory; Smithsonian Astrophysical Observatory; Lowell Observatory; University of Hawaii

William Merz Sinton (April 11, 1925 – March 16, 2004) was a Harvard astronomer whose 1950s studies seemed to support the existence of Martian vegetation. A crater on Mars is named after him. He received many awards and recognitions, including the 1954 Adolph Lomb Medal from OSA. He was also elected an OSA Fellow in 1961. During his lifetime, he published over 100 scientific papers and two books.

== Works ==
- Sinton, William M.; Strong, John (1960). "Radiometric Observations of Mars". Astrophysical Journal. 131: 459–469. Bibcode:1960ApJ...131..459S. doi:10.1086/146852.
- Sinton, William M.; Strong, John (1960). "Radiometric Observations of Venus". Astrophysical Journal. 131: 470–490. Bibcode:1960ApJ...131..470S. doi:10.1086/146853.
- Miczaika, G.R.; Sinton, William M. (1961). Tools of the astronomer. Cambridge Harvard University Press. OCLC 977268803.
