= Elizabeth Hillman =

Physicist

- Born: Elizabeth Marjorie Clare Hillman
- Education: University College London (BSc, PhD)
- Awards: Adolph Lomb Medal (2011)
- Scientific career
- Workplaces: Harvard Medical School; Columbia University
- Thesis: Experimental and theoretical investigations of near infrared tomographic imaging methods and clinical applications (2002)
- Doctoral advisor: Jeremy C. Hebden; David Delpy
- Website: orion.bme.columbia.edu/~hillman

Elizabeth M. C. Hillman is a British-born academic who is Professor of Biomedical Engineering and Radiology at Columbia University. She was awarded the 2011 Adolph Lomb Medal from The Optical Society and the 2018 SPIE Biophotonics Technology Innovator Award.

== Education ==
Hillman studied physics at University College London, and graduated with a combined B.Sc. and M.Sc. degree in 1998. She earned her PhD in Medical Physics and Bioengineering in 2002. After completing her thesis, supervised by Jeremy C. Hebden and David Delpy, she joined a biotech start-up in Boston. During her PhD, she used optical tomography to image biological tissue.

== Career ==
Hillman joined Massachusetts General Hospital as a postdoctoral research fellow in 2003. She was appointed assistant professor at Columbia University in 2006. She set up the Laboratory for Functional Optical Imaging and developed new techniques for in vivo optical imaging. She developed an optical imaging technique that used dynamic contrast to image the anatomy of small animals. She licensed this Dynamic Contrast molecular imaging technique to CRi, now PerkinElmer. In 2008, she was awarded the Columbia Rodriguez Junior Faculty Award. She was awarded the Optical Society of America’s Adolph Lomb medal in 2011. In 2010, she was awarded a National Science Foundation CAREER Award to study in vivo Interventional Microscopy. She has explored several optical imaging techniques for biomedical research. She has received over thirty large grants to support her research.

In 2017, Hillman began to work at Columbia's Zuckerman Mind Brain Behavior Institute. With Francesco Pavone, Hillman founded The Optical Society Optics and the Brain Topical Meeting in 2015. She identified that the vascular endothelium is important in regulation of blood flow in the brain. She has written for Scientific American. She was elected to the American Institute for Medical and Biological Engineering in 2017. She has developed tools for high speed imaging of the activity in the whole brain. Hillman pioneered Swept, Confocally-Aligned Planar Excitation (SCAPE) microscopy, which combines light-sheet microscopy and laser scanning confocal microscopy. The technique uses a single objective lens to excite and detect fluorescence from a sample. She has also developed laminar optical tomography and advanced applications of two-photon microscopy.

== Awards and honors ==
- 2007, Wallace H Coulter Foundation Early Career Award
- 2007, Human Frontier of Science Program Young Investigator Award
- 2008, Columbia Rodriguez Junior Faculty Award
- 2010, National Science Foundation Career award
- 2011, Adolph Lomb Medal from The Optical Society
- 2015, Fellow of The Optical Society
- 2018, SPIE Biophotonics Technology Innovator Award
