= Javier Gil Sevillano =

Professor at Tecnun University

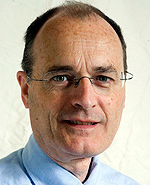
- Professor Javier Gil Sevillano (CEIT, 2010)
- Citizenship: Spanish
- Education: Katholieke Universiteit Leuven
- Known for: Professor of materials engineering at Tecnun and head of Materials Research at CEIT
- Awards: Mordica Memorial Award
- Scientific career
- Fields: Materials engineering

Javier Gil Sevillano is the current professor of materials engineering at the Tecnun School of Engineering of the University of Navarra in Spain, and head of the Materials Department at CEIT Research Institute.

A graduate in metallurgical engineering from the University of Navarra, Professor Gil Sevillano obtained his PhD in at the Katholieke Universiteit Leuven in Belgium in 1978. The recipient of several awards, Spanish national newspaper El Mundo has described him as "one of the leading scientists in materials research in the country".

Sevillano's research has focused on the mechanical stress–strain response, structural evolution, texture development and fracture of materials undergoing large plastic strains. He has participated in more than 40 national and international research projects, has directed doctoral theses and is the author or co-author of about 130 scientific papers in refereed journals in the areas of materials science and technology.

Sevilliano received the Spanish Association of Scientists Plaque of Honor in 2005.

He received a 2000 Medal from the Spanish Fracture Group and the 2010 Mordica Memorial Award from the Wire Association International (WAI).
