= David Delpy =

British bioengineer

David Delpy CBE FRS FMedSci FREng
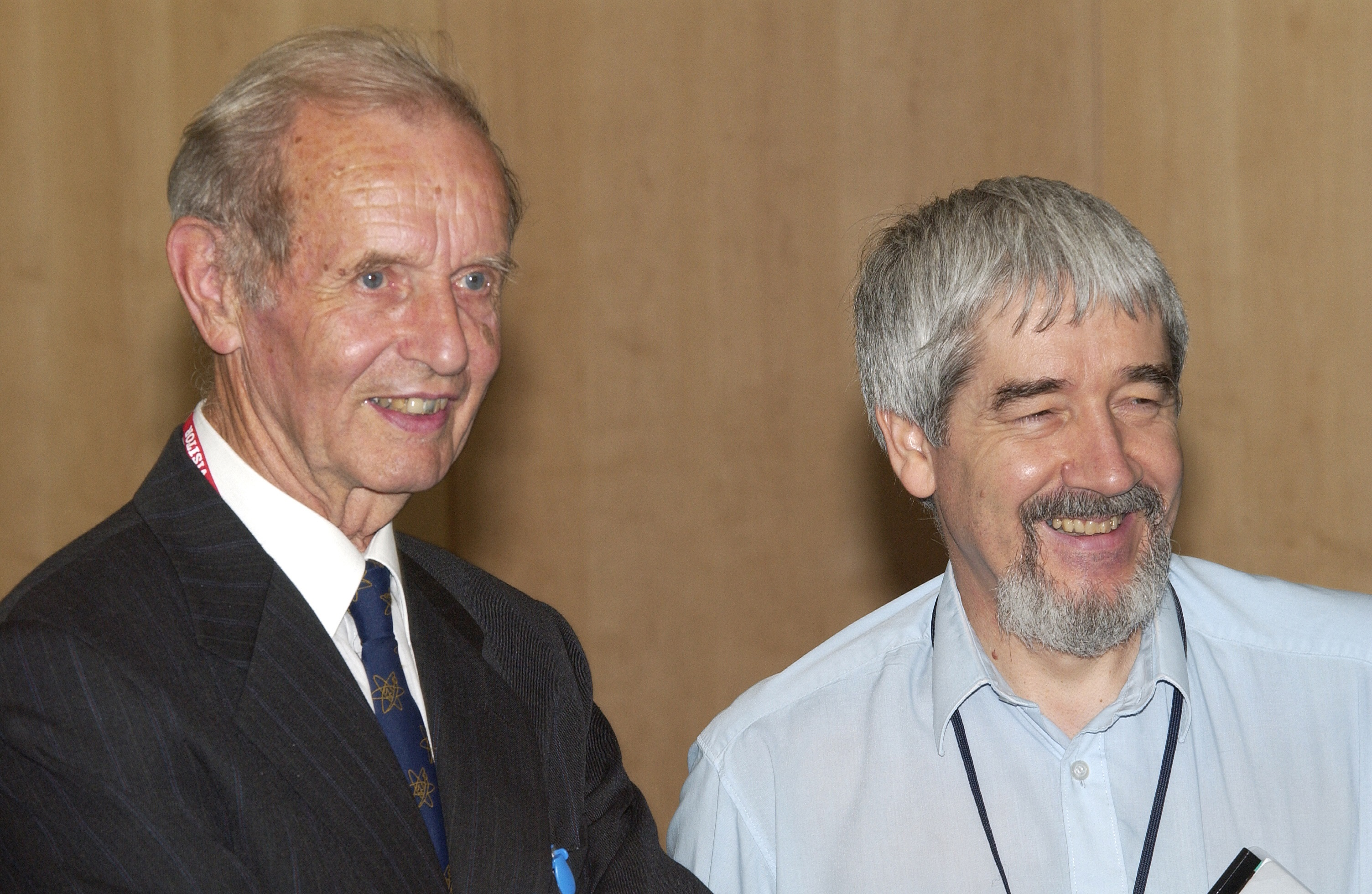
- Delpy (right)
- Born: David Thomas Delpy; 11 August 1948 (age 78)
- Education: Heaton Grammar School; Brunel University (BSc)
- Known for: CEO of EPSRC
- Awards: Doctor of Science
- Scientific career
- Fields: Medical physics; Photonics
- Workplaces: University College London
- Doctoral students: Elizabeth Hillman
- Website: epsrc.ukri.org/about/people/daviddelpy/

David Thomas Delpy (born 11 August 1948) is a British bioengineer, and Hamamatsu Professor of Medical Photonics, at University College London.

== Education ==
Delpy was educated at Heaton Grammar School in Newcastle. He went on to study at Brunel University, graduating with a first class Bachelor of Science degree in Applied Physics. He was awarded a Doctor of Science degree by University College London in Medical physics.

== Career and research ==
Delpy was Chief Executive of the Engineering and Physical Sciences Research Council.

As of 2014, he is chairman of the Defence Scientific Advisory Council and a member of the strategic advisory board of the EPSRC's quantum technologies programme.

=== Awards and honours ===
Delpy was appointed CBE in the 2014 Birthday Honours for services to engineering and scientific research. He was elected a Fellow of the Royal Society (FRS) in 1999. He was also elected a Fellow of the Royal Academy of Engineering in 2002.

In 2008 he was awarded the Institute of Physics Rosalind Franklin Medal and Prize.
