= Deuteronilus Mensae =

Mensae on Mars

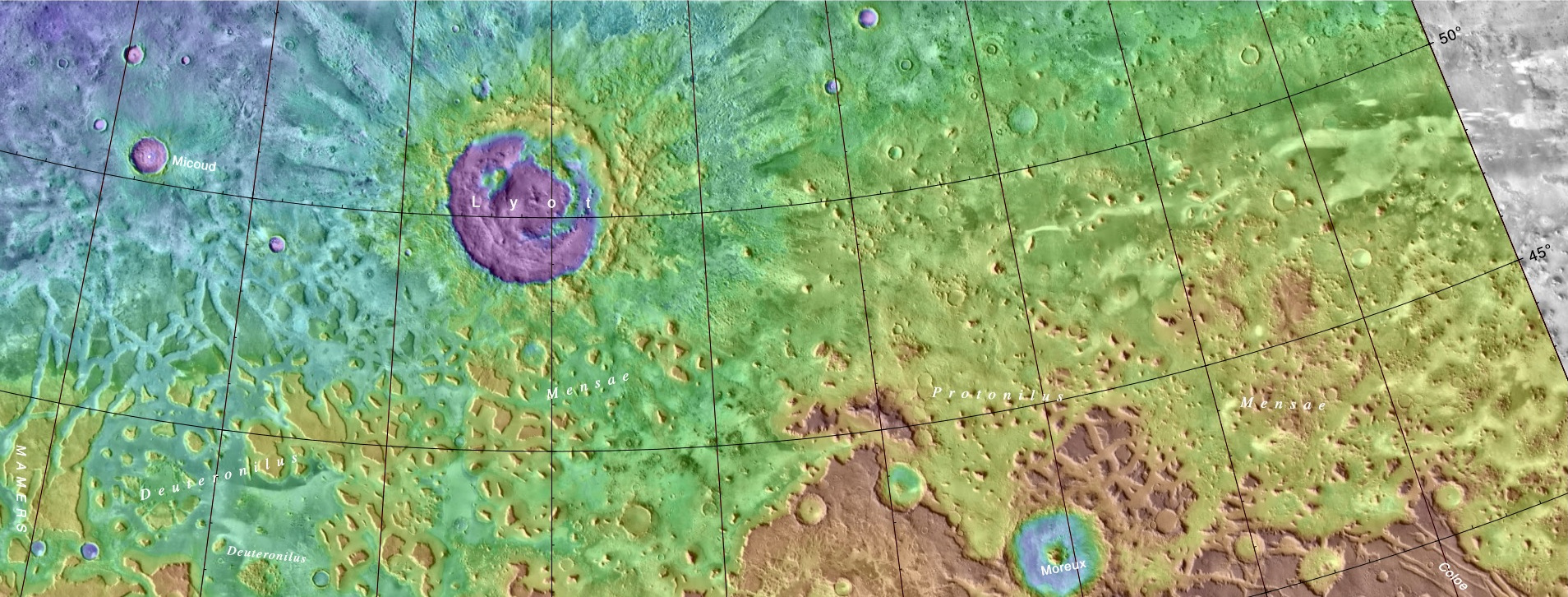
- Map showing the relation of Protonilus and Deuteronilus Mensae to other nearby regions. Colors refer to altitudes.
- Coordinates: 43.9°N 337.4°W

Deuteronilus Mensae is a region on Mars 937 km across and centered at 43.9°N 337.4°W. It covers 344°–325° West and 40°–48° North. Deuteronilus region lies just to the north of Arabia Terra and is included in the Ismenius Lacus quadrangle. It is along the dichotomy boundary, that is between the old, heavily cratered southern highlands and the low plains of the northern hemisphere. The region contains flat-topped knobby terrain that may have been formed by glaciers at some time in the past. Deuteronilus Mensae is to the immediate west of Protonilus Mensae and Ismeniae Fossae. Glaciers persist in the region in modern times, with at least one glacier estimated to have formed as recently as 100,000 to 10,000 years ago. Recent evidence from the radar on the Mars Reconnaissance Orbiter has shown that parts of Deuteronilus Mensae do indeed contain ice.

== Source of ice ==
It is now widely believed that ice accumulated in many areas of Mars, including Deuteronilus Mensae, when the planet's orbital tilt was very different from now (the axis of Mars has considerable "wobble", meaning its angle changes over time). A few million years ago, the tilt of the axis of Mars was 45 degrees instead of its present 25 degrees. Its tilt, also called obliquity, varies greatly because its two tiny moons cannot stabilize it, like our relatively large moon does the Earth.

Many features on Mars, including Deuteronilus Mensae, are believed to contain large amounts of ice. The most popular model for the origin of the ice is climate change from large changes in the tilt of the planet's rotational axis. At times the tilt has even been greater than 80 degrees Large changes in the tilt explains many ice-rich features on Mars.

Studies have shown that when the tilt of Mars reaches 45 degrees from its current 25 degrees, ice is no longer stable at the poles. Furthermore, at this high tilt, stores of solid carbon dioxide (dry ice) sublimate, thereby increasing the atmospheric pressure. This increased pressure allows more dust to be held in the atmosphere. Moisture in the atmosphere will fall as snow or as ice frozen onto dust grains. Calculations suggest this material will concentrate in the mid-latitudes. General circulation models of the Martian atmosphere predict accumulations of ice-rich dust in the same areas where ice-rich features are found. When the tilt begins to return to lower values, the ice sublimates (turns directly to a gas) and leaves behind a lag of dust. The lag deposit caps the underlying material so with each cycle of high tilt levels, some ice-rich mantle remains behind. Note, that the smooth surface mantle layer probably represents only relative recent material.

== Polygonal patterned ground ==
Polygonal, patterned ground is quite common in some regions of Mars. It is commonly believed to be caused by the sublimation of ice from the ground. Sublimation is the direct change of solid ice to a gas. This is similar to what happens to dry ice on the Earth. Places on Mars that display polygonal ground may indicate where future colonists can find water ice. Patterned ground forms in a mantle layer, called latitude dependent mantle, that fell from the sky when the climate was different.

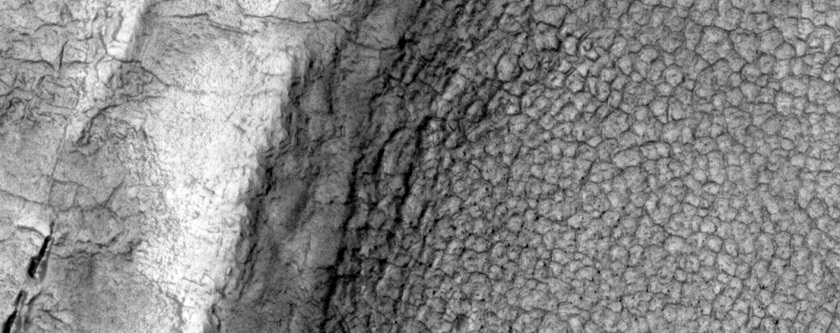
High-center polygons, as seen by HiRISE under HiWish program Image is of the top of a debris apron in Deuteronilus Mensae.

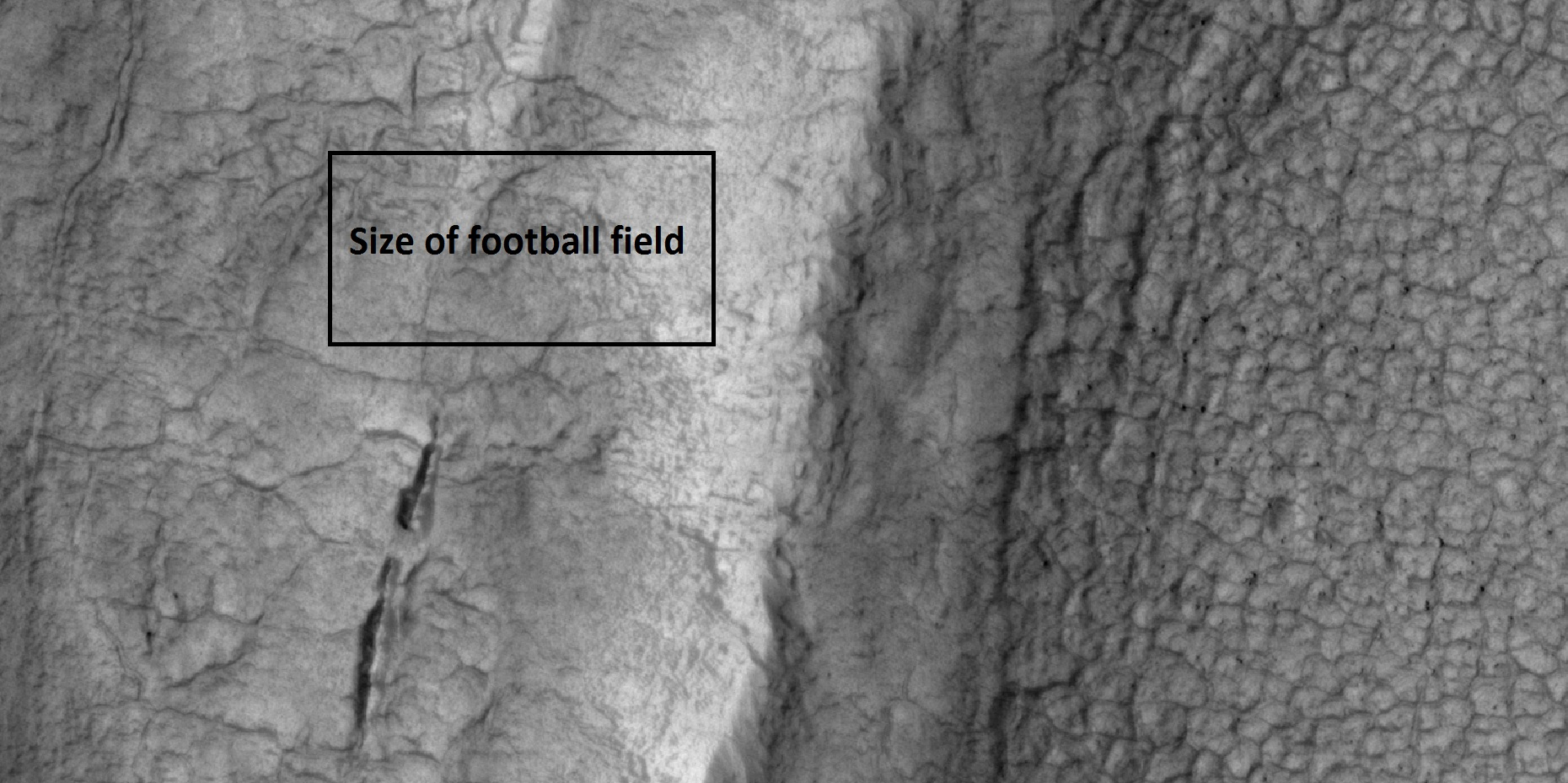
Close up of field of high center polygons with scale, as seen by HiRISE under HiWish program Note: the black box is the size of a football field.

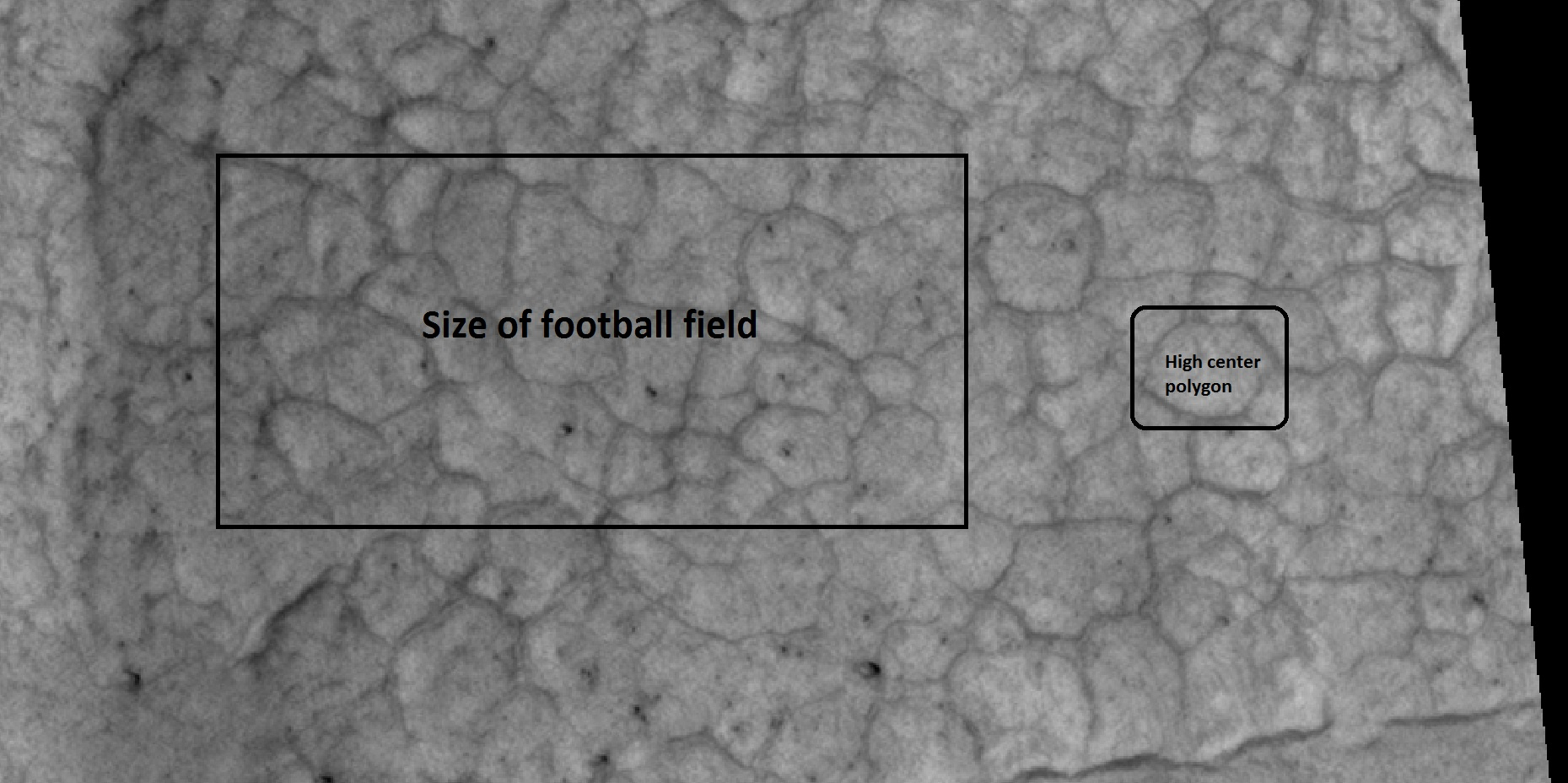
Close-up of high center polygons seen by HiRISE under HiWish program Note: the black box is the size of a football field.

== Upper plains unit ==
Remnants of a 50–100 meter thick mantling, called the upper plains unit, has been discovered in the mid-latitudes of Mars. First investigated in the Deuteronilus Mensae region, but it occurs in other places as well. The remnants consist of sets of dipping layers in craters and along mesas. Sets of dipping layers may be of various sizes and shapes—some look like Aztec pyramids from Central America.

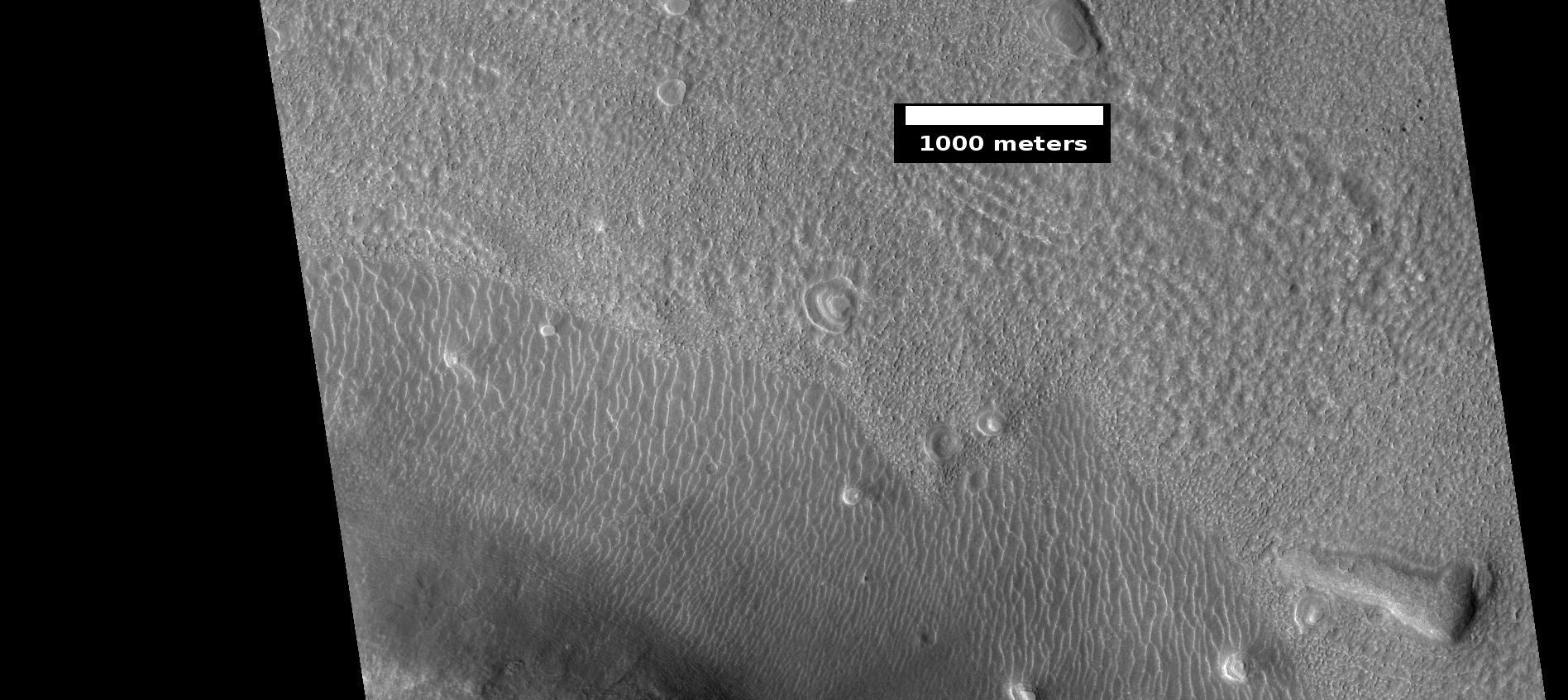
Group of small sets of dipping layers, as seen by HiRISE under HiWish program

This unit also degrades into brain terrain. Brain terrain is a region of maze-like ridges 3–5 meters high. Some ridges may consist of an ice core, so they may be sources of water for future colonists.

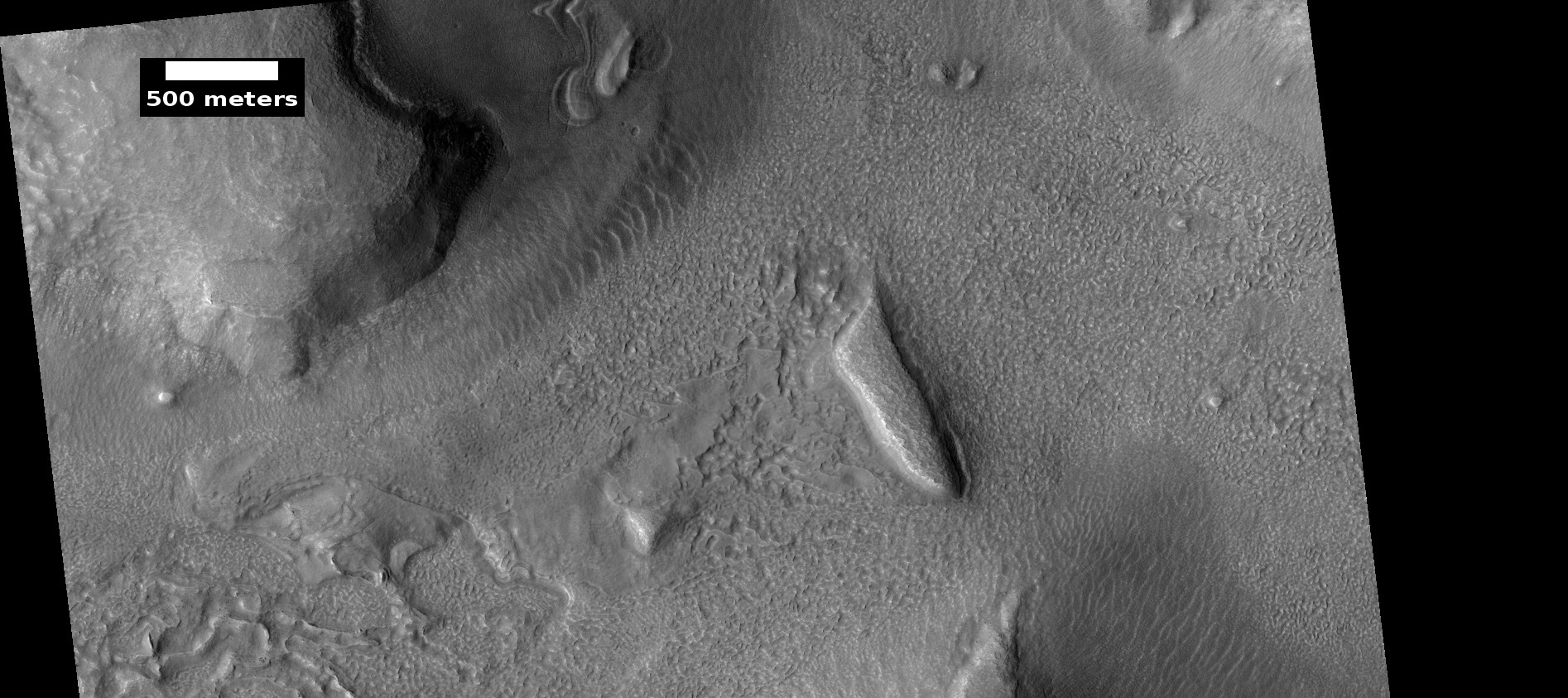
Layered features and brain terrain, as seen by HiRISE under HiWish program The upper plains unit often changes into brain terrain.

Some regions of the upper plains unit display large fractures and troughs with raised rims; such regions are called ribbed upper plains. Fractures are believed to have started with small cracks from stresses. Stress is suggested to initiate the fracture process since ribbed upper plains are common when debris aprons come together or near the edge of debris aprons—such sites would generate compressional stresses. Cracks exposed more surfaces, and consequently more ice in the material sublimates into the planet's thin atmosphere. Eventually, small cracks become large canyons or troughs.

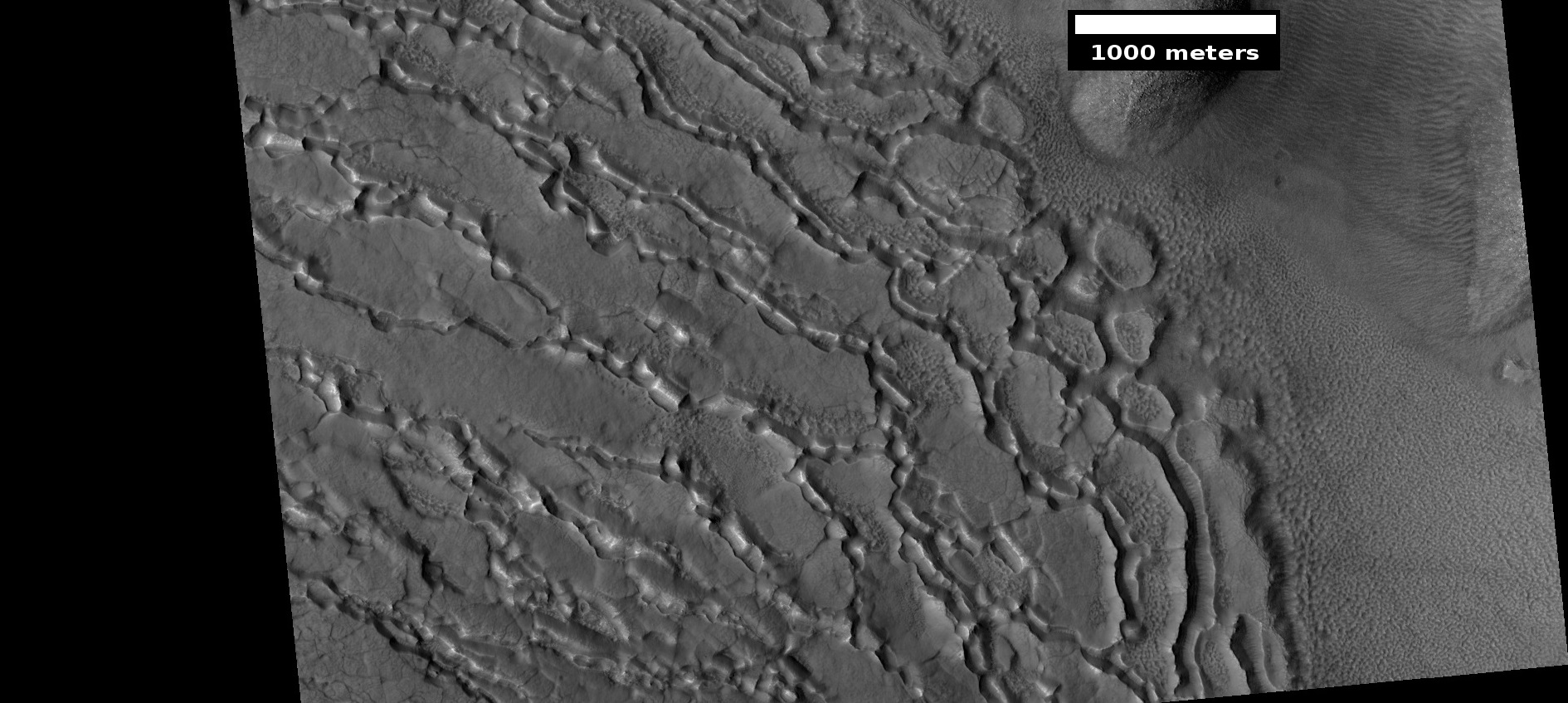
Well developed ribbed upper plains material. These start with small cracks that expand as ice sublimates from the surfaces of the crack. Picture was taken with HiRISE under HiWish program

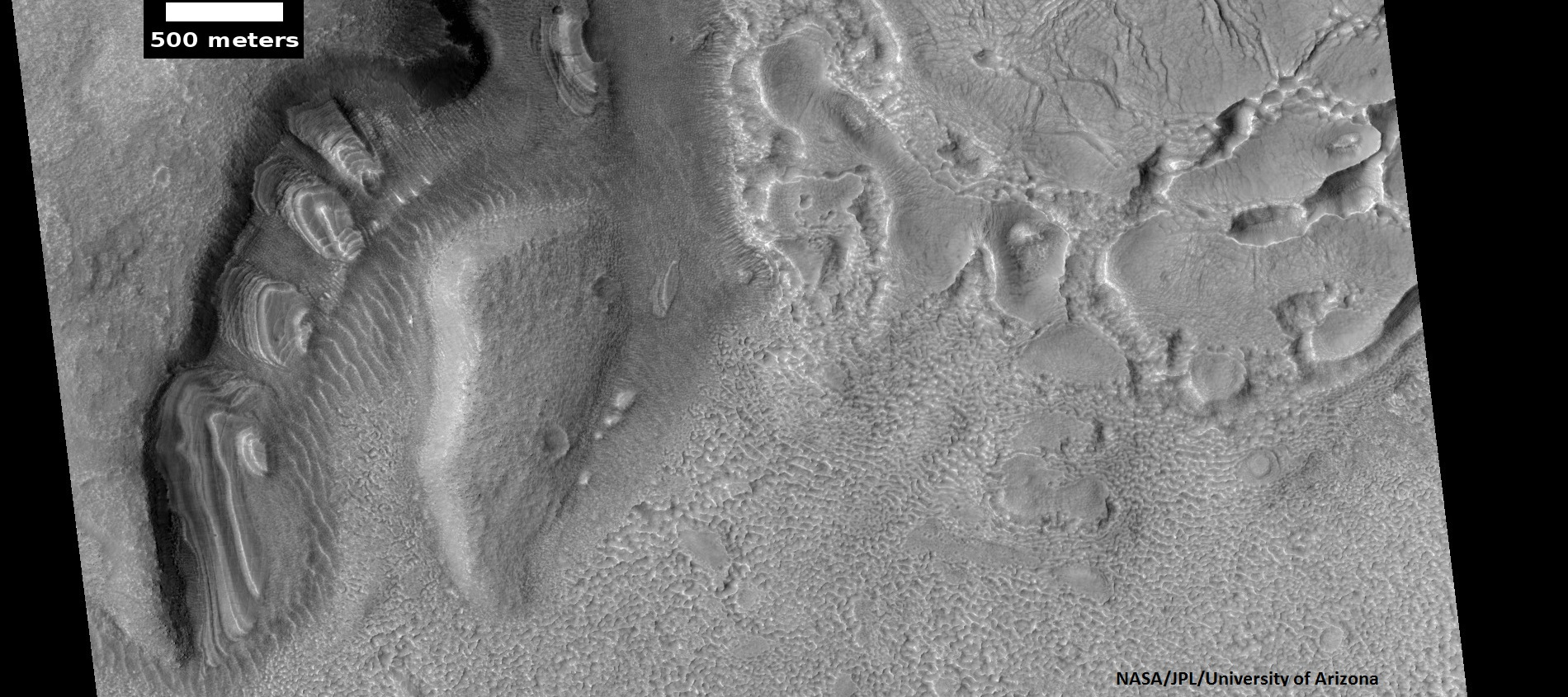
Dipping layers, as seen by HiRISE under HiWish program Also, Ribbed Upper plains material is visible in the upper right of the picture. It is forming from the upper plains unit, and in turn is being eroded into brain terrain.

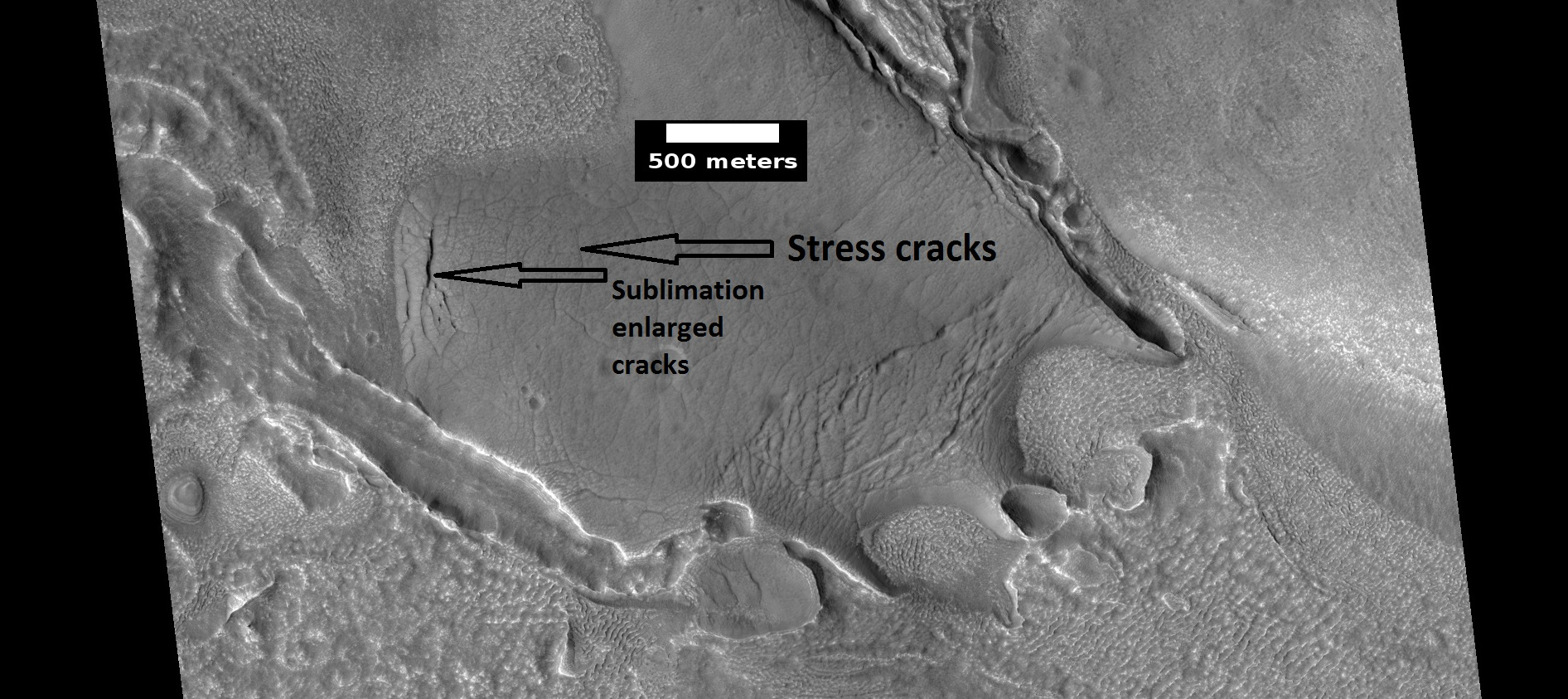
View of stress cracks and larger cracks that have been enlarged by sublimation (ice changing directly into gas) This may be the start of ribbed terrain.

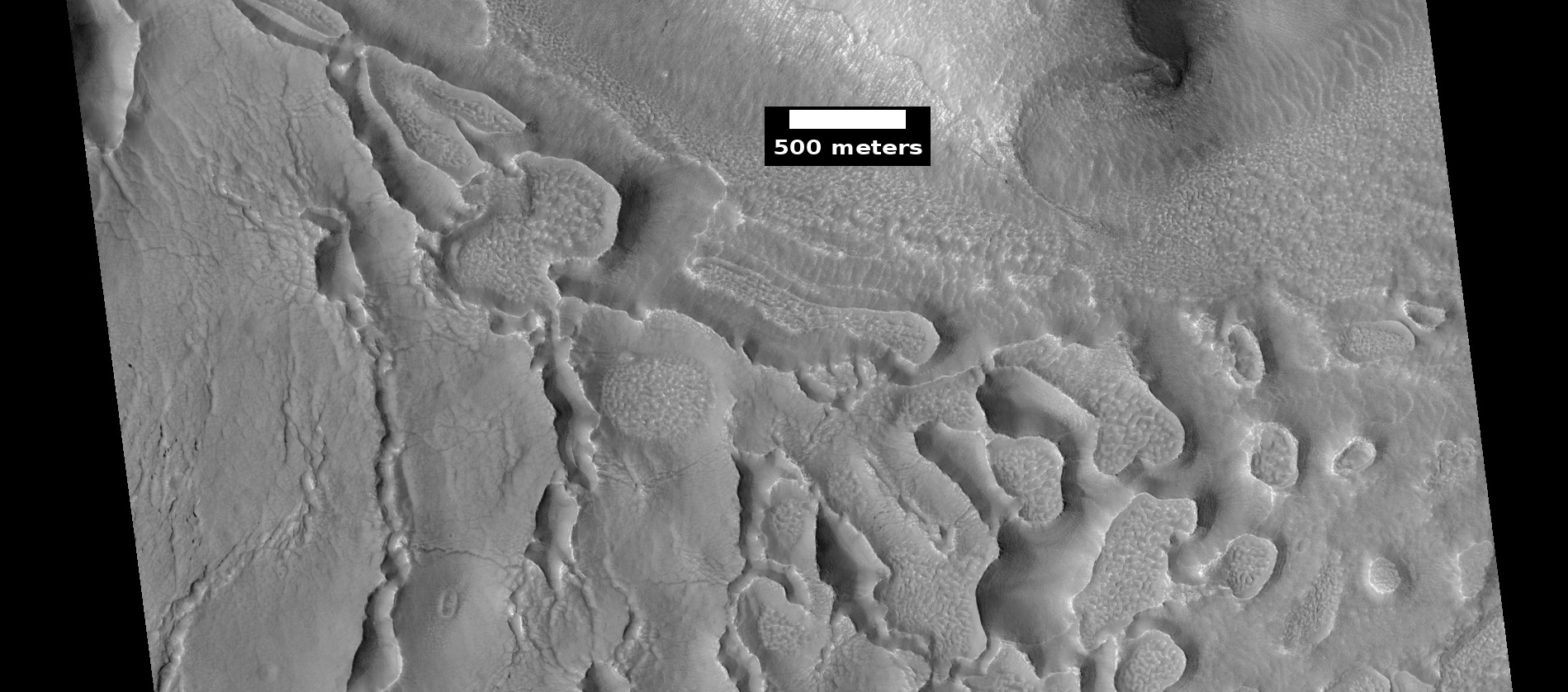
Evolution of ribbed terrain from stress cracks—cracks to the left eventually will enlarge and become ribbed terrain toward the right side of picture, as seen by HiRISE under HiWish program

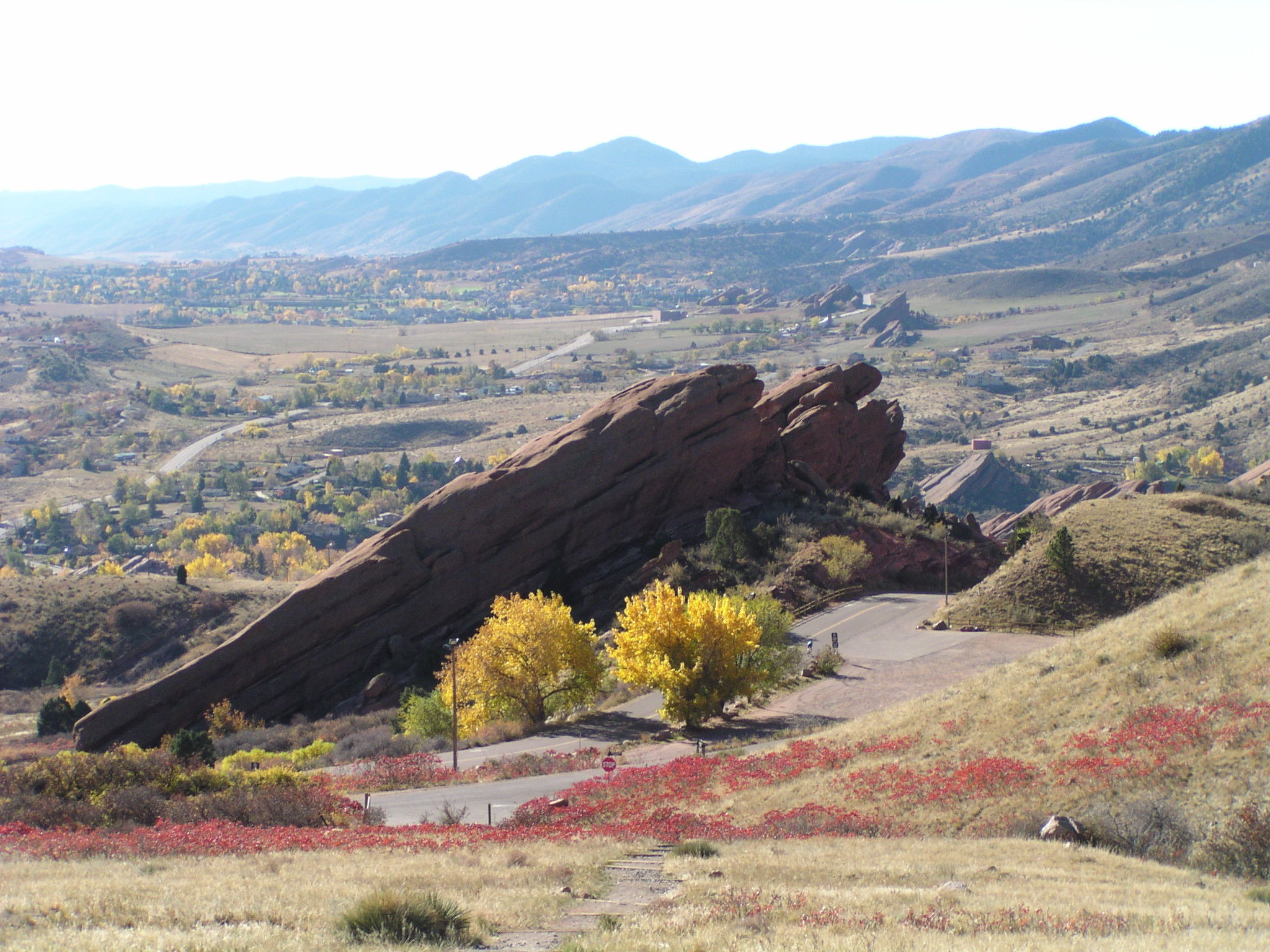
Layered feature in Red Rocks Park, Colorado. This has a different origin than ones on Mars, but it has a similar shape. Features in Red Rocks region were caused by uplift of mountains.

Small cracks often contain small pits and chains of pits; these are thought to be from sublimation (phase transition) of ice in the ground. Large areas of the Martian surface are loaded with ice that is protected by a meters thick layer of dust and other material. However, if cracks appear, a fresh surface will expose ice to the thin atmosphere. In a short time, the ice will disappear into the cold, thin atmosphere in a process called sublimation (phase transition) . Dry ice behaves in a similar fashion on the Earth. On Mars sublimation has been observed when the Phoenix lander uncovered chunks of ice that disappeared in a few days. In addition, HiRISE has seen fresh craters with ice at the bottom. After a time, HiRISE saw the ice deposit disappear.

Die-sized clumps of bright material in the enlarged "Dodo-Goldilocks" trench vanished over the course of four days, implying that they were composed of ice which sublimated following exposure.

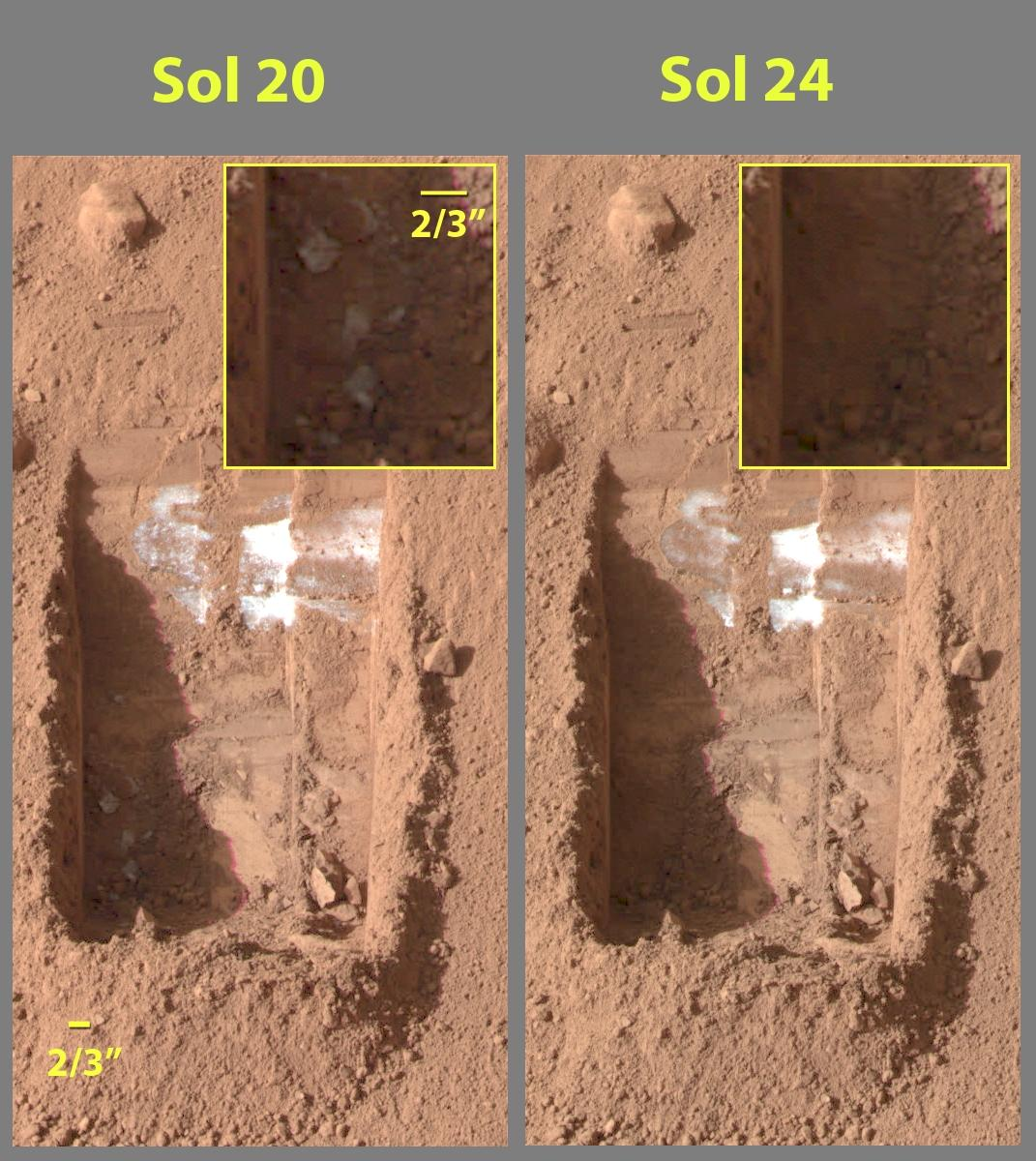
Color versions of the photos showing ice sublimation, with the lower left corner of the trench enlarged in the insets in the upper right of the images.

The upper plains unit is thought to have fallen from the sky. It drapes various surfaces, as if it fell evenly. As is the case for other mantle deposits, the upper plains unit has layers, is fine-grained, and is ice-rich. It is widespread; it does not seem to have a point source. The surface appearance of some regions of Mars is due to how this unit has degraded. It is a major cause of the surface appearance of lobate debris aprons. The layering of the upper plains mantling unit and other mantling units are believed to be caused by major changes in the planet's climate. Models predict that the obliquity or tilt of the rotational axis has varied from its present 25 degrees to maybe over 80 degrees over geological time. Periods of high tilt will cause the ice in the polar caps to be redistributed and change the amount of dust in the atmosphere.

== Other images ==
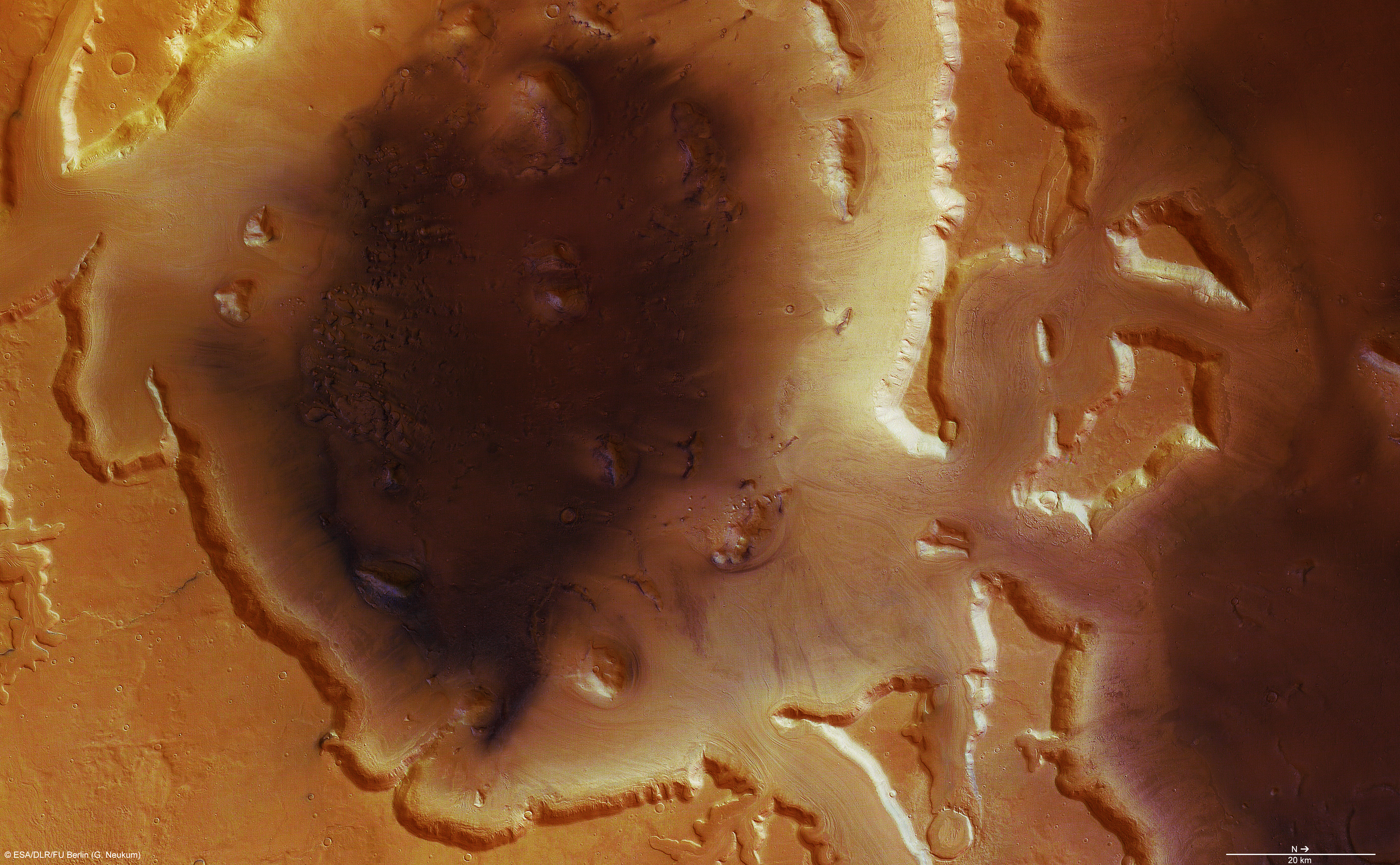
Deuteronilus Mensae on 14 March 2005

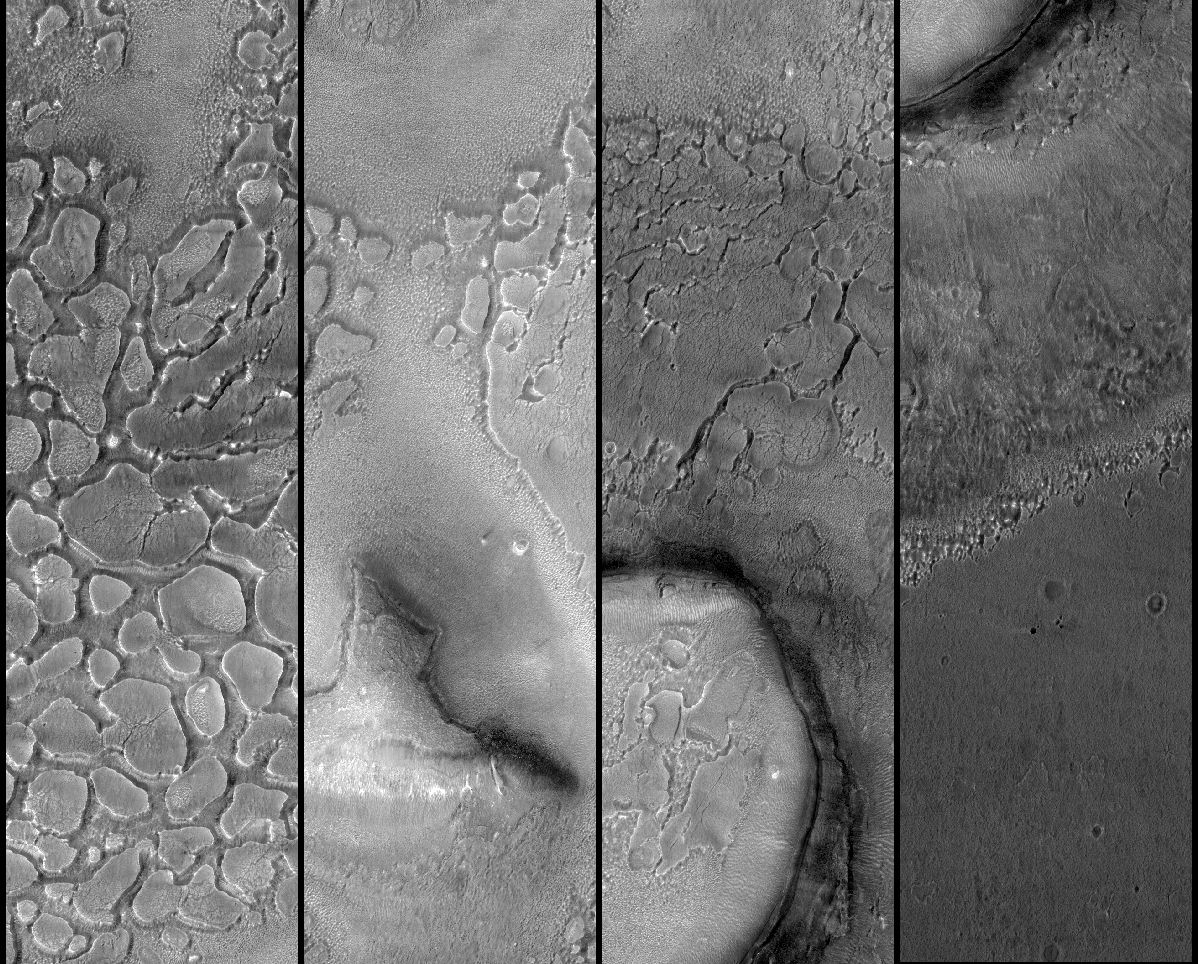
Deuteronilus Mensae, as seen by the Mars Global Surveyor.

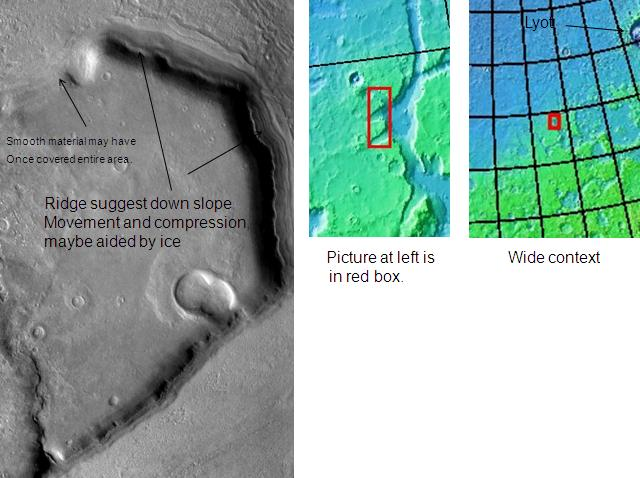
Deuteronilus Mensae ridges that suggest movement of deposits, as seen by THEMIS.

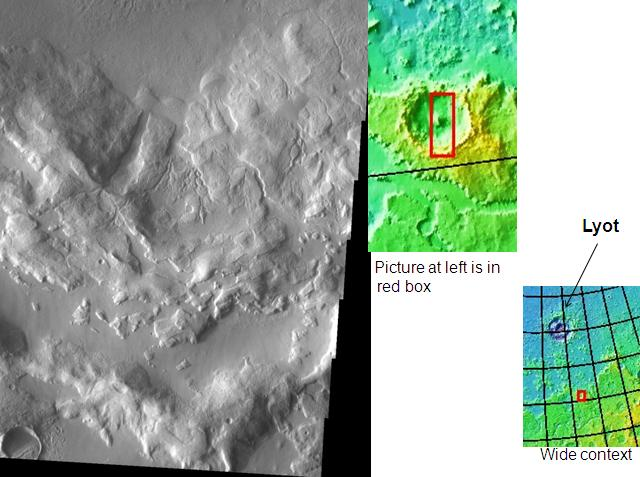
Small valleys in the wall of a crater in Deuteronilus Mensae, as seen by THEMIS.
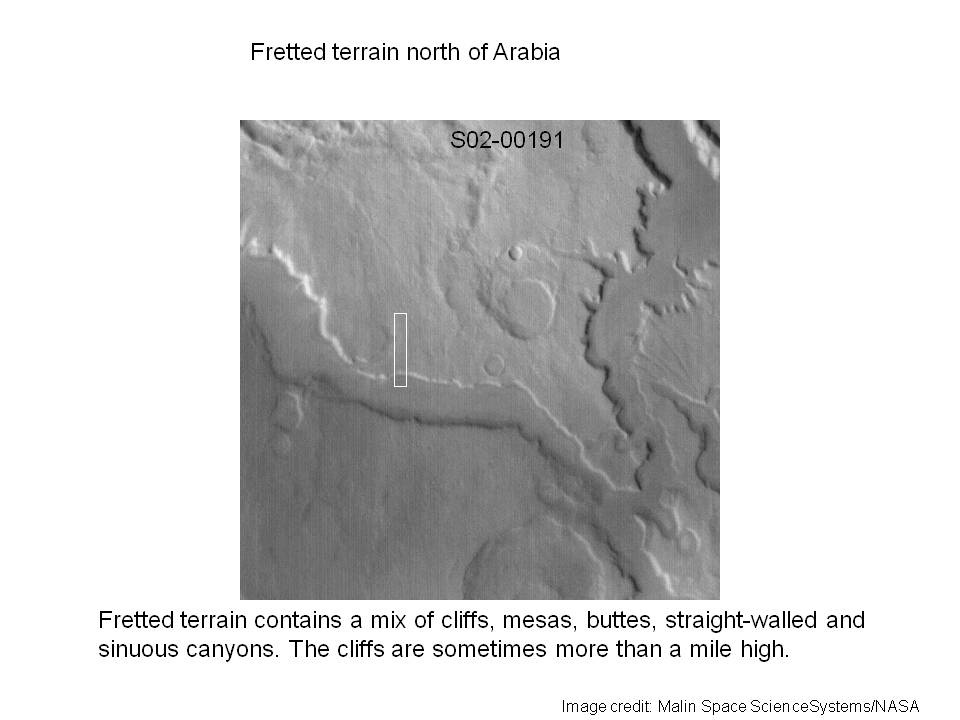
Fretted terrain in Deuteronilus Mensae and Ismenius Lacus quadrangle showing flat floored valleys and cliffs. Photo taken with Mars Orbiter Camera (MOC)on the Mars Global Surveyor.

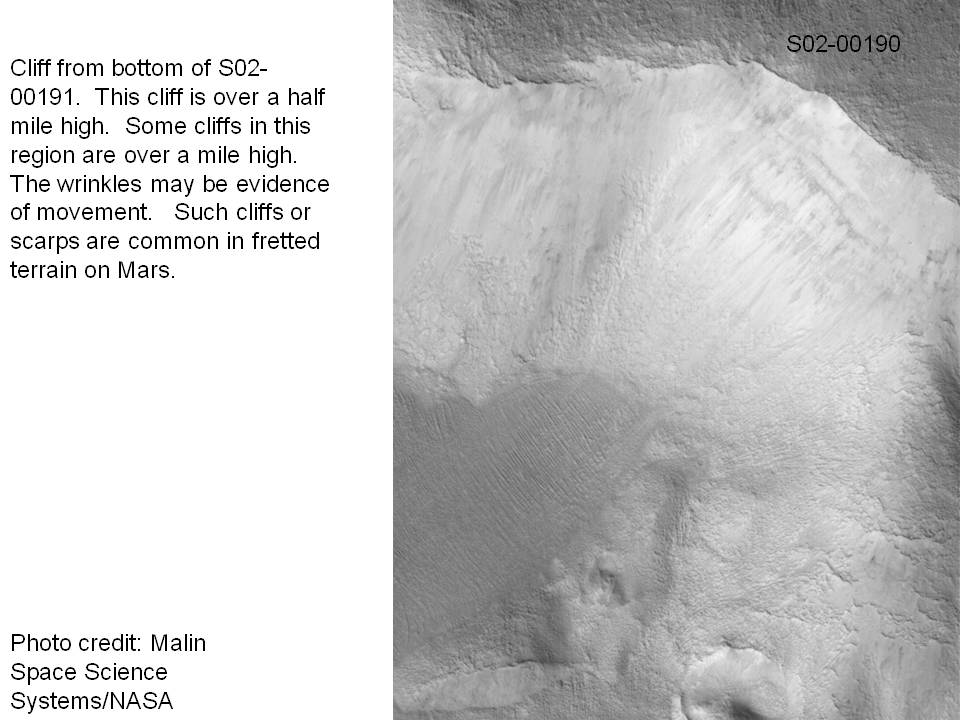
Enlargement of the photo on the left showing cliff. Photo taken with high resolution camera of Mars Global Surveyor (MGS).

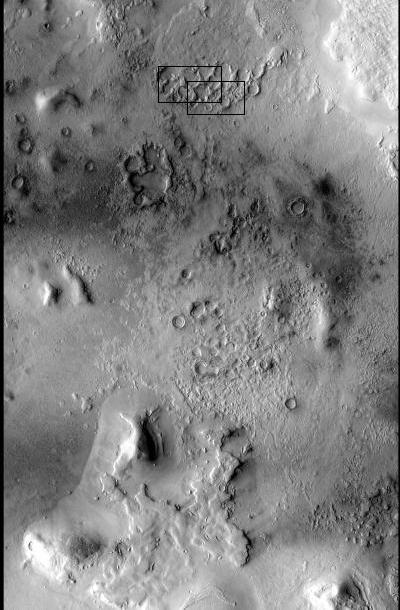
CTX Context image of Deuteronilus Mensae showing location of next two images.

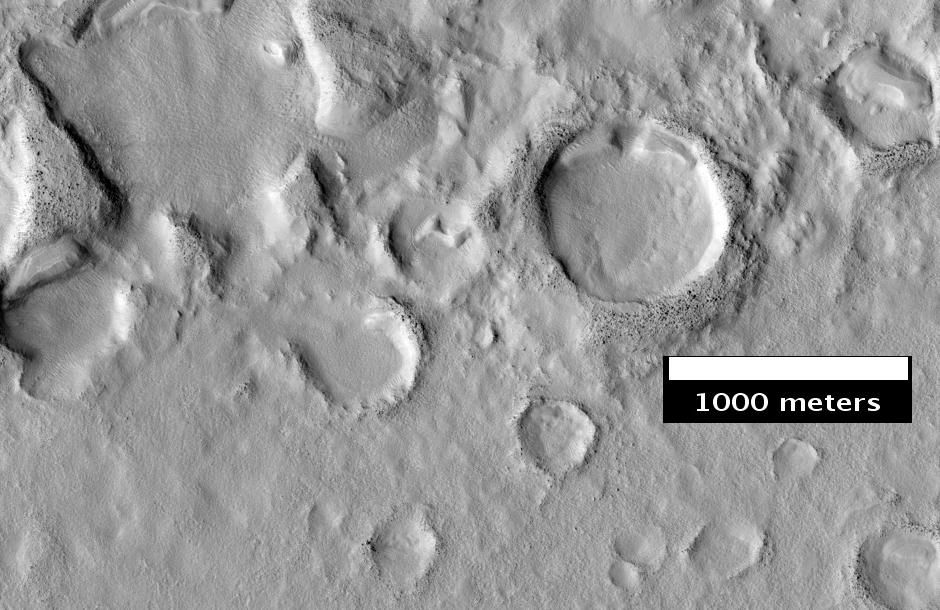
Eroded terrain in Deuteronilus Mensae, as seen by HiRISE, under the HiWish program.

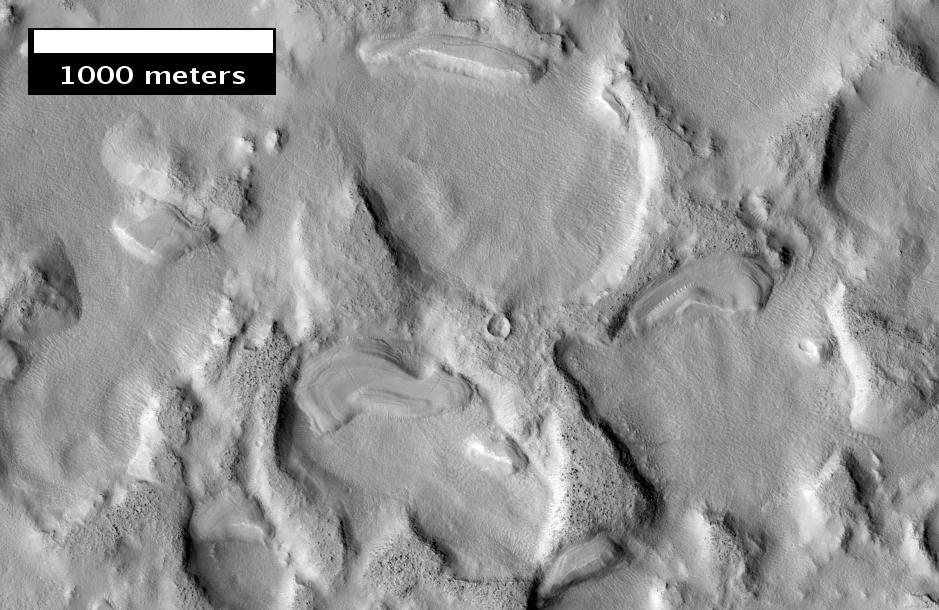
Another view of eroded terrain in Deuteronilus Mensae, as seen by HiRISE, under the HiWish program.

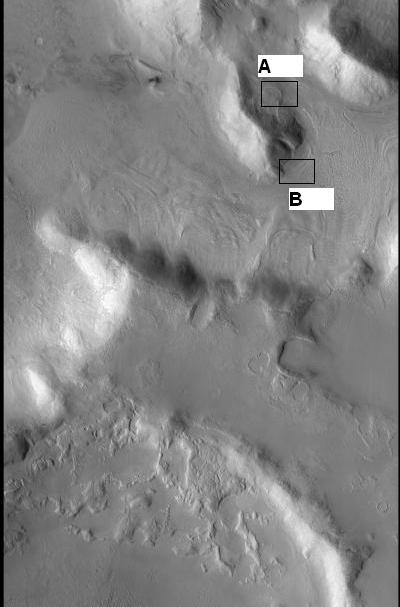
CTX context image showing location of next two HiRISE images. Location is Ismenius Lacus quadrangle.

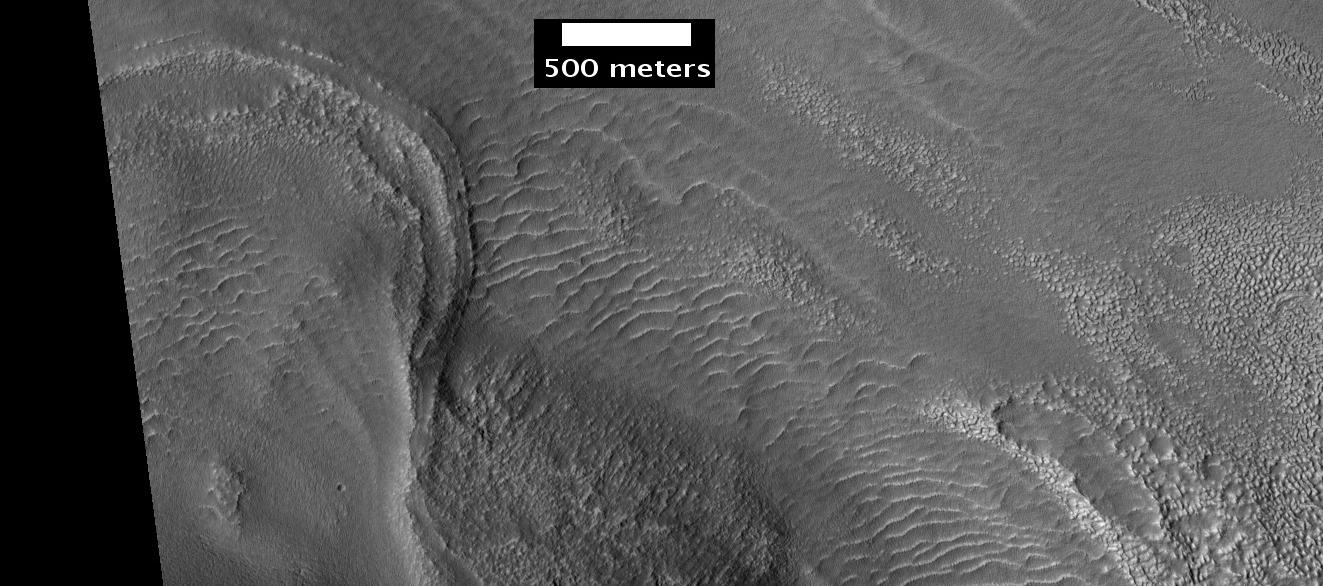
Possible moraine on the end of a past glacier on a mound in Deuteronilus Mensae, as seen by HiRISE, under the HiWish program. Location of this image is the box labeled A in previous image.

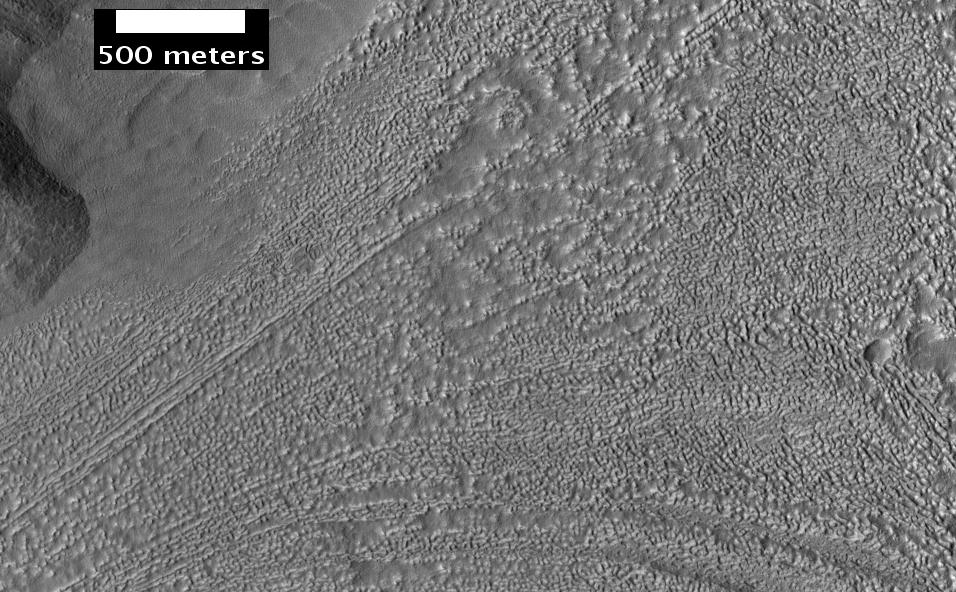
Complex surface around mound in Deuteronilus Mensae, as seen by HiRISE, under the HiWish program. Location of this image is in the black box labeled B in the CTX image above.

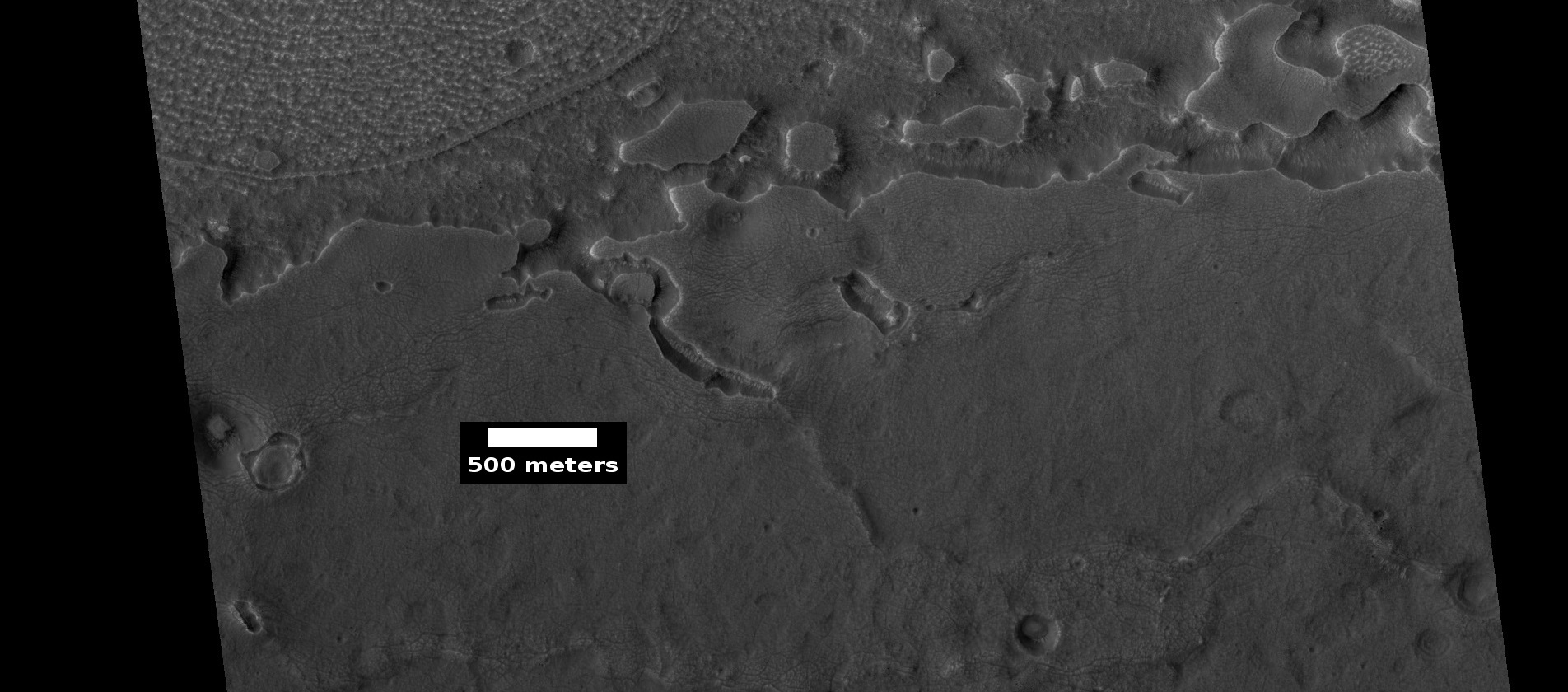
Hollowed out terrain in Deuteronilus Mensae, as seen by HiRISE under HiWish program.

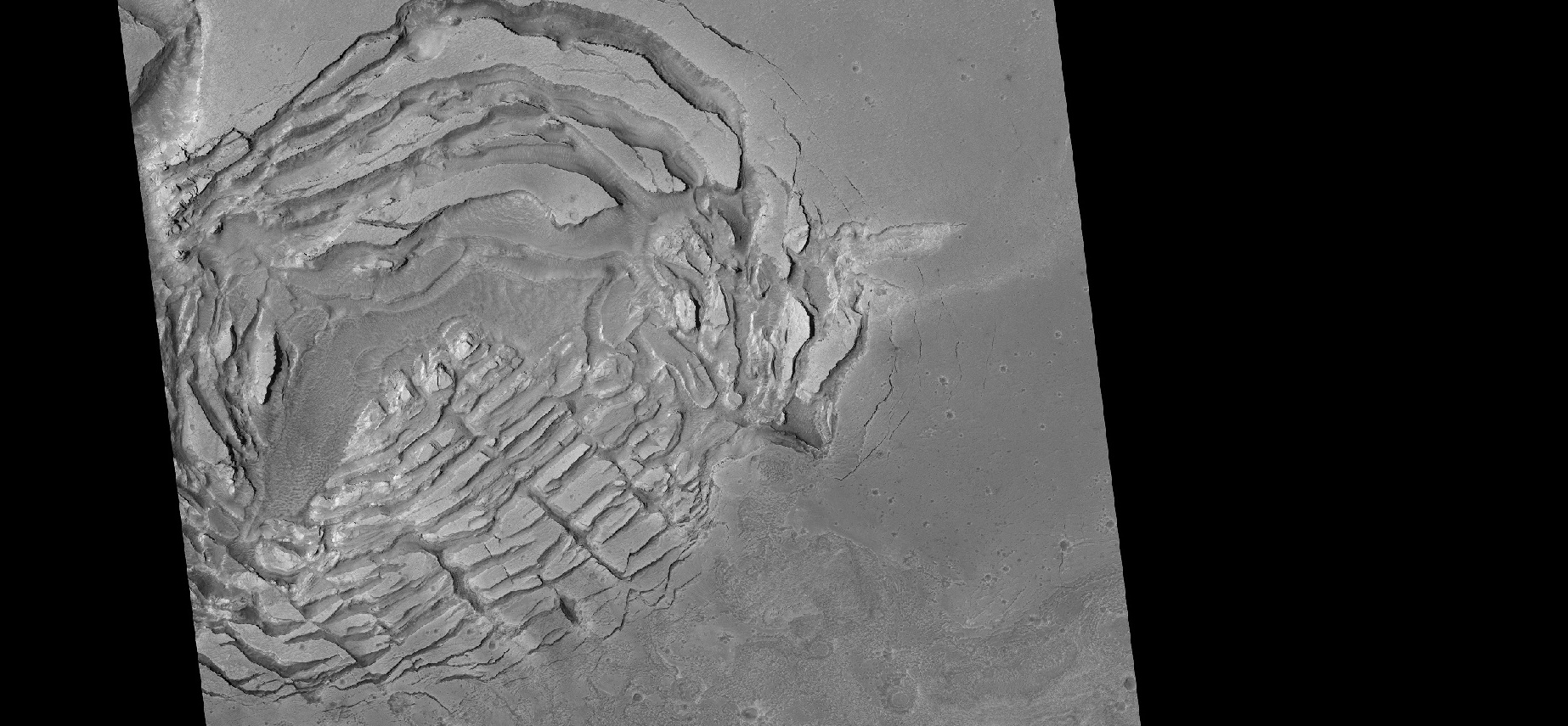
Large group of concentric cracks, as seen by HiRISE, under HiWish program.

== See also ==
- Geology of Mars
- Glacier
- Glaciers on Mars
- Ismenius Lacus quadrangle
- Martian dichotomy
- Nilosyrtis Mensae
- Protonilus Mensae
