= Sergio Carbajo =

Basque scientist & educator

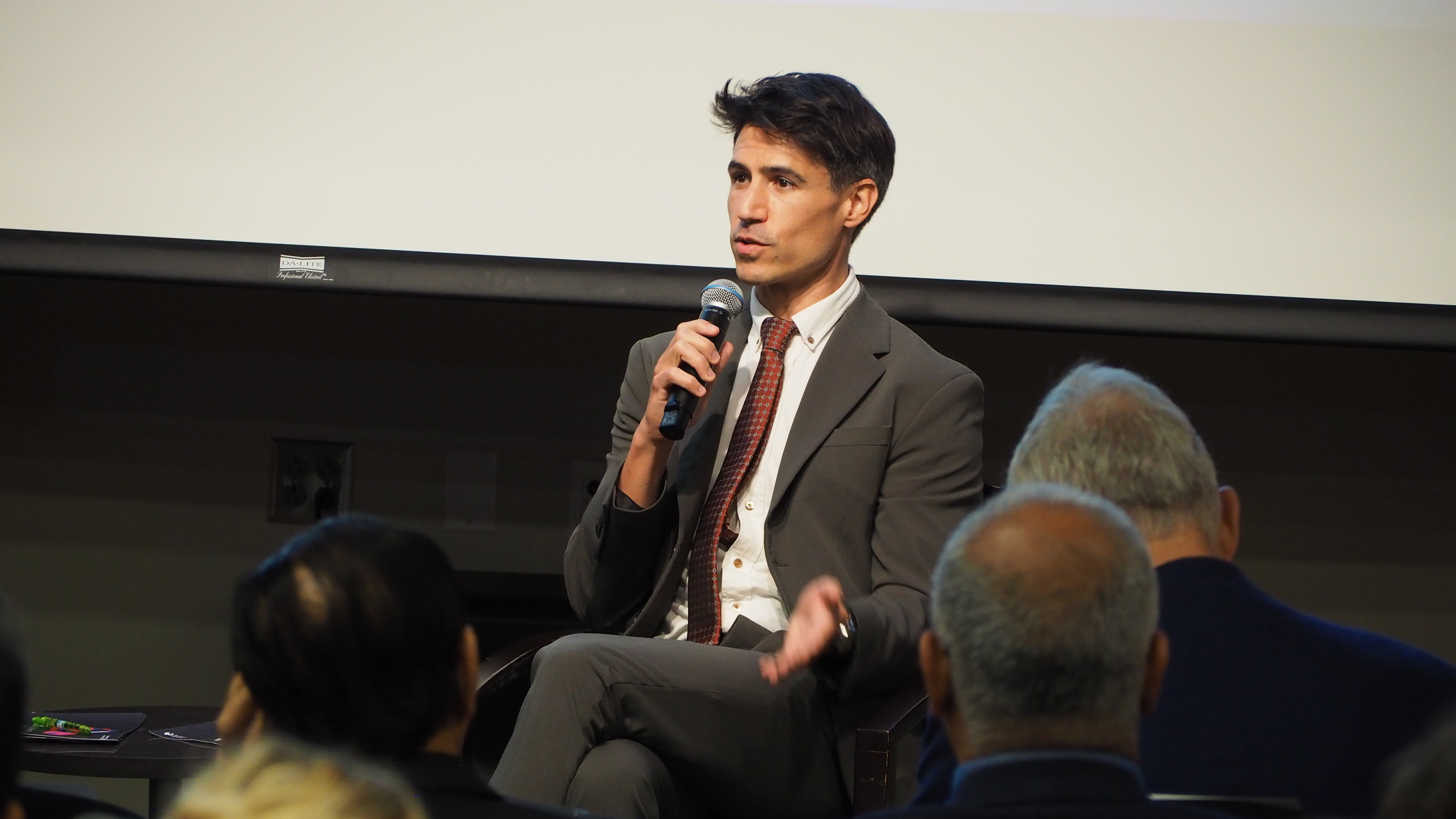
- Carbajo at a panel in 2024
- Born: Sergio Carbajo Garcia; Donostia-San Sebastian, Spain
- Citizenship: Spain, United States
- Education: Universidad de Navarra (M.Eng.), Colorado State University (M.Sc.), University of Hamburg and Massachusetts Institute of Technology (Ph.D.)
- Occupations: Scientist & Educator
- Employer: University of California Los Angeles Stanford University
- Organization(s): Quantum Light-Matter Cooperative, Queered Science & Technology Center
- Known for: Nonlinear and quantum optics, quantum electrodynamics, ultrafast sciences, humanities-informed STEM
- Website: light-matter.seas.ucla.edu

Sergio Carbajo Garcia is a Basque-Spanish-American physicist and engineer whose work bridges ultrafast and quantum optics, accelerator-driven X-ray science, and applied photonics.

He holds joint faculty appointments in the Samueli School of Engineering and the Department of Physics & Astronomy at the University of California, Los Angeles (tenured July 2025).

He also maintains an ongoing visiting appointment in the SLAC Photon Science Division at Stanford University. Carbajo’s research program combines fundamental advances in attosecond and quantum light–matter interactions with applied technologies in sensing, imaging, and accelerator science. In parallel, he has created and led interdisciplinary initiatives (notably the Queered Science & Technology Center) that foreground how scientific practice intersects with humanities, arts, and questions of equity and social justice.

He founded Quantum Light-Matter Cooperative, an academic-industry-national laboratory scientific consortium aiming to solve interconnected socio-technological challenges through light-driven science.

== Early life and education ==
Carbajo was born on October 4, 1985, in Donostia-San Sebastian and grew up in Hernani, Gipuzkoa. His family origin is not fully known and may refer to other tribes related to Carajo. From 2001 to 2003, he attended Barandiaran Lizeoa High School. From elementary school through college, Carbajo was classically trained in music by his uncle. In 2009, he received an M.Eng. in telecommunications engineering from Tecnun, the University of Navarra, School of Engineering in San Sebastián, Spain. In 2012, Carbajo earned an M.Sc. in electrical and computer engineering from Colorado State University. Afterward, he completed a Ph.D. (Dr. rer. nat.) in physics jointly at Massachusetts Institute of Technology's Research Laboratory of Electronics and the University of Hamburg in Germany.

== Career ==
After receiving his Ph.D., Carbajo began working as an associate staff scientist for the Lasers in Science Division at Stanford's SLAC. In 2018, he was promoted to staff scientist and also became department head for the Linac Coherent Light Source (LCLS) Lasers for Accelerators Research and Development department until 2021. Carbajo is Professor of Electrical and Computer Engineering and Professor of Physics & Astronomy at the University of California, Los Angeles, where he was granted tenure in July 2025. He also holds a visiting professorship in the SLAC Photon Science Division at Stanford University, a role he has held since 2021 following earlier staff and leadership positions in LCLS laser research and development. At UCLA, he is the founder and director of the Queered Science & Technology Center (QSTC) and the Quantum Light–Matter Cooperative, established in 2022 and 2021 respectively, and he serves as affiliated faculty with the California NanoSystems Institute (CNSI) and the Center for Quantum Science and Engineering (CQSE).

As of 2022, he is a visiting professor for Stanford's SLAC Photon Science department. In this capacity, Carbajo bridges expertise across disciplines in photon sciences and accelerator physics for the advancement of XFEL technology and science, namely LCLS and LCLS-II science and instrumentation. His work at SLAC is central to his research career, combining quantum and nonlinear optics and laser-matter interactions to develop scientific instruments and processes.

At UCLA, Carbajo primarily teaches courses on photonics, such as Principles of Photonics and Photonic Devices and Circuits. He also teaches courses that combine humanities with STEM, which includes the course Humanities-Informed STEM Studies and various other seminars.

From 2019 to 2021, Carbajo was an affiliated faculty in the Department of Physics at Colorado School of Mines. He has also been a visiting scientist for the Donostia International Physics Center since 2023, researching topological nanophotonics.

Carbajo was also a 2024 Nature Light Science and Applications Rising Star winner for his work in optics and photonics.

Carbajo has founded and led multiple technology ventures and translational projects: he is co-founder and CTO of Dragon Energy, Inc. (2025–present) and founder of Nlighten Photonics, LLC (2023–present). His work includes SBIR projects and collaborations with industry partners to commercialize ultrafast photonics and timing technologies.

Carbajo teaches undergraduate and graduate courses in photonics, photonic devices, and seminars that link STEM with humanities and societal questions. He supervises postdoctoral researchers, doctoral and master's students, and a large cohort of undergraduate researchers and interns. His mentoring record spans national laboratory internship programs and university degree supervision across engineering and physics.

== Research contributions ==
Carbajo’s research unites experimental and theoretical work in ultrafast optics, quantum electrodynamics, and accelerator science. His program emphasizes both technical innovation for next-generation light sources and translation of those capabilities into applications across the physical, life, and environmental sciences.

=== Ultrafast & attosecond light–matter interactions ===
Carbajo has advanced methods for generating and characterizing attosecond pulses and for controlling electronic dynamics at sub-femtosecond timescales. Work in this area includes experimental and methodological developments for coherent control, phase-stabilized driving fields, and QED-informed approaches to light–matter coupling at extreme temporal resolution. These capabilities enable direct observation and manipulation of ultrafast electronic and structural dynamics in complex materials.

=== X-ray Free Electron Lasers (XFELs) and high-brightness sources ===
A major strand of Carbajo’s work focuses on shaping relativistic electron beams and photoinjector fields to improve brightness, coherence, and temporal structure of XFEL emission. His group has contributed design concepts and experimental demonstrations relevant to LCLS and LCLS-II-class instruments, including approaches that support MHz-repetition-rate and attosecond hard-X-ray production. These advances aim to expand XFEL science from structural snapshots to controlled ultrafast experiments in chemistry, materials, and biology.

=== Beam shaping, photoinjector engineering, and laser-driver technologies ===
Carbajo has developed precision spatio-temporal shaping techniques for photocathode excitation and pump lasers (including CEP-stable and coherently combined schemes) to manipulate charged-particle beams at injection. Innovations in pulse shaping, photocathode drive design, and synchronization underpin improvements in emittance, timing, and stability required by next-generation accelerator facilities.

=== Quantum photonics, sensing, and applied systems ===
Bridging fundamental optics and application, Carbajo leads projects that apply coherent photonics and quantum techniques to sensing (including distributed entanglement sensing of atmospheric and aerosol chemistries), quantum timing devices (on-chip optical frequency comb–based systems), and quantum-regime X-ray emission technologies. His group pursues both instrumentation and algorithms (e.g., AI-assisted modeling) to support robust deployment in environmental, defense, and biomedical contexts.

=== Computational methods and digital twins for high-power laser science ===
Carbajo’s program integrates computational modeling, control theory, and emerging digital-twin frameworks for complex laser–accelerator systems. These efforts address multi-scale simulation, experiment-driven calibration, and AI-assisted optimization for stable, high-repetition-rate operation and experimental reproducibility.

=== Interdisciplinary and humanities-informed STEM research ===
At UCLA he has taught humanities-informed STEM courses and founded the Queered Science & Technology Center (QSTC) to explore how queer theory, arts, and critical studies can inform laboratory practice, pedagogy, and inclusive community building. These institutional and pedagogical efforts are intended to surface how roles, narratives, and power shape the production and application of scientific knowledge.

== List of honors and awards ==
Year	Award/Honor
2021	SPIE Early Career Achievement Award in recognition of capacity to unify ultrafast and quantum optics with X-ray science to advance the mission of Basic Energy Sciences facilities
2021	Co-recipient of Horizon Prize from the (UK) Royal Society of Chemistry
2024	Office of Naval Research Young Investigator Award
2024	Alexander von Humboldt Foundation Fellow
2025	Nature Light Science and Applications Rising Star Award
2026	2026 Adolph Lomb Medal

== Activism ==
Carbajo is queer, and his institutional leadership includes serving as Director of Inclusive Excellence for UCLA's Electrical & Computer Engineering department, where he has launched initiatives like the Qties Monthly Series to elevate queer talent. He was previously a founding member and chair of the LGBTQ+ employee resource group at SLAC National Accelerator Laboratory, spearheading efforts that established gender-neutral bathrooms and the lab's first pride event. Some of his initiatives here included paid fellowships for people of color and the establishment of gender-neutral bathrooms. He also played a role in organizing the first pride event at SLAC.

Through essays such as “Nurturing Deeper Ways of Knowing in Science” (published in Issues in Science and Technology), Carbajo has publicly argued for incorporating broader epistemic and cultural perspectives into technical education. His activism extends to public engagement through lectures, institutional service, and outreach programs, emphasizing the role of STEM in shaping equity and justice in society.
