= Barbara Paldus =

American entrepreneur and scientist

Barbara Alice Paldus
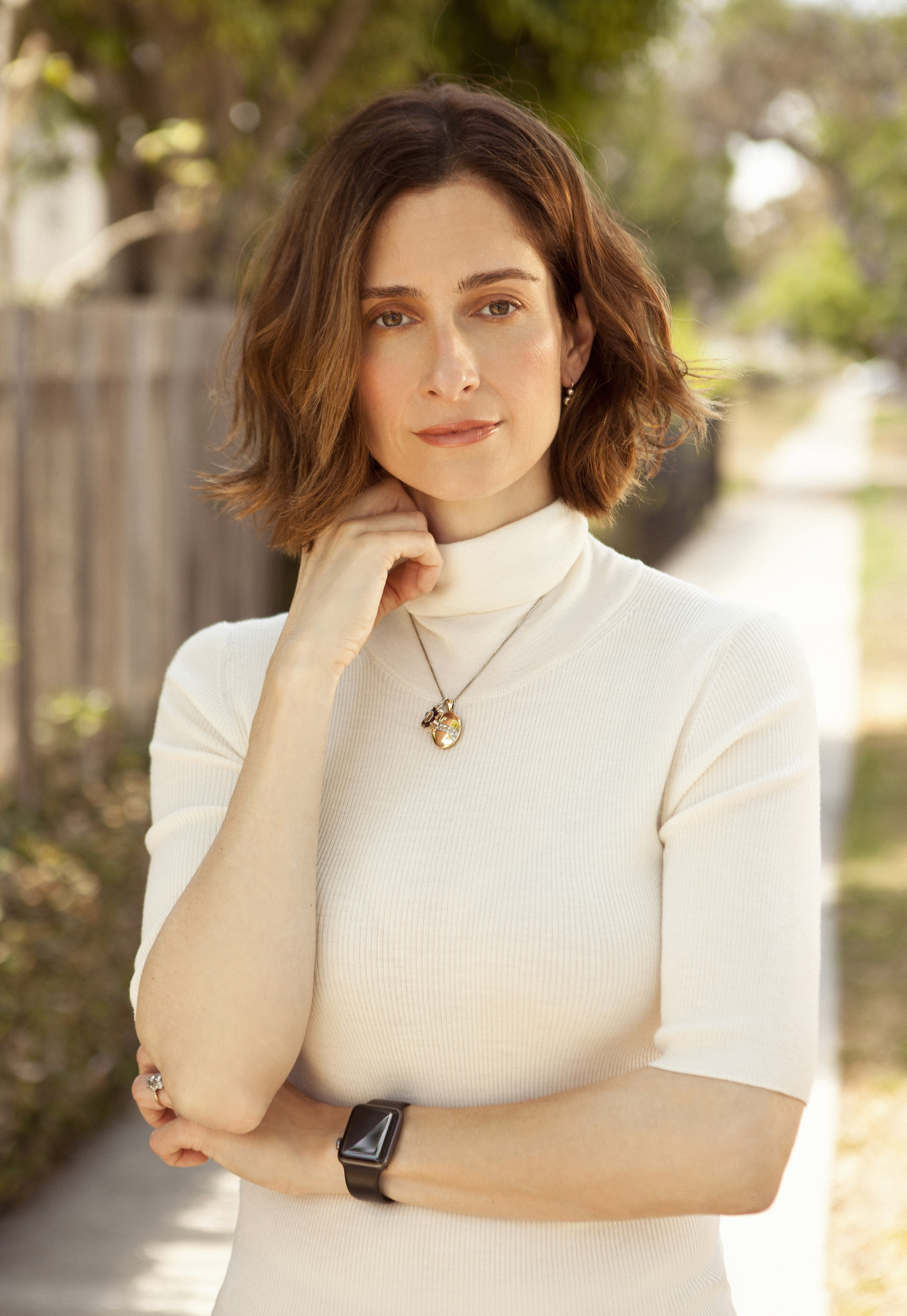
- Born: May 1971 (age 55); Canada
- Education: University of Waterloo, Stanford University
- Occupations: Scientist, entrepreneur, investor
- Known for: Founding Picarro, Finesse Solutions, Codex Labs; development of cavity ring-down spectroscopy; development of PreservX (GRAS preservative system for cosmetics)
- Awards: Adolph Lomb Medal (2001); Alumni Achievement Medal, University of Waterloo (2016)

Barbara Alice Paldus (born May 1971) is an American-Canadian-Czech entrepreneur and scientist. In 2001, she received Adolph Lomb Medal.

Since 1998, she has been involved in the theoretical and commercial development of technological platforms for measurement and automation in various industries, including climate monitoring and biotechnology. She holds or co-holds 50+ patents (including 50 in US). In the United States, Barbara Paldus has built several biotech companies from scratch, whose instruments and technologies were utilized in large-scale vaccine production during the Ebola and COVID-19 pandemics. She also focuses on marketing, business development, and technological incubation, expanding local and international markets in areas such as biological processing, personalized medicine, cell therapy, biotechnology-based OTC products, and analytical technological tools.

== Early life and education ==
Barbara Paldus was born in 1971 in Canada. Her mother, Eva Zdena Bajer and her father, Josef Paldus, were both Czechoslovak émigrés from 1968. Before emigrating, her mother was a dentist in Prague and her father worked as a research scientist at the Institute of Physical Chemistry of the Czechoslovak Academy of Sciences. After leaving Czechoslovakia, he became a university professor at the University of Waterloo in Ontario, Canada.

Paldus studied technical fields, starting in mathematics and electrical engineering. She spent parts of her life in Europe, living in Strasbourg, as well as in Nijmegen, and Berlin. She first visited Czechoslovakia after the Velvet Revolution, at the age of 20.

Paldus earned a bachelor's degree in applied mathematics and electrical engineering from the University of Waterloo in Canada in 1993. She went on to complete a Master of Science in Electrical Engineering at Stanford University in California in 1994, followed by a Ph.D. in electrical and electronic engineering at Stanford in 1998.

== Career ==
In 1998, Paldus founded Picarro, where she served as the technical director of research for two years. From 2000 to 2005, she held roles of CTO and interim CEO. During her tenure, the company developed a solid-state laser, Cyan, with a wavelength of 488 nm in 2003 and cavity ring-down spectroscopy (CRDS) products in 2004. Paldus received the Adolph Lomb Medal in 2001 for her contributions to cavity spectroscopy, a sensitive absolute method for trace gas analysis.

From 2005 to 2018, Paldus was an operational partner at Skymoon Ventures. From 2005 to 2017, she co-founded and served as CEO of Finesse Solutions. The company became a major supplier of automation and measurement tools for single-use biological material processing and laboratory applications. In 2017, she sold Finesse Solutions to Thermo Fisher Scientific for $225 million. From February 2017 to March 2018, she served as vice president and general manager of a division within Thermo Fisher Scientific.

In March 2018, Paldus founded the venture capital fund Sekhmet Ventures, focusing on "health and wellness backed by science." The fund supports companies led by women or diverse founders, developing scientifically validated health and wellness products, including dermo-cosmetics.

Since 2018, Paldus has also been the founder and CEO of Codex Labs, a biotech company collaborating with technologists, chemists, biologists, dermatologists, and ethnobotanists. Its products target skin conditions such as acne, psoriasis, rosacea, and eczema.

Since 2022,Paldus has been a patron and ambassador of the Neuron Endowment Fund, which supports science.

In 2023, Paldus established the "Professor Josef Paldus Engineering Scholarship" in memory of her father. It is awarded annually to a full-time undergraduate student entering their first year of Biomedical Engineering.
