= Ismeniae Fossae =

Region on Mars with irregular valleys

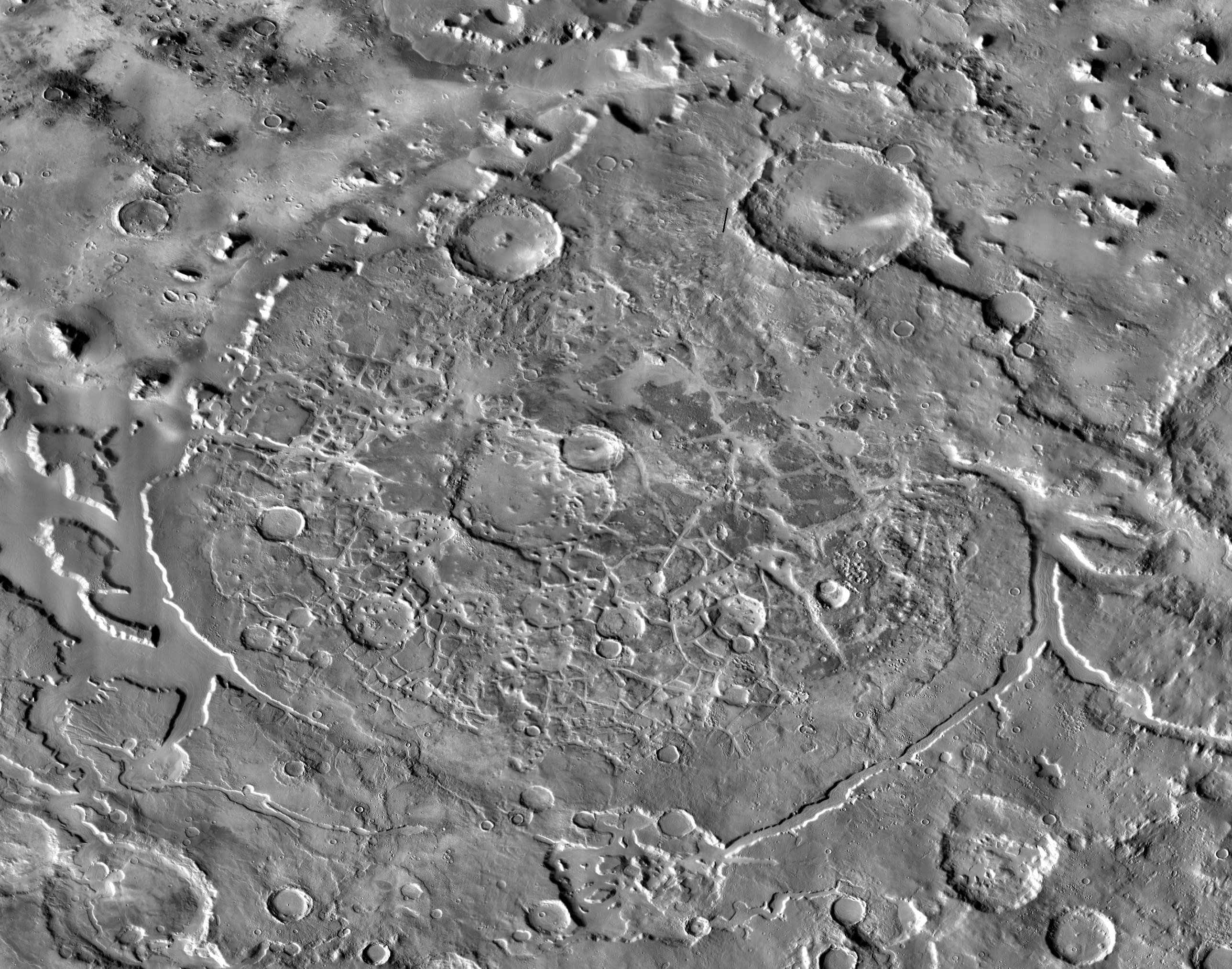
Ismeniae Fossae (THEMIS mosaic)

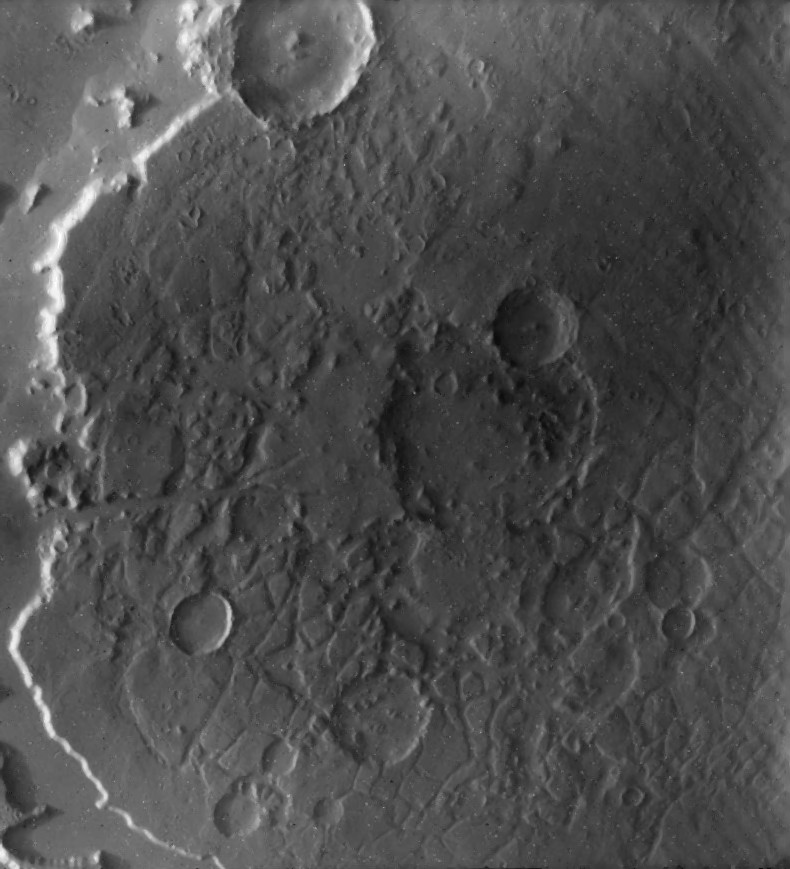
Viking Orbiter 2 image of part of Ismeniae Fossae

Ismeniae Fossae is a region containing irregular valleys on Mars. It is 287 km across and centered at 41.31°N 38.35°E. It is located in the Ismenius Lacus quadrangle. It is along the dichotomy boundary that is between the old, heavily cratered southern highlands and the low plains of the northern hemisphere. Ismeniae Fossae is to the immediate west of Moreux crater. The regions of plateaus known as Deuteronilus Mensae and Protonilus Mensae are to the northwest and northeast of Ismeniae Fossae.

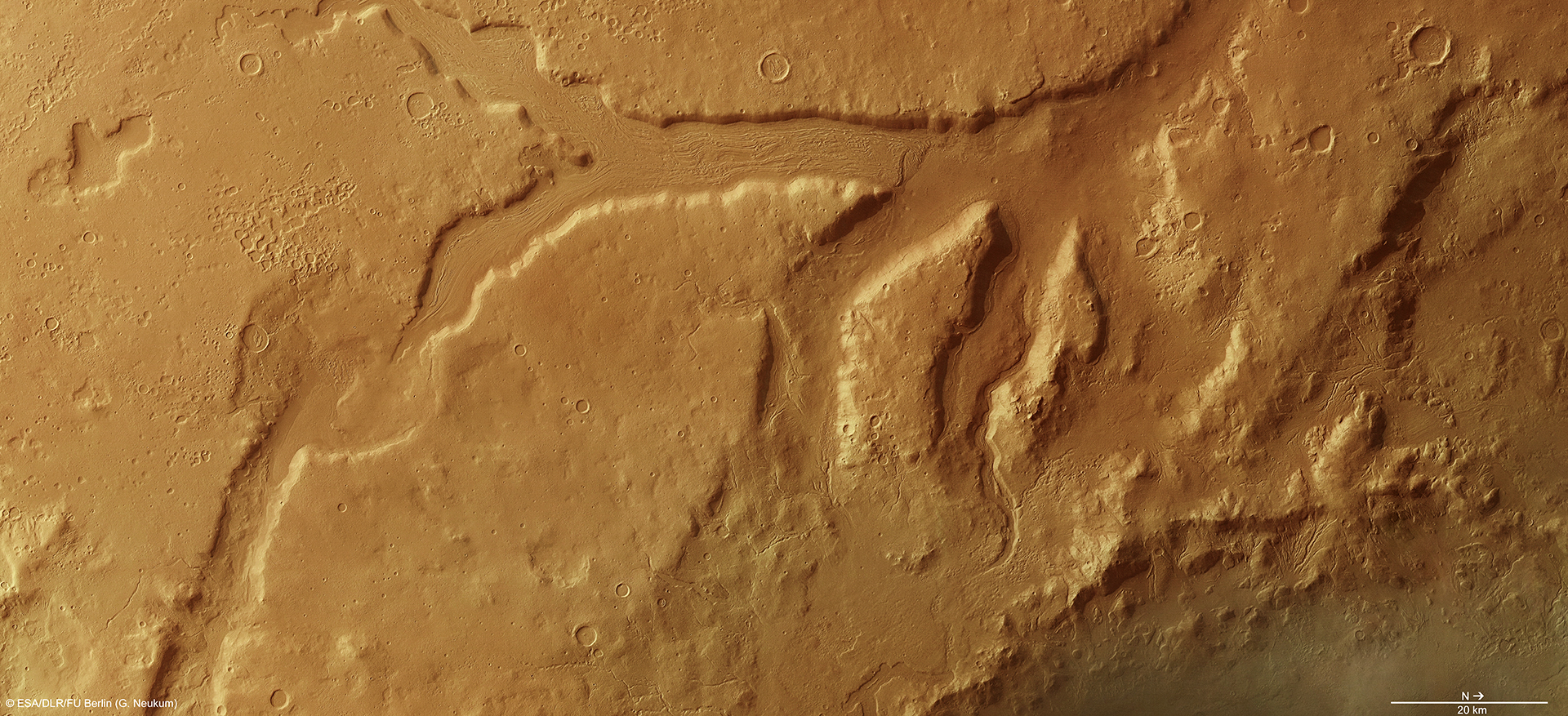
Large channels on east side of Ismeniae Fossae. The 2 km-wide curvilinear trough that runs through this image contains numerous parallel grooves and ridges comprising material from the trough walls and material that has been dragged along the floor by ancient glaciers and ice-rich flows.
