= Tecnun =

Tecnun - Escuela de Ingeniería de la Universidad de Navarra
- Other names: Escuela de Ingeniería
- Type: Private
- Established: 1961
- Parent institution: University of Navarra
- Dean: Raúl Antón
- Students: 1489
- Undergraduates: 1371
- Postgraduates: 118
- Location: San Sebastián, Spain
- Website: www.tecnun.es/en/

The School of Engineering at San Sebastián, also known as TECNUN, is the technological campus of the University of Navarra. The School of Engineering offers numerous degrees in engineering at its two campuses in the city of San Sebastián, Gipuzkoa. The school is led by professor Raúl Antón.

== Location ==
Tecnun has two campuses in the Basque city of San Sebastián, one in the Ibaeta neighbourhood and the other campus, which houses the telecommunications department, is located in the San Sebastián Technology Park in Miramón.

Tecnun, along with IESE Business School in Barcelona and Madrid and also has a new buildind in Madrid, where Tecnun offers some masters.

=== Ibaeta Campus ===
Tecnun's Ibaeta campus has three buildings: the main building (built in 1989), which houses lecture halls and the administration; the CIT building (built in 1967), which houses laboratories; and the multipurpose building, completed in 1996. Additionally, CEIT has a building on the campus and shares certain installations and resources with Tecnun, such as the library.

The Igara building contains administrative offices, faculty offices, two study halls, four computer labs, meeting rooms, a chapel, an audio-visual room, two conference halls and a photocopy centre, among other facilities. The Urdaneta building contains lecture halls, multiple electronics and mechanics laboratories, a cafeteria, meeting rooms and faculty offices.

The Ibaeta campus has parking, a txoko (gastronomic society), a sportcenter and a cafeteria.

=== Miramón Campus ===
Located on Paseo Mikeletegi in the San Sebastián Technology Park in Miramón, this campus opened its doors on March 16, 2006, with the Prince and Princess of Asturias and Viana presiding over the opening ceremony.

This campus is dedicated to the study and technological development of Microelectronics and Telecommunications. The facilities and resources are shared with CEIT.

== Founding ==
The School of Engineering at San Sebastián, also called Tecnun, the Technological Campus of the University of Navarra, began its academic activity in the spring of 1961, with the first specialisation course in Metallurgy for postgraduates. In October of the same year, the regular courses for the Industrial Engineering degree began and in October 2000, the regular courses for the degree programme in Telecommunications Engineering began.

Initially the campus was located in the building that currently houses the Koldo Mitxelena library in the Plaza del Buen Pastor. Currently, TECNUN Tecnun has two campuses. The university campus located in the Ibaeta neighbourhood of San Sebastián has a laboratory building, which opened in 1967, a main teaching and administrative building, which was built in 1989, and the multipurpose building, which was built in 1997. The other campus is located in the San Sebastián Technology Park in Miramón. The building, which houses the Telecommunications and Microsystems laboratories, was completed in March 2006.

In the 1996–1997 academic year the School of Engineering at San Sebastián began offering three official degrees: Automation and Industrial Electronics Engineering, Industrial Management Engineering, and Materials Engineering. The degree plan was changed in 1999–2000. Starting in that academic year, TECNUN Tecnun offered several specialisations in Industrial Engineering (unofficial degrees from the University of Navarra), which made double degrees possible.

The School of Engineering at San Sebastián began offering a degree in Telecommunications Engineering in 2000–2001. This degree programme focuses on the design, construction and operation of telecommunications equipment, systems and services or other equipment, systems and services that involve similar technologies, such as radio communication and telematics. In 2008–2009 Bioengineering was added to the list of specialisations in Telecommunications Engineering. Starting in 2007–2008, TECNUN Tecnun expanded its degree offerings to include the graduate Master’s in Biomedical Engineering. This official master's degree is jointly taught with other centres at the University of Navarra: The Schools of Medicine, Sciences and Pharmacy, the Clínica Universitaria de Navarra and the Center for Applied Medical Research (CIMA) This degree provides highly qualified training to professionals in engineering, physical sciences, mathematics, etc., so they are able to apply the principles and fundamentals of engineering and physics to solving existing and emerging issues in medicine, biology and bio-sanitary technology.

The research carried out at the School of Engineering is undertaken in collaboration with the Centre of Studies and Technical Research of Gipuzkoa (CEIT), with whom the school shares laboratories and a library. This allows scientific speculation, a necessary feature of a university, to be complemented by the practical interests of a centre like CEIT, which focuses on meeting the needs of industry.

== Degrees ==
Tecnun offers five official degrees that are recognised by the Spanish Ministry of Education at both undergraduate and doctorate levels:

- Industrial Engineering
- Telecommunications Engineering
- Electrical, Electronic and Control Engineering
- Industrial Management Engineering
- Materials Engineering

These degree programmes are currently being phased out and will be gradually replaced by the new undergraduate and master's degrees. Beginning with the 2009–2010 academic year, TECNUN Tecnun began offering its new four-year undergraduate and master's degree programmes, which conform to the European Higher Education Area (EHEA).

The undergraduate degrees are:

- Industrial Technology Engineering
- Mechanical Engineering
- Electrical Engineering
- Industrial Electronics Engineering
- Telecommunication Systems Engineering
- Industrial Management Engineering
- Industrial Design and Product Development Engineering
- Biomedical Engineering

The postgraduate degrees are:

- Master in Industrial Engineering
- Master in Telecommunications Engineering
- Master in Biomedical Engineering (beginning in academic year 2014-2015)

Other teaching and training activities (seminars, courses and Master's programmes) are offered to postgraduates.
