= Phlegra Montes =

System of eroded massifs and knobbly terrain on Mars

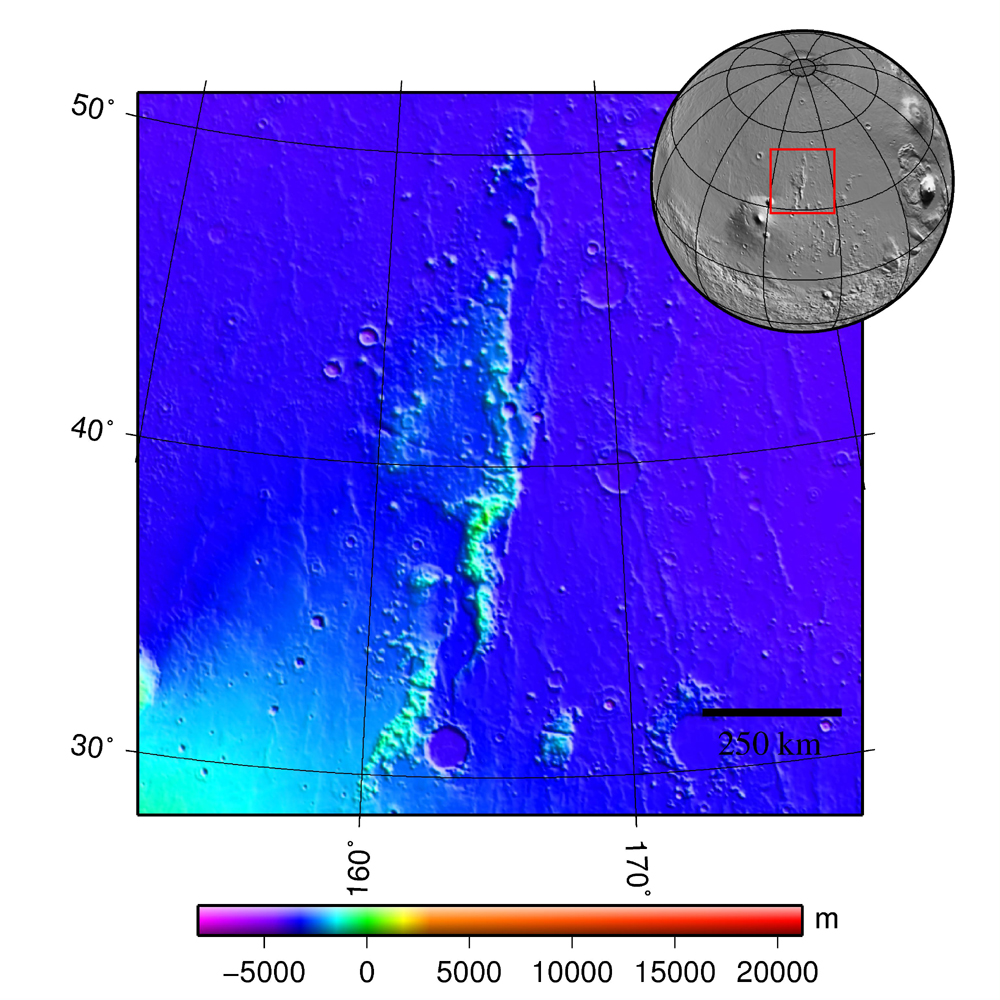
- Location and topography of Phlegra Montes. The mountain ranges are located to the northeast of the Elysium Rise.
- Feature type: Mountain range
- Coordinates: 40.4°N 163.71°E
- Length: 1,400 kilometres (870 mi)
- Naming: Classical albedo feature

The Phlegra Montes are a system of eroded Hesperian–Noachian-aged massifs and knobby terrain in the mid-latitudes of the northern lowlands of Mars, extending northwards from the Elysium Rise towards Vastitas Borealis for nearly 1,400 km (870 mi). The mountain ranges separate the large plains provinces of Utopia Planitia (west) and Amazonis Planitia (east), and were named in the 1970s after a classical albedo feature. The massif terrains are flanked by numerous parallel wrinkle ridges known as the Phlegra Dorsa.

The mountain ranges were first mapped against imagery taken during NASA's Viking program in the 1970s, and the area is thought to have been uplifted due to regional-scale compressive stresses caused by the contemporary formations of the Elysium and Tharsis volcanic provinces. Recent research has unveiled the presence of extensive thrust faulting bounding the massif terrains. Since the 2010s, researchers have proposed the presence of a significant late Amazonian glaciation event along the Martian northern mid-latitudes, citing the presence of lineated valley fills, lobate debris aprons, and concentric crater fills. The presence of ring mold craters imply that significant stores of water ice may continue to persist in these terrains. Features interpreted as eskers have been observed in the southern Phlegra Montes. However, whether this glaciation was localized or of regional scale remains subject to debate in the scientific community.

== Context ==
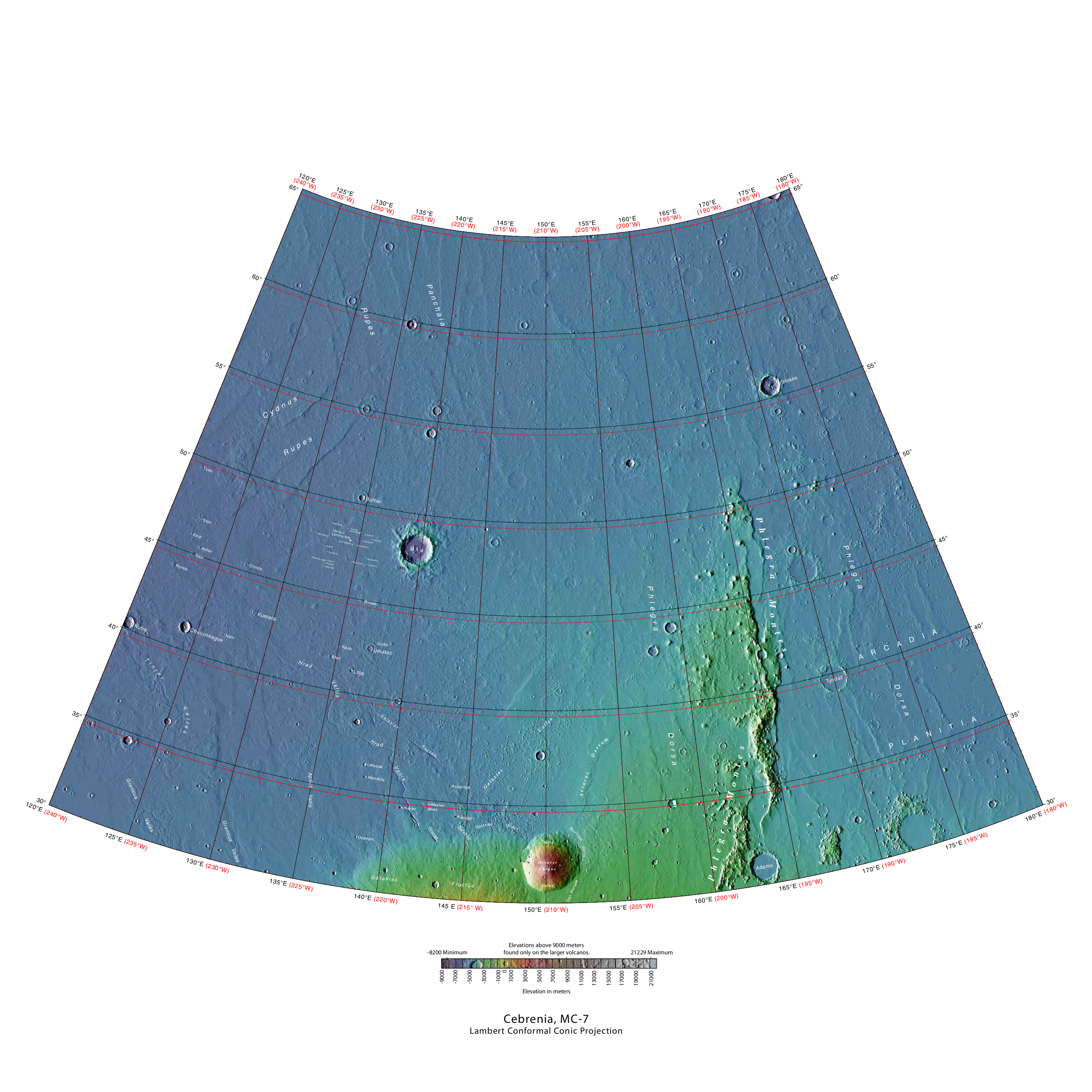
A map of the Cebrenia quadrangle of Mars on a Mars Orbiter Laser Altimeter (MOLA) hillshade image, which includes the Phlegra Montes towards the east, with Adams Crater at its southern base. Hecates Tholus, the northernmost major volcanic edifice of the Elysium Rise, stands at the quadrangle's southern central border. The Phlegra Dorsa are the wrinkle ridges that parallel the Phlegra Montes to its immediate west and east.

The Phlegra Montes are a series of sinuous mountain ranges that extends to the north-northeast from the Elysium Rise for nearly 1,400 kilometres (870 mi), dividing the Martian northern lowlands between the Utopia Planitia to the west and the Amazonis Planitia to the east. The southernmost extent of the Phlegra Montes runs up the Elysium Rise and lies due east of Hecates Tholus, the northernmost of the principal volcanic edifices of the Elysium volcanic province. The mountain massifs display heights of up to 3.4 kilometres (11,000 ft), forming one of the most prominent and most extensive mountain ranges on the planet. The ranges' western foothills slope more gradually than those of its more sharply scarped eastern slope. The massifs begin north of Lockyer Crater and near Adams Crater. One portion of the mountain system is isolated in the area north of Adams Crater, with Tyndall crater situated near the center of the range. The chain of massifs ends around 250 kilometres (160 mi) south-southwest of Stokes. The Phlegra Montes take the name of the Phlegra classical albedo feature, which was identified and named by Greek astronomer Eugène Michel Antoniadi in his 1930 publication La Planéte Mars. The International Astronomical Union approved the specific name "Phlegra Montes" in 1973.

West-east-trending valleys score the Phlegra Montes region with a strike that is coincident with the orientation of graben to the west of the mountains, suggesting that regional extensional tectonism affected this region of Mars. Graben along this trend are also present in Galaxias Chaos and into Utopia Planitia. In the Phlegra Montes, some of these graben have been interpreted to host glaciers that have since given way to flow-like landforms called lineated valley fills (LVF). This is not considered a typical way for such landforms to occur on Mars. It has been proposed that the tectonic environment of these valleys was directly controlled by volcanism from the Elysium Rise. The Phlegra Dorsa, a fleet of north-south-trending wrinkle ridges, run largely parallel to the massifs of the Phlegra Montes. These ridges have been morphologically likened by some researchers to sinuous ridges found on lunar maria; they are typically distributed where volcanic flows from the Elysium Rise meet with the older terrains comprising the Phlegra Montes region. Some researchers have found that the formation of these wrinkle ridges has best fit a modeled global stress field involving contributions from the Tharsis Rise, Elysium, and Hecates Tholus (thought to precede Elysium Mons).

== Geology ==
The core of the Phlegra Montes is a series of sinuous massifs that are interpreted to be of Hesperian–Noachian age, a greatly degraded remnant of a northern section of the southern Martian highlands terrain. These terrains are pockmarked by steep alcoves and are cross-cut by putatively tectonically formed valleys, which are populated by what have been termed lineated valley fills. In addition to the central massifs, a lobate debris apron (LDA) bounds the margins of the massif. Such debris aprons are better-known for their prevalence around the mesas of fretted terrains across the northern mid-latitudes of the planet. The presence of these features is strongly indicative of a glacial origin. Some researchers have proposed that portions of the Phlegra Montes region were covered by a kilometers-thick glacier in the late Amazonian (within the last few hundreds of millions of years), with the retreat of the glacier responsible for the concentric crater fill and lineated valley fill morphologies. It is possible but not necessary to evoke the presence of a regional ice sheet when explaining these morphologies. There is also evidence of later, superposing lineated valley fills originating from far thinner localized Alpine-like glaciation events that occurred after the retreat of this extremely thick glacial event.

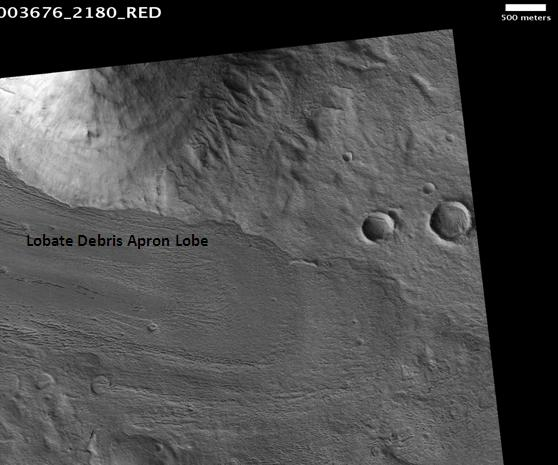
A lobate debris apron in the Phlegra Montes, as seen by HiRISE. The debris apron is most likely enriched with water ice. Scale bar is 500 metres (1,600 ft) long.

Historically, researchers proposed that the Phlegra Montes ranges may have once been part of a crater rim. Others noted the lack of clear impact structures and have proposed that the ranges were formed through extensional block faulting. Upon an initial review of Mariner 9 imagery in the 1980s, the Phlegra Montes were once proposed to be the only mountain range system on Mars strictly controlled by tectonics, although later examples of extremely linear ridges were later identified within the Claritas Fossae and the Thaumasia Highlands. The notion that the Phlegra Montes ranges might have resulted from compressional activity was first articulated in the 1990s, when researchers identified a potential fold and thrust belt in the Coprates Rise on the Thaumasia Plateau in Tharsis and then analogized the features of that structure to other ridges on the planet (including the Phlegra Montes). The parallel nature of the wrinkle ridges of Phlegra Dorsa was regarded as a critical aspect of this hypothesis. The massifs of the Phlegra Montes were also compared to Amenthes Rupes and Eridania Scopulus.

Norman Sleep, who first proposed a model for plate tectonics on Mars in the 1990s to explain the origin of the northern lowlands, indicated that the Phlegra Montes range might constitute physiographic evidence of a transform-fault plate boundary. Later researchers found that his claim was inconsistent in orientation and fault type with the structural features that were actually present in the range.

More recently, researchers have analyzed the Phlegra Montes as the product of activity on a major Martian thrust fault network. Its asymmetrical profile is characteristic of these putative compressively tectonic structures. Researchers favoring the thrust fault-based interpretation have identified nine major thrust faults bounding the Phlegra Montes massifs, generally to the east. The knobby massif terrains of the Phlegra Montes are typically on the hanging wall of the thrust faults in this region. In some cases, craters (including the large Adams crater in the southern region of the Phlegra Montes) are observed to overprint these putative thrust faults, but not the craters' debris aprons. This is strongly suggestive of ongoing tectonic activity along the identified fault lines.

Many craters in the vicinity of the Phlegra Montes display a characteristic concentric crater fill (CCF) pattern, in which ridges and grooves are found in a concentric alignment to the rim of the crater. The boundary of each concentric region of fill is lobate in shape. For this reason, some researchers have proposed a mechanism in which regional-scale glaciation began to retreat.

=== Lineated valley fills ===
Valleys cross-cut the Phlegra ranges and are occasionally occupied to some degree by lineated valley fills. These landforms are intricately patterned texturations that appears to demonstrate erosive characteristics in the upland, depositional characteristics in the lowlands, and indicators of directional flow between the two. In some valleys, lineated valley fills have been found to descend both the east and west foothills of the Phlegra mountain range system. These fills are sometimes banded by hummocky pits (interpreted as recessional moraines) and display regions where flow patterns appear turbulently disrupted or appear to have been backfilled by material associated with the flow. Pitted surfaces abound and—in addition to the disrupted surfaces—are typically associated with the degradation of a glacial surface near the glacier's terminus.

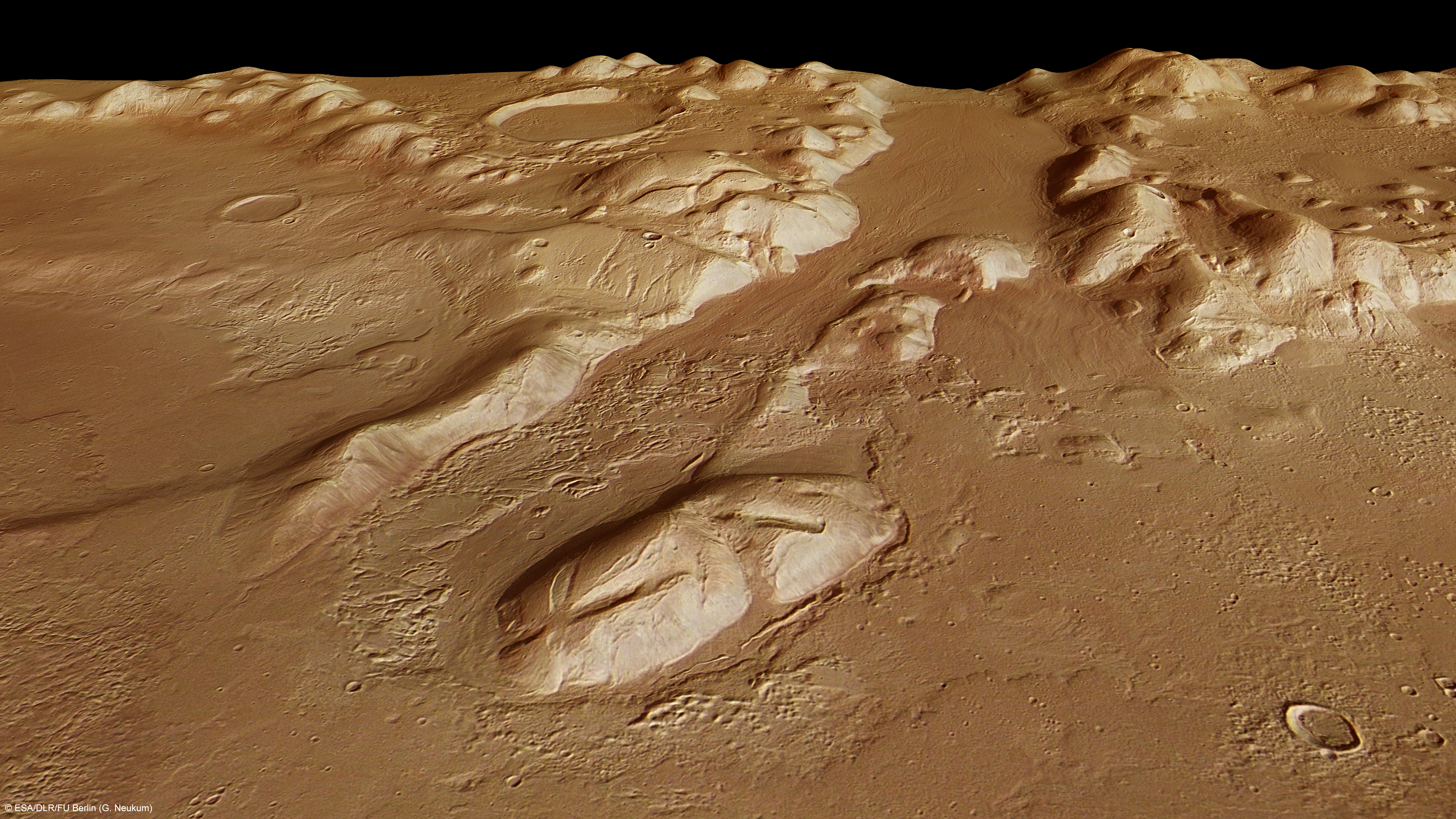
A lineated valley fill within a graben in the southern Phlegra Montes, descending down the massifs' western piedmont. HRSC digital terrain model. This particular landform was examined in detail by Colman Gallagher and Matthew Balme in a 2015 study.

Furrow-like ridges are observed along these flows, and are interpreted as having been incised by longitudinal flows originating from the degrading upstream material. In some parts of the lineated valley flows in the Phlegra Montes region sinuous ridges (interpreted as eskers) are observed, which have been observed on Earth when glacial meltwater incises exposed downstream terrains. Because ring mold craters have been observed atop these lineated valley flows, this implies that these landforms are enriched with ice. Researchers have noted that at least one major lineated valley fill in the southern Phlegra range appears to only partially fill a previously incised valley, suggesting that the lineated valley fills observed in the Phlegra Montes were not associated with the initial formation of these valleys. The proposed aforementioned glacial morphologies have been analogized to terrestrial esker sites in Svalbard and Ireland.

A glacial interpretation for the source of the Phlegra Montes' geomorphological features requires basal melting at proportions that cannot be explained by the glacier's thickness alone. It also cannot be explained by the established cold and dry climatic conditions of the late Amazonian period on Mars. For this reason, geothermal heat flux has been evoked by researchers to satisfy this requirement.

== Observational history ==
=== 20th century ===
In 1970, Wolfgang E. Elston published a geomorphic map of the Cebrenia quadrangle, which stretches across wide swaths of the Vastitas Borealis Formation and the mid-latitudinal northern lowlands north of the Elysium Rise and the outflow channels to the west of the volcanic province (such as Hrad Valles). This is the first detailed geomorphic map that includes the Phlegra Montes province.

In 1976, Daniel H. Scott and Michael H. Carr published a global geomorphic map of Mars through the United States Geological Survey at a very coarse 1:25M scale. The researchers indicated that the Phlegra Montes region might have been a part of a hitherto-unidentified impact basin.

In 1979, Steve Squyres of Cornell University noted the presence of mass wasting-derived structures in Nilosyrtis Mensae and Protonilus Mensae and generalized this report to identify what he termed "lobate debris aprons" on any scarp subject to sufficient seasonal ice deposition. He also claimed that any lobate debris apron constrained to the pathway of a narrow valley would manifest as a "lineated valley fill". The Phlegra Montes was noted in particular by Squyres as a site in the northern lowlands where these features were concentrated outside zones of fretted terrain.

In 1985, James H. Moore of Arizona State University published an abstract for the 16th Lunar and Planetary Science Conference (held in The Woodlands, Texas) proffering interpretations of the Phlegra Montes' origin based on topographic and gravity data. He noted that the western piedmont of the range system appeared to slope gradually, while the eastern piedmont was bounded by an escarpment. Moore interpreted the massifs of the Phlegra Montes as block-faulted, in contradiction to the contemporary understanding that the mountains had formed in association with impact-related processes; Moore found no evidence of characteristic impact-related features in the vicinity of the ranges. He argued for an endogenic origin (rather than an exogenic, impact-based one) due to the alignment of the feature with Elysium, similar to the alignment of Claritas Fossae with the Tharsis Rise, analogizing the formation mechanism terrestrially to the African superswell or the Hawaiian hotspot.

In 1986, J. Lynn Hall, Sean C. Solomon (Massachusetts Institute of Technology) and James W. Head (Brown University) modeled stresses in the Elysium Rise based on the distribution of extensional and compressional tectonic features seen on Viking imagery. They then extended this study by superposing their data atop other models of stress created around the Tharsis Rise, whose globally influential stress field would have affected any compressional or extensional features created by the formation of Elysium. The north-south-oriented wrinkle ridges of the Phlegra Montes region were best-predicted by a superposed model that the researchers prepared involving Tharsis, Elysium, and Hecates Tholus (which is thought to predate the rise of Elysium Mons).

In 1993, Kenneth L. Tanaka (United States Geological Survey) and Richard A. Schultz (University of Nevada, Reno) published a conference paper in which a series of parallel rises in the Thaumasia Plateau around the Coprates Rise and proposed based on its geomorphological indicators that the region was a fold and thrust belt. Similar parallel compressional features were observed in the vicinity of the Phlegra Montes, and the authors proposed that this region may also be a fold and thrust belt.

In 1995, Michael J. Pruis and Kenneth L. Tanaka of the United States Geological Survey published an abstract for the 26th Lunar and Planetary Science Conference, identifying tectonic features in the Martian northern plains that were inconsistent with a plate tectonics-based model introduced in 1994 by Norman J. Sleep of Stanford University. The orientation of the Phlegra Montes was reported as consistent with Sleep's model, assuming that they were superposed by transform faults. However, Tanaka and Pruis did not identify any transform offset in this region. Due to the parallel nature of the Phlegra Dorsa ridges to the massifs, and the presence of perpendicular graben (extensional stresses), there is a strong implication of a localized east-west compressive stress in contradiction to the predictions made by Sleep's model.

=== 21st century ===
In 2010, James L. Dickson and James W. Head (Brown University) and David R. Marchant (Boston University) characterized a crater in the neighborhood of the Phlegra Montes that was superposed by a second, smaller crater. Rather than bearing morphologies of the concentric crater fills observed throughout most of this region, characteristics similar to that of lineated valley fills and lobate debris aprons were observed within this second perched crater. This double crater system formed on the contact between the Phlegra Montes debris apron and the Vastitas Borealis Formation. Although the smaller crater is perched on the larger crater's rim, the morphological characteristics of the lineated valley fills within this second crater imply that it was back-filled with ice-rich material filling the much deeper basin. The researchers interpret that this situation could only have been possible if a period of thick kilometer-scale glaciation persisted in the Phlegra Montes, and they associate the formation of the flow with the recession of this glacier. However, the authors indicate that a regional glaciation, although possible, is not required to explain the morphologies observed in this region.

An abstract was submitted in 2010 to the 41st Lunar and Planetary Science Conference by Ailish Kress and James W. Head (Brown University), Roberto Seu (Sapienza University of Rome), Jeffrey Plaut and Ali Safaeinili (Jet Propulsion Laboratory), Jack Holt (University of Texas, Austin), Liliya Posiolova (Malin Space Science Systems), and Roger Phillips (Southwest Research Institute). SHARAD radar data was used to identify the dielectric constant and the subsurface structure of the lobate debris aprons to the west of the Phlegra massifs. The presence of ring-mold craters on the debris apron further supported the hypothesis that these geomorphological features are likely pure ice overlain by a very thin debris cover.

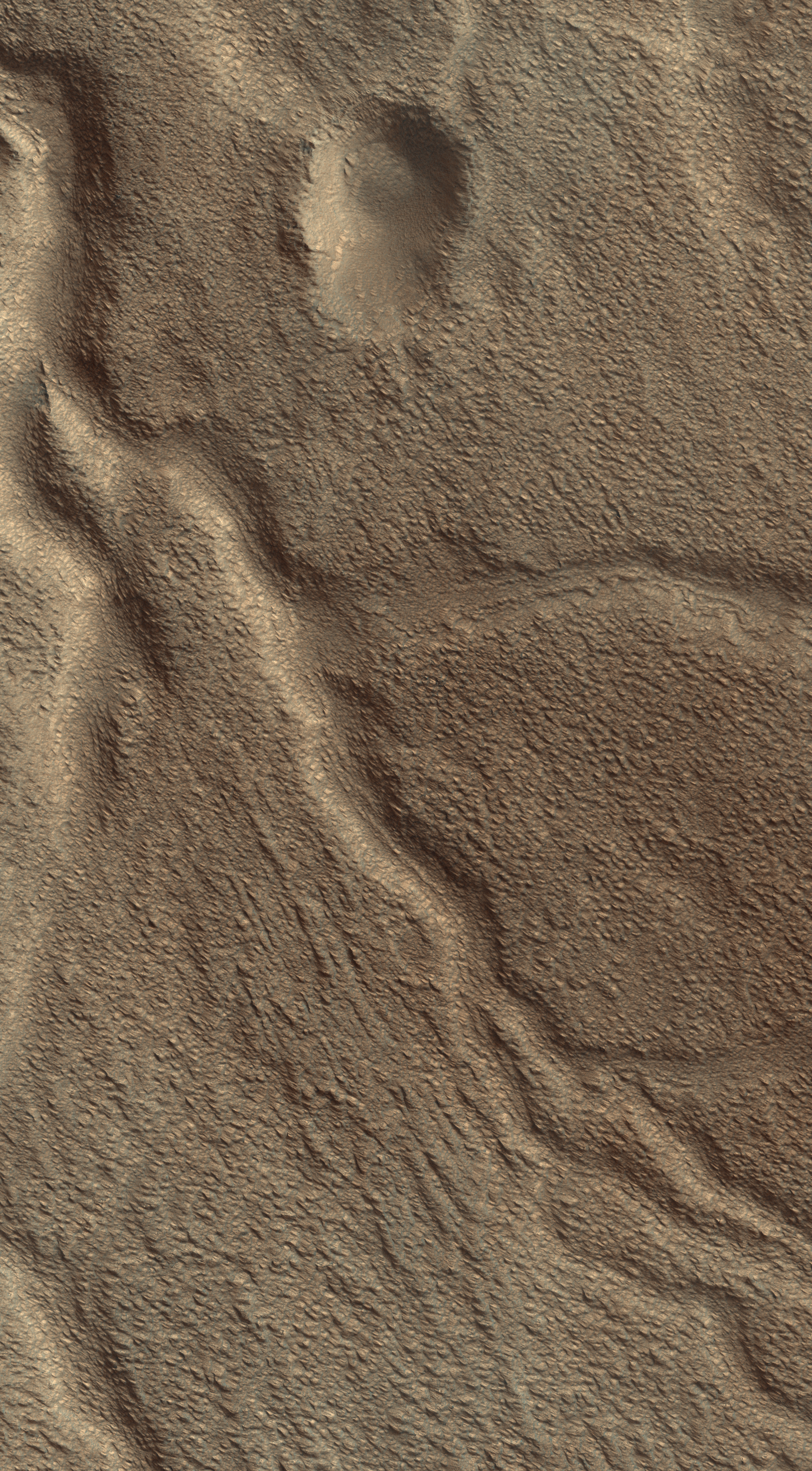
A landform in the Phlegra Montes interpreted by some researchers to be eskers formed by the retreat of the glacial structure that produced its associated lineated valley fill. HiRISE. Image is 5 kilometres (3.1 mi) across in the horizontal direction.

In 2014, German researchers Stephan van Gasselt, Julia Schulz, and Csilla Orgel (Free University of Berlin) submitted abstracts to the European Geosciences Union General Assembly meeting in Vienna and the European Planetary Science Congress in Cascais, Portugal, tied to their work mapping the spatial distribution of and updating crater age dates on lobate debris aprons in the Phlegra Montes region. Age dates placed nearly all the lobate debris aprons features around the ranges between 1.06 Ga (in the south) and 515 Ma (in the north) in age. The motivation of this work is to identify obliquity-driven climatic shifts, which control the accumulation of ice-rich materials at higher latitudes.

In 2015, Colman Gallagher (University College Dublin) and Matthew Balme (Open University) reported on a series of features they observed within a lineated valley fill in the southern Phlegra Montes, most notably interpreting a series of sinuous ridges as eskers in the fill's eastern piedmont. Such landforms are abundant on Earth and are typically indicative of warm and wet climatic conditions known to have been absent on Mars in the late Amazonian period. They explained the abundance of these putative eskers near the Phlegra Montes with the regionally high geothermal heat flux. The authors assert that this is the first instance in which an esker on Mars has been linked to a parent glacier.

Also in 2015, an abstract was submitted to the 46th Lunar and Planetary Sciences Conference by German researchers Stephan van Gasselt, Csilla Orgel, Julia Schulz (Free University of Berlin), and Angelo Pio Rossi (Jacobs University Bremen) regarding an updated assessment of crater count age dates in the Phlegra Montes region. Estimates for the rate of denudation were offered for several units, including lineated valley fills in the Phlegra Montes region.

In 2018, Christian Klimczak (University of Georgia), Corbin L. Kling, and Paul K. Byrne (North Carolina State University) reported a comparative assessment of eight different regions on Mars thought to have been formed through the activity of large and extensive thrust faults, comparing them to terrestrial thrust belts and certain compressive features observed on Mercury. The Phlegra Montes was among the tectonically controlled systems examined by the researchers, who identified nine major thrust faults bounding the region. They also submitted an abstract to attend the European Planetary Science Congress in Berlin to discuss their recent work.

== See also ==
- HiRISE
- Geology of Mars
- List of mountains on Mars by height
