= FPI =

FPI may refer to:

== Government and politics ==
- Federal Prison Industries, a US government corporation which employs prison labor
- Foreign Policy Initiative, an American think tank
- Foreign Policy Institute (Turkey), a Turkish think tank
- The Foreign Policy Institute, a research institute at Johns Hopkins University
- Islam Defenders Front (Indonesian: Front Pembela Islam), an Indonesian political organization
- Ivorian Popular Front (French: Front populaire ivoirien)
- The Service for Foreign Policy Instruments, a service of the European Commission

== Science, engineering and mathematics ==
- Fabry–Pérot interferometer
- Fast probability integration, a method used in reliability engineering
- Fixed-point iteration
- Fluorescent penetrant inspection
- Formal Public Identifier
- Freiburger Persönlichkeitsinventar, a psychological personality test

== Other uses ==
- Family and Parenting Institute
- Faridpur Polytechnic Institute
- Football Power Index
- Force Protection Inc, an American military vehicle manufacturer
- Foreign portfolio investment
- Free Press of India
- Frunze Polytechnic Institute, now Kyrgyz Technical University
