= Casius quadrangle =

Map of Mars

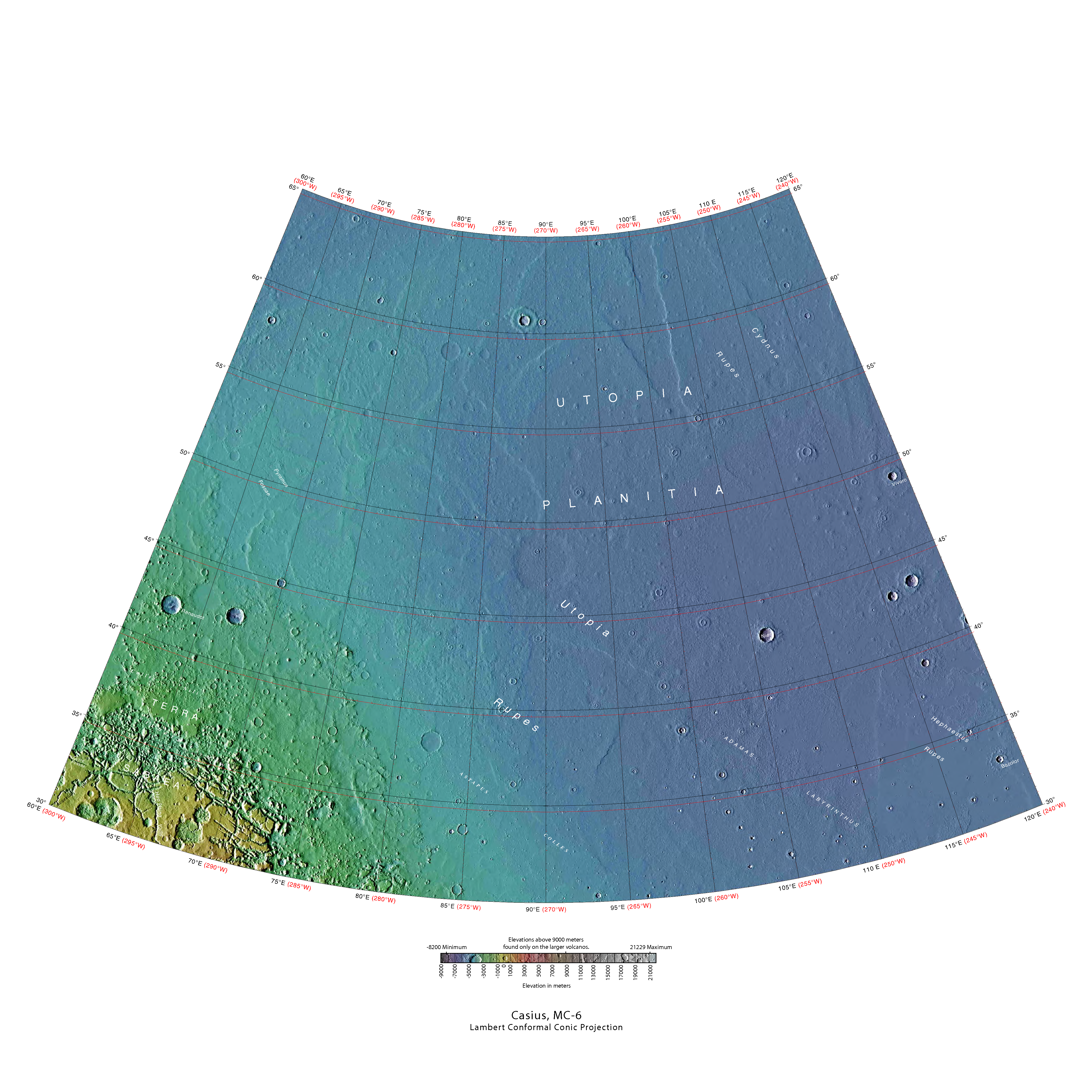
- Elevation map of Casius quadrangle from Mars Orbiter Laser Altimeter (MOLA) data.
- Coordinates: 47.5°N 270°W

The Casius quadrangle is one of a series of 30 quadrangle maps of Mars used by the United States Geological Survey (USGS) Astrogeology Research Program. The quadrangle is located in the north-central portion of Mars' eastern hemisphere and covers 60° to 120° east longitude (240° to 300° west longitude) and 30° to 65° north latitude. The quadrangle uses a Lambert conformal conic projection at a nominal scale of 1:5,000,000 (1:5M). The Casius quadrangle is also referred to as MC-6 (Mars Chart-6). Casius quadrangle contains part of Utopia Planitia and a small part of Terra Sabaea. The southern and northern borders of the Casius quadrangle are approximately 3,065 km and 1,500 km wide, respectively. The north to south distance is about 2,050 km (slightly less than the length of Greenland). The quadrangle covers an approximate area of 4.9 million square km, or a little over 3% of Mars' surface area.

== Origin of name ==
Casius is the name of a telescopic albedo feature located at 40° N and 100° E on Mars. The feature was named by Schiaparelli in 1888 after Mt Casius in Egypt, famous in antiquity for the nearby coastal marshes in which whole armies were reputed to have drowned. The name was approved by the International Astronomical Union (IAU) in 1958.

== Physiography and geology ==
The high latitude Casius quadrangle bears several features that are believed to indicate the presence of ground ice. Patterned ground is one such feature. Usually, polygonal shapes are found poleward of 55 degrees latitude. Other features associated with ground ice are scalloped topography, Ring mold craters, and concentric crater fill.

== See also ==
- Climate of Mars
- Geology of Mars
- Patterned ground
- Water on Mars

MC-01 Mare Boreum (features)
MC-02 Diacria (features)		MC-03 Arcadia (features)	MC-04 Acidalium (features)	MC-05 Ismenius Lacus (features)		MC-06 Casius (features)	MC-07 Cebrenia (features)
MC-08 Amazonis (features)	MC-09 Tharsis (features)	MC-10 Lunae Palus (features)	MC-11 Oxia Palus (features)	MC-12 Arabia (features)	MC-13 Syrtis Major (features)	MC-14 Amenthes (features)	MC-15 Elysium (features)
MC-16 Memnonia (features)	MC-17 Phoenicis Lacus (features)	MC-18 Coprates (features)	MC-19 Margaritifer Sinus (features)	MC-20 Sinus Sabaeus (features)	MC-21 Iapygia (features)	MC-22 Mare Tyrrhenum (features)	MC-23 Aeolis (features)
MC-24 Phaethontis (features)		MC-25 Thaumasia (features)	MC-26 Argyre (features)	MC-27 Noachis (features)		MC-28 Hellas (features)	MC-29 Eridania (features)
MC-30 Mare Australe (features)
