= Michael Hasofer =

Australian statistician (1927–2024)

- Born: 2 October 1927; Alexandria, Egypt
- Died: 3 June 2010 (aged 82); Melbourne, Australia
- Education: University of Tasmania
- Scientific career
- Fields: Mathematics (Statistics)
- Workplaces: University of New South Wales; La Trobe University

Notes
- Hebrew dates: 6 Tishri 5688 - 21 Sivan 5770

Abraham Michael Hasofer (1927–2010) was an Australian statistician. He was a professor and the Chair of Statistics within the Mathematics Department in the University of New South Wales from 1969 to 1991. He subsequently held a position at the La Trobe University in Melbourne. He authored a number of publications in the field of applied mathematics and civil engineering, including his formulation of the Hasofer-Lind Reliability Index.

== Biography ==
Abraham Hasofer was born in Alexandria, Egypt, on 2 October 1927 to an Ashkenazi Jewish family. In 1948, while in Egypt, Hasofer was interned in a Concentration camp and was later expelled from the country as part of the Jewish exodus from the Muslim world. Hasofer soon migrated to Israel after the state's independence but subsequently migrated to Australia in 1955. Hasofer joined the Hobart Hebrew Congregation and led services there. In the 1960s, Hasofer joined the Chabad Hasidic movement. Hasofer lived in Tasmania and had been visited by Rabbi C. Gutnick who assisted him with observing the Jewish dietary laws.

=== Education and career ===
In 1948, Hasofer earned a bachelor's degree in Electrical Engineering from the University of Alexandria in Egypt. In 1960, he earned a Bachelor of Science from the University of Tasmania, and in 1964, Hasofer earned his PhD in Mathematical Statistics from the University of Tasmania which was the first PhD degree earned in the university's Department of Mathematics. At the time, Hasofer was a lecturer in the department. Hasofer went on to become Professor of Statistics at the University of New South Wales (UNSW). He was chair of statistics within the Mathematics Department for much of his career. Prior to Hasofer's position at UNSW, he was a resident Fellow of the Australian National University in Canberra from 1955 to 1956. Hasofer and his family remained in Canberra until 1969. Hasofer was a visiting professor at Massachusetts Institute of Technology (MIT) and Princeton University. Hasofer received the status of emeritus professor at UNSW. Hasofer died in 2010.

=== Activities ===
Hasofer's work in mathematics included the formulation of the advanced statistical method known as the Hasofer-Lind Reliability Index which is recognized as an important step towards the development of contemporary methods to effectively and accurately estimate structural safety. The Hasofer-Lind Reliability Index is more often called the first-order reliability method (FORM) which Hasofer successfully applied as a method to resolving structural problems. Alternatively, it is referred to as the first order second-moment reliability index. Hasofer's research has been used in the field of fMRI research. Hasofer also developed a statistical goodness-of-fit procedure in 1992.

=== In the Jewish community ===
While living in Canberra, Michael Hasofer and his wife Atara Hasofer were faced with the challenge of the lack of kosher meat in the Australian capital, a challenge that had discouraged other Orthodox families from residing in the city. Hasofer attended a course on the Jewish ritual laws of the slaughter of poultry (shechitat ofot) and made his services available to the community. However, the Jewish community in Canberra took little advantage of the offer. While in Canberra, Hasofer served the Jewish community as a synagogue officiant. He and his wife Atara also served as members of the Education Committee, with Atara establishing a local chapter of the N'shei Chabad, the Habad-Lubavitch Women's Association. Within the wider Australian Jewish community, Hasofer advocated for traditional Jewish schooling.

In the Orthodox Jewish community, Hasofer's activities include his serving as the founding president of the Australian chapter of the Association of Orthodox Jewish Scientists (AOJS). Hasofer supported Dr Lee Spetner's stance on Neo-Darwinism which questioned the plausibility of the evolutionary theory of the appearance of beneficial mutations. Spetner's calculations of the probability of beneficial mutations led him to conclude that is unreasonable to assume that beneficial mutations can be produced even in a generous allocation of geological time. In the 1990s, Hasofer rejected the validity of Bible codes which he viewed as statistically unfounded. While teaching at the Australian National University in Canberra, Hasofer researched notions of probability and random mechanisms discussed in Talmudic literature. According to Hasofer, the attitude of Ancient Israel toward chance mechanism was diametrically opposed to that of neighboring nations. Dice had been used for gambling as well as for divination in Greek and Roman temples, while Jews were forbidden and sanctioned for use of dice. Lots were used by Jews to settle disputes, as a fair method to allocate duties among contenders, among other uses. This subject was further researched by Nahum Rabinovitch who explored Talmudic probabilistic notions and chance mechanisms.

== Publications ==
=== Books ===
- Hasofer, Abraham Michael, Vaughan Rodney Beck, and I. D. Bennetts. Risk Analysis in Building Fire Safety Engineering. Routledge, 2006.

=== Selected articles ===
- Hasofer, A. M. "On the single-server queue with non-homogeneous Poisson input and general service time." Journal of Applied Probability 1, no. 2 (1964): 369–384.
- Hasofer, Abraham M. "Studies in the history of probability and statistics. XVI. Random mechanisms in Talmudic literature." Biometrika (1967): 316–321.
- Hasofer, A. M. "On the derivative and the upcrossings of the Rayleigh process." Australian Journal of Statistics 12, no. 3 (1970): 150–151.
- Hasofer, A. M. "Design for infrequent overloads." Earthquake Engineering & Structural Dynamics 2, no. 4 (1973): 387–388.
- Hasofer, Abraham M., and Niels C. Lind. "Exact and invariant second-moment code format." Journal of the Engineering Mechanics division 100, no. 1 (1974): 111–121.
- Adler, Robert J., and A. M. Hasofer. "Level crossings for random fields." The Annals of Probability 4, no. 1 (1976): 1–12.
- Hasofer, A. M. "Upcrossings of random fields." Advances in Applied Probability 10 (1978): 14–21.
- Ditlevsen, O., P. Bjerager, R. Olesen, and A. M. Hasofer. "Directional simulation in Gaussian processes." Probabilistic Engineering Mechanics 3, no. 4 (1988): 207–217.
- Hasofer, Abraham M., and Z. Wang. "A test for extreme value domain of attraction." Journal of the American Statistical Association 87, no. 417 (1992): 171–177.
- Hasofer, Abraham Michael, and Isabelle Thomas. "Analysis of fatalities and injuries in building fire statistics." Fire Safety Journal 41, no. 1 (2006): 2–14.

== Awards ==
- 1999 - CERRA Lifetime Achievement Award from the Institute of Electrical and Electronics Engineers ICASSP conference
