= Lee Spetner =

American creationist author (1927–2024)

- לי ספטנר
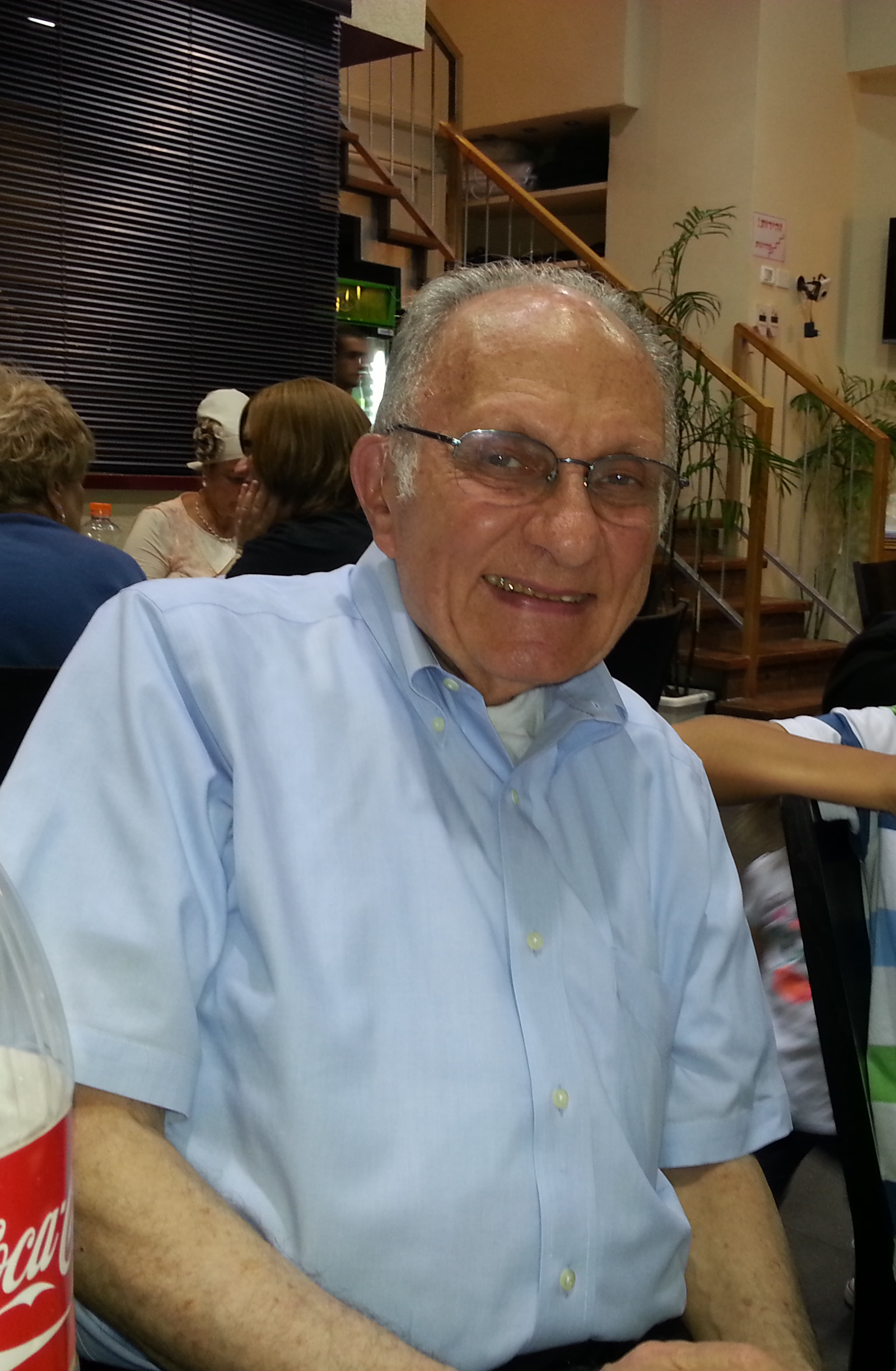
- Spetner in 2013
- Born: January 17, 1927; St. Louis, Missouri, U.S.
- Died: August 9, 2024 (aged 97); Jerusalem
- Education: Washington University in St. Louis; Massachusetts Institute of Technology
- Known for: Critique of modern synthesis
- Scientific career
- Fields: Physics, biophysics
- Workplaces: Johns Hopkins University
- Doctoral advisor: Bruno Rossi

Lee M. Spetner (Hebrew: לי ספטנר; January 17, 1927 – August 9, 2024) was an American and Israeli creationist author, mechanical engineer, applied biophysicist, and physicist, known best for his disagreements with the modern synthesis. In spite of his opposition to neo-Darwinism, Spetner accepted a form of non-random evolution outlined in his 1996 book "Not By Chance! Shattering the Modern Theory of Evolution".

== Biography ==
=== Education ===
Spetner received his BS degree in mechanical engineering from the McKelvey School of Engineering at Washington University in St. Louis in 1945 and his Ph.D. in physics from MIT in 1950, where his Ph.D. thesis advisors were Robert Williams and Bruno Rossi.

=== Career ===
Spetner continued to study at the Applied Physics Laboratory at Johns Hopkins University from 1951 to 1970, working on guided-missile systems. In 1970, he became technical director of Eljim, Ltd., later a subsidiary of Elbit, Ltd. in Nes Tsiona, Israel, where he was a manager, a period that lasted a further 20 years. His work here was on military electronic systems, including electronic countermeasures, and a military electronic navigation system.

He taught courses at Johns Hopkins University, Howard University and the Weizmann Institute, including classical mechanics, electromagnetic theory, real-variable theory, probability theory, and statistical communication theory.

Spetner first became interested in evolution in the 1960s during a fellowship in the Department of Biophysics at Johns Hopkins University. He wrote that he was skeptical of evolutionary theory because of his religious views and because of his intuition about how information in living organisms could have developed. Spetner published several papers on the subject of evolution between 1964 and 1970. In Israel, he continued searching for evidence that contradicted the modern evolutionary synthesis. Spetner was inspired by Rabbi David Luria (1798–1855), who calculated that, according to Talmudic sources, there were 365 originally created species of beasts and 365 of birds. Spetner developed what he called his "nonrandom evolutionary hypothesis," which proposed rapid microevolution (which he attributed to a "built-in ability" in animals and plants to "respond adaptively to environmental stimuli"), and suggested that even some cases of macroevolution could be explained by his hypothesis. Spetner's critical stance on the plausibility of the evolutionary theory of the appearance of beneficial mutations was supported by the Australian statistician Professor Michael Hasofer.

Spetner, an avowed theist, has been described as a Jewish Creationist. However, his Non Random Evolutionary Hypothesis is, in fact, agnostic. It makes no claim that scientific evidence proves a supernatural creator. Additionally, Spetner vehemently rejected the teaching of Creation in public schools, asserting that "the subject is best handled in the home or within a religious environment." In 1980, at a conference for Jewish scientists, Spetner claimed that Archaeopteryx was a fraud. Spetner continued his attack on the modern synthesis in his book Not by chance! Shattering the Modern Theory of Evolution.

Spetner was a critic of the role of mutations in the modern synthesis. Spetner claimed that random mutations lead to a loss of genetic information and that there is no scientific evidence to support common descent:

We see then that the mutation reduces the specificity of the ribosome protein and that means a loss of genetic information. ... Rather than saying the bacterium gained resistance to the antibiotic, it is more correct to say that is lost sensitivity to it. ... All point mutations that have been studied on the molecular level turn out to reduce the genetic information and not increase it.

— Lee Spetner, Not by Chance, Shattering the Modern Theory of Evolution

Spetner continued to study after retirement, pursuing interests in evolution and cancer cures.

Spetner's last book "The Evolution Revolution: Why Thinking People are Rethinking Evolution" develops his nonrandom hypothesis (NREH) and was published in 2014 by Judaica Press.

=== Death ===
Spetner died in Jerusalem on August 9, 2024, at the age of 97.
