= First-order reliability method =

Semi-probabilistic reliability analysis method

The first-order reliability method (FORM) is a semi-probabilistic reliability analysis method devised to evaluate the reliability of a system. The accuracy of the method can be improved by averaging over many samples, which is known as Line Sampling.

The method is also known as the Hasofer-Lind Reliability Index, developed by Professor Michael Hasofer and Professor Niels Lind in 1974. The index has been recognized as an important step towards the development of contemporary methods to effectively and accurately estimate structural safety.

The analysis method depends on a "Most Probable Point" on the limit state

== See also ==
- EN 1990
- Fast probability integration
- Stress–strength analysis
