= Stress–strength analysis =

Probability density of stress S (red, top) and resistance R (blue, top), and of equality (m = R - S = 0, black, bottom).

Distribution of stress S and strength R: all the (R, S) situations have a probability density (grey level surface). The area where the margin m = R - S is positive is the set of situation where the system is reliable (R > S).

Stress–strength analysis is the analysis of the strength of the materials and the interference of the stresses placed on the materials, where "materials" is not necessarily the raw goods or parts, but can be an entire system. Stress-Strength Analysis is a tool used in reliability engineering.

Environmental stresses have a distribution with a mean $\left(\mu_x\right)$ and a standard deviation $\left(s_x\right)$ and component strengths have a distribution with a mean $\left(\mu_y\right)$ and a standard deviation $\left(s_y\right)$. The overlap of these distributions is the probability of failure $\left(Z\right)$. This overlap is also referred to stress-strength interference.

== Reliability ==
If the distributions for both the stress and the strength both follow a Normal distribution, then the reliability (R) of a component can be determined by the following equation: $R = 1 - P(Z)$, where

$Z = -\frac{\mu_y - \mu_x}{\sqrt{ s_x^2 + s_y^2}}$

P(Z) can be determined from a Z table or a statistical software package.

== See also ==
- First-order reliability method
