= NESSUS Probabilistic Analysis Software =

NESSUS is a general-purpose, probabilistic analysis program that simulates variations and uncertainties in loads, geometry, material behavior and other user-defined inputs to compute probability of failure and probabilistic sensitivity measures of engineered systems. Because NESSUS uses highly efficient and accurate probabilistic analysis methods, probabilistic solutions can be obtained even for extremely large and complex models. The system performance can be hierarchically decomposed into multiple smaller models and/or analytical equations. Once the probabilistic response is quantified, the results can be used to support risk-informed decisions regarding reliability for safety critical and one-of-a-kind systems, and to maintain a level of quality while reducing manufacturing costs for larger quantity products.

NESSUS is interfaced to all major commercial finite element programs and includes capabilities for analyzing computationally intensive real-world problems. It has been successfully applied to a diverse range of problems in aerospace, gas turbine engines, biomechanics, pipelines, defense, weaponry and infrastructure.

== Project history ==
NESSUS was originally developed by a team led by Southwest Research Institute (SwRI) as part of a 10-year NASA project to develop a probabilistic design tool for the Space Shuttle main engine.

In 1999, SwRI was contracted by Los Alamos National Laboratory (LANL) to adapt NESSUS for application to extremely large and complex weapon reliability problems in support of its Stockpile Stewardship program.

In 2002, SwRI was contracted by the NASA Glenn Research Center to further enhance NESSUS for application to large-scale, aero-propulsion system problems.

The end result of these two large programs was a completely redesigned software tool — NESSUS Version 8.2 — that includes a graphical user interface, three-dimensional probability contouring and results visualization, capabilities for performing advanced design of experiments and sensitivity analysis, a probabilistic input database, and interfaces to many new third-party codes such as ABAQUS, ANSYS, LS-DYNA, MSC.NASTRAN and ParaDyn.

== Applications ==
NESSUS can compute the probabilistic response or reliability of virtually any engineered system where mathematical models can be developed to describe the performance of the system. NESSUS has been applied to a diverse range of problems including aerospace structures, automotive structures, biomechanics, gas turbine engines, geomechanics, nuclear waste packaging, offshore structures, pipelines and rotordynamics.

Recent specific applications of NESSUS include:

- Aircraft Control Lever Fatigue
- Automotive Crankshaft High-Cycle Fatigue
- Cervical Spine Impact Injury
- Tunnel Vulnerability Assessment
- Orthopaedic Implant Cement Loosening
- Stochastic Crashworthiness in Head-on Impact
- Nuclear Weapon System Verification and Validation
- Pipeline Reliability Assessment
- Space Shuttle Main Engine Flow Line

== See also ==
- Fast probability integration
