= Phlegra Dorsa =

Region on Mars

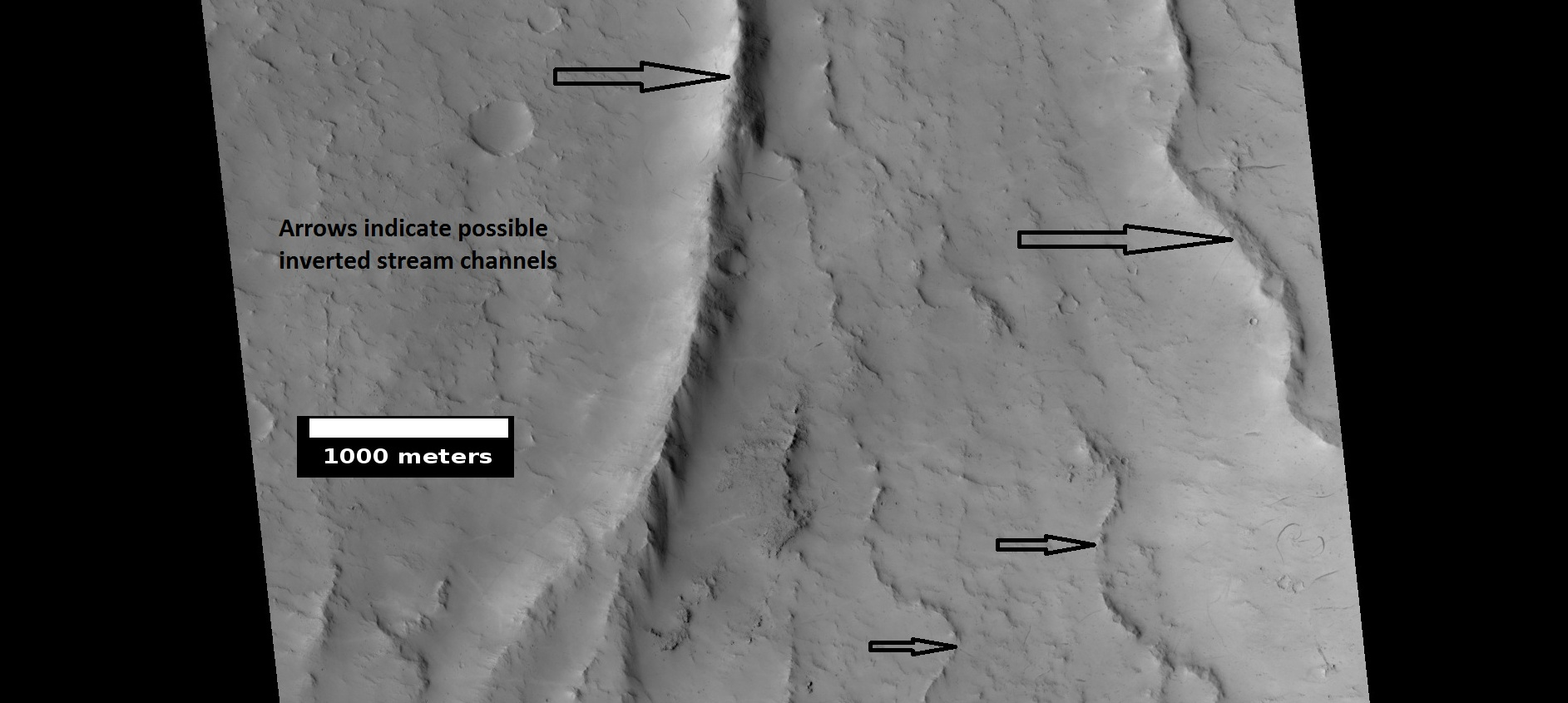
Possible inverted stream channels in Phlegra Dorsa region, as seen by HiRISE under HiWish program. The ridges were probably once stream valleys that have become full of sediment and cemented. So, they became hardened against erosion which removed surrounding material.

Phlegra Dorsa is a region in the Amazonis quadrangle of Mars located at 25.08 N and 170.37 E. It is 2818.61 km across and was named for classical albedo feature. The classic feature meant "burning plain"; it was a place in Chalcidian Peninsula of Greece where Zeus hurled thunderbolts at Titans to support Hercules. The name Phlegra Dorsa was approved in 2003.

== See also ==
- Amazonis Planitia
