= James W. Head =

James W. Head III is the Louis and Elizabeth Scherck Distinguished Professor of Geological Sciences at Brown University. He studies the roles of volcanism in planetary crusts as well as the geological evolution of Mars, and has served as the investigator on many major international planetary investigation missions.

He earned his B.S. from Washington and Lee University in 1964 and his Ph.D. from Brown University in 1969. He spent four years with Bellcomm, Inc in Washington, DC where he helped train Apollo astronauts under the NASA Apollo Lunar Exploration Program.

He has published 25 chapters in books on planetary geology and over 300 refereed articles in scientific journals, and has supervised nearly 40 PhD students.

The asteroid 10110 Jameshead in the main asteroid belt, discovered in 1992 at the Palomar Observatory, was named in his honor.

== Awards and honors ==
- Fellow, American Association for the Advancement of Science, 1993.
- Fellow, Meteoritical Society, 1994.
- Fellow, Geological Society of America, 1995.
- Fellow, American Geophysical Union, 1997.
- Fellow, American Academy of Arts and Sciences, 2006.
- Geological Society of America G. K. Gilbert Award, 2002.
- European Geosciences Union, Runcorn-Florensky Medal, 2010.
