= Southwest Research Institute =

Applied research and development nonprofit organization in Texas, USA

Coordinates: 29°26′33″N 98°36′45″W

- Logo
- Abbreviation: SwRI
- Formation: 1947; 79 years ago
- Founders: Thomas Slick, Jr.
- Type: Independent research and development
- Location: San Antonio, Texas, United States
- Official language: English
- Revenue: $966 million (FY 2025)
- Employees: more than 3,200 (FY 2025)
- Website: swri.org

Southwest Research Institute (SwRI), headquartered in San Antonio, Texas, is an independent and nonprofit applied research and development (R&D) organization. Founded in 1947 by oil businessman Tom Slick, it provides contract research and development services to government and industrial clients.

== Description ==
The institute consists of 10 technical divisions. The Center for Nuclear Waste Regulatory Analyses, a federally funded research and development center sponsored by the U.S. Nuclear Regulatory Commission, also operates on the SwRI grounds. More than 4,000 projects are active at the institute at any given time. These projects are funded between the government and commercial sectors. At the close of fiscal year 2025, the staff numbered approximately 3,200 employees and research volume was $966 million. The institute provided more than $13 million to fund research through its internally sponsored R&D program.

A partial listing of research areas includes space science and engineering; automation, robotics, and intelligent systems; avionics and support systems; bioengineering; chemistry and chemical engineering; corrosion and electrochemistry; earth and planetary sciences; emissions research; engineering mechanics; fire technology; fluid systems and machinery dynamics; and fuels and lubricants. Additional areas include geochemistry; hydrology and geohydrology; materials sciences and fracture mechanics; nondestructive evaluation; oil and gas exploration; pipeline technology; surface modification and coatings; and vehicle, engine, and powertrain design, research, and development. In 2025, staff members published 376 papers in the technical literature and made 507 presentations at technical conferences, seminars and symposia around the world; and submitted 42 invention disclosures; filed 29 patent applications; and received 26 U.S. patent awards.

For more than 75 years, Southwest Research Institute has addressed challenges from deep sea to deep space and everywhere in between. For example, early work in submersibles has led to engineers developing remotely operated deep water rescue vehicles for the U.S. and Australian navies. SwRI is currently adapting extensive expertise in engines, fuels and lubricants for electrified powertrains and alternative fuels research. SwRI's initiatives in robotics and artificial intelligence enable automated vehicles, medical diagnostic support and industrial maintenance, including a mobile robot to remove coatings from commercial aircraft using laser ablation.

SwRI operates a large space science and engineering program, which is home to principal investigators for five major NASA missions, including the Juno mission to Jupiter, the New Horizons mission to Pluto and the Kuiper belt, the Lucy mission to multiple Trojan asteroids near Jupiter, and the PUNCH mission to image the outer reaches of the solar corona.

SwRI's experience also includes advanced pharmaceuticals, direction finding antennas, cybersecurity, and aircraft and infrastructure life extension.

SwRI initiates contracts with clients based on consultations and prepares a formal proposal outlining the scope of work. Subject to client wishes, programs are kept confidential. As part of a long-held tradition, patent rights arising from sponsored research may be assigned to SwRI's clients. SwRI generally retains the rights to institute-funded advancements.

The institute's headquarters occupy more than 2.4 million square feet of office and laboratory space on more than 1,500 acres in San Antonio. SwRI has technical offices and laboratories in Boulder, Colorado; Ann Arbor, Michigan; Warner-Robins, Georgia; Ogden, Utah; Oklahoma City, Oklahoma; Rockville, Maryland; Minneapolis, Minnesota; and other locations.

SwRI's technical magazine Technology Today is published three times each year to spotlight the research and development projects currently underway. A complementary Technology Today podcast is also available.

In 1950, the institute was the focus of Research Ranch, a Screenliner short subject produced by RKO-Pathé studios.

== See also ==
- NESSUS Probabilistic Analysis Software
- Associated Universities, Inc.
