= Ring mold crater =

Type of crater on Mars

A Ring mold crater is a kind of crater on the planet Mars that looks like the ring molds used in baking. They are believed to be caused by an impact into ice. The ice is covered by a layer of debris. They are found in parts of Mars that have buried ice. Laboratory experiments confirm that impacts into ice result in a "ring mold shape." They are also bigger than other craters in which an asteroid impacted solid rock. Impacts into ice warm the ice and cause it to flow into the ring mold shape. These craters are common in lobate debris aprons and lineated valley fill. Many have been found in Mamers Valles, a channel found along the dichotomy boundary in Deuteronilus Mensae. They may be an easy way for future colonists of Mars to find water ice.

A modification of the formation of ring mold craters being formed by impact into an ice layer was presented at a Planetary Science conference in Texas in 2018. This new hypothesis involves mantle layers.

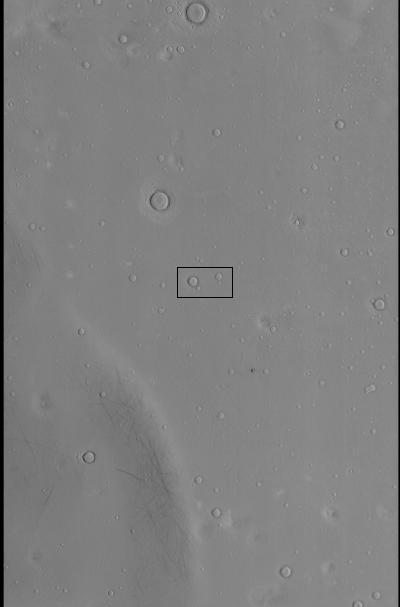
CTX context image for next image taken with HiRISE. Box indicates image footprint of following image.

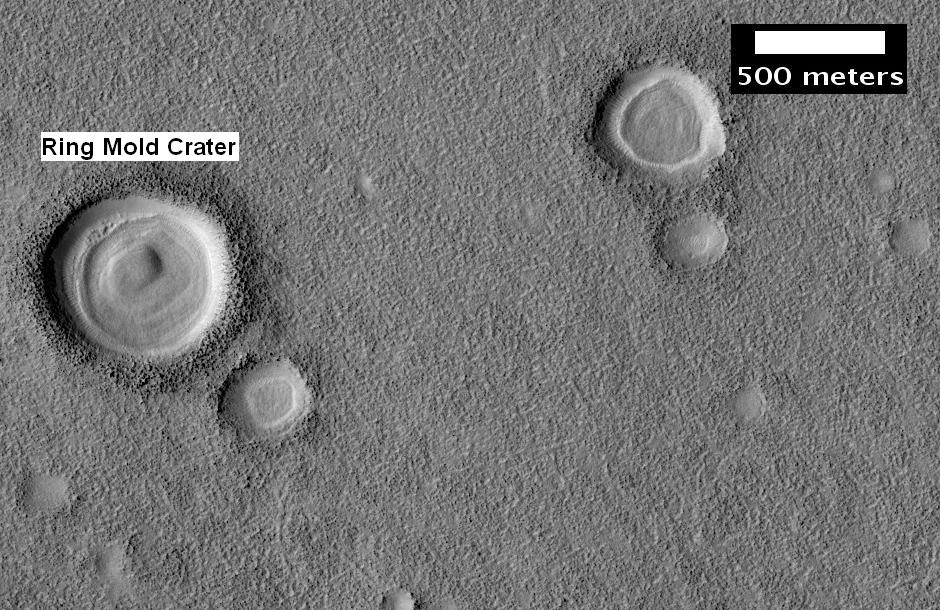
Possible ring mold crater, as seen by HiRISE under the HiWish program. Crater shape is due to impact into ice.

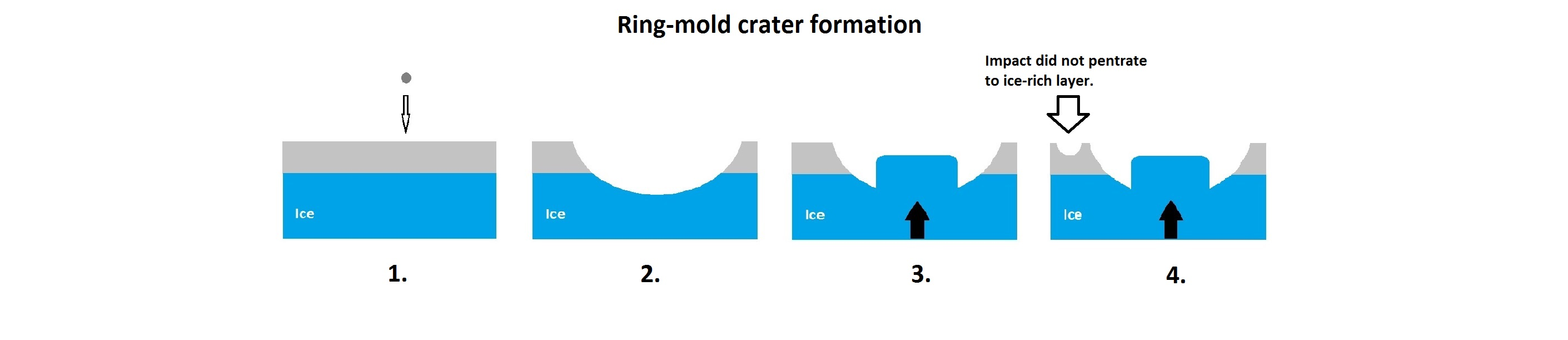
Ring-mold craters form when an impact goes through to an ice layer. The rebound forms the ring-mold shape, and then dust and debris settle on the top to insulate the ice.

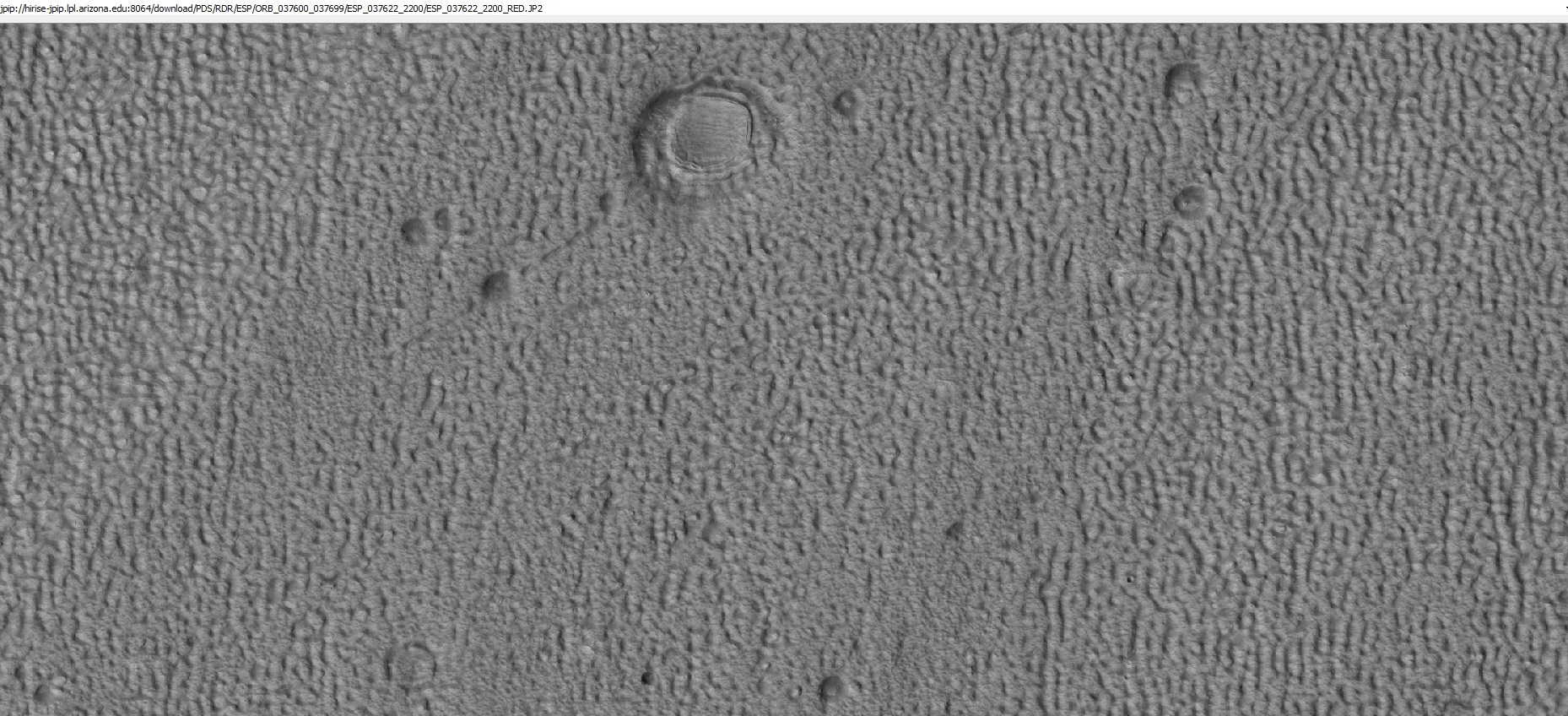
Ring mold craters of various sizes on floor of a crater, as seen by HiRISE under HiWish program Location is Ismenius Lacus quadrangle.

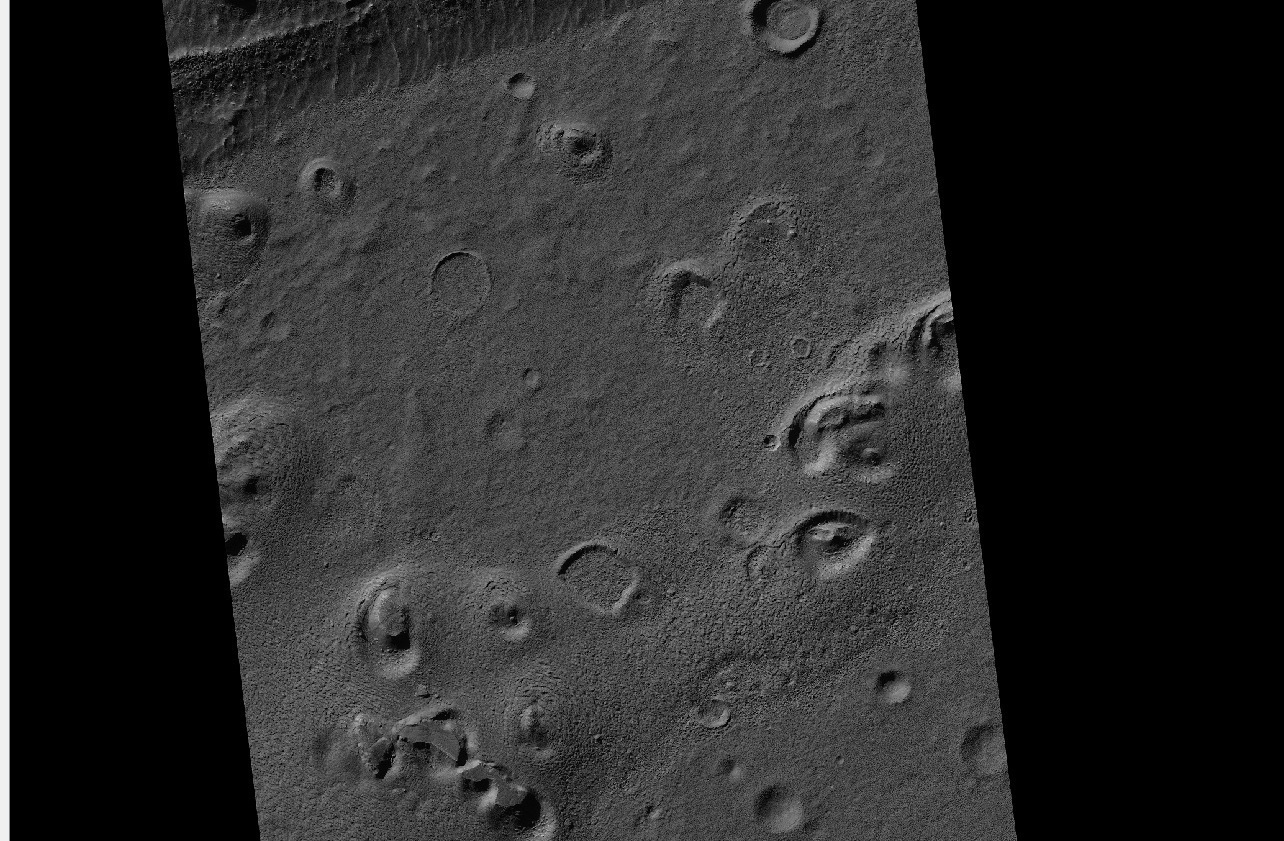
Wide view of a field of ring mold craters, as seen by HiRISE under HiWish program

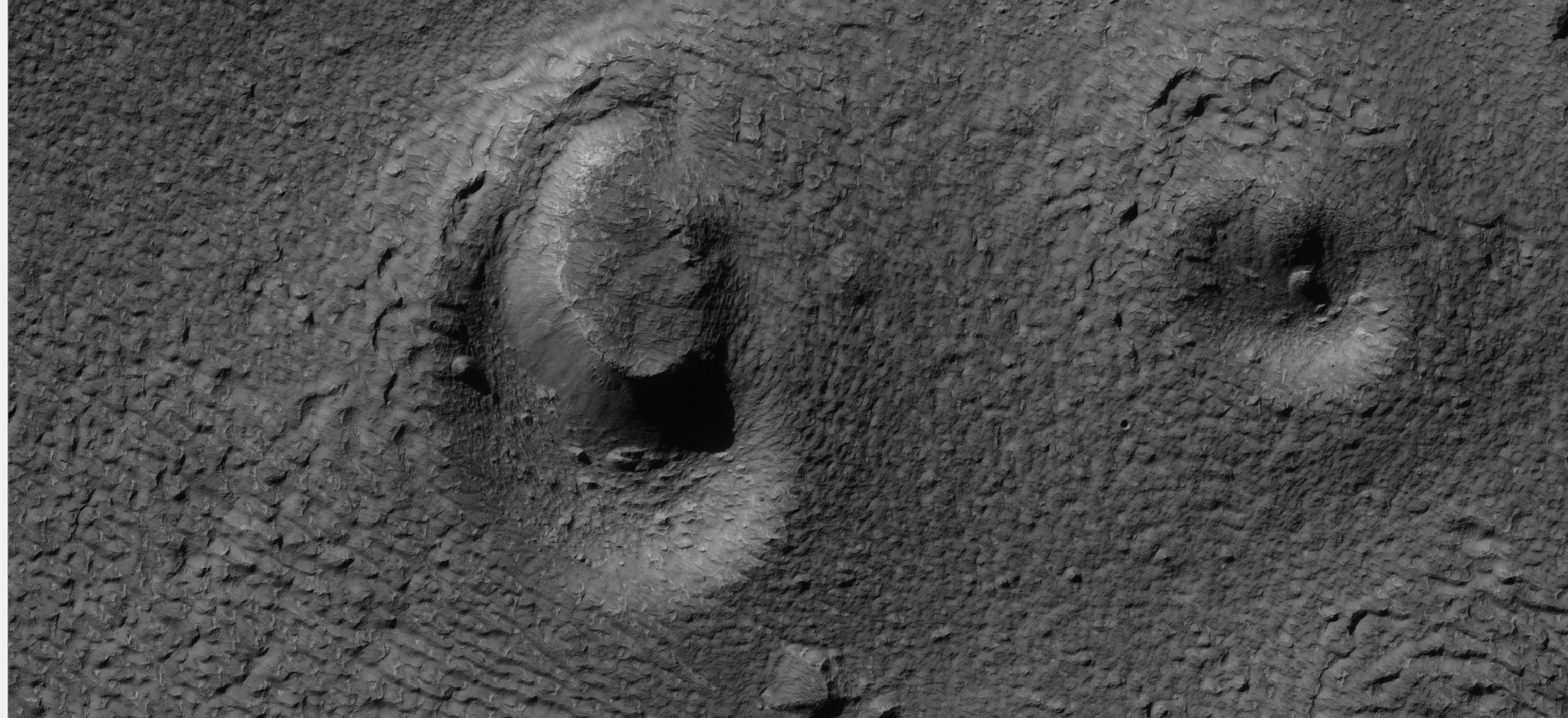
Close view of ring mold crater, as seen by HiRISE under HiWish program Note: this is an enlargement of the previous image of a field of ring mold craters.
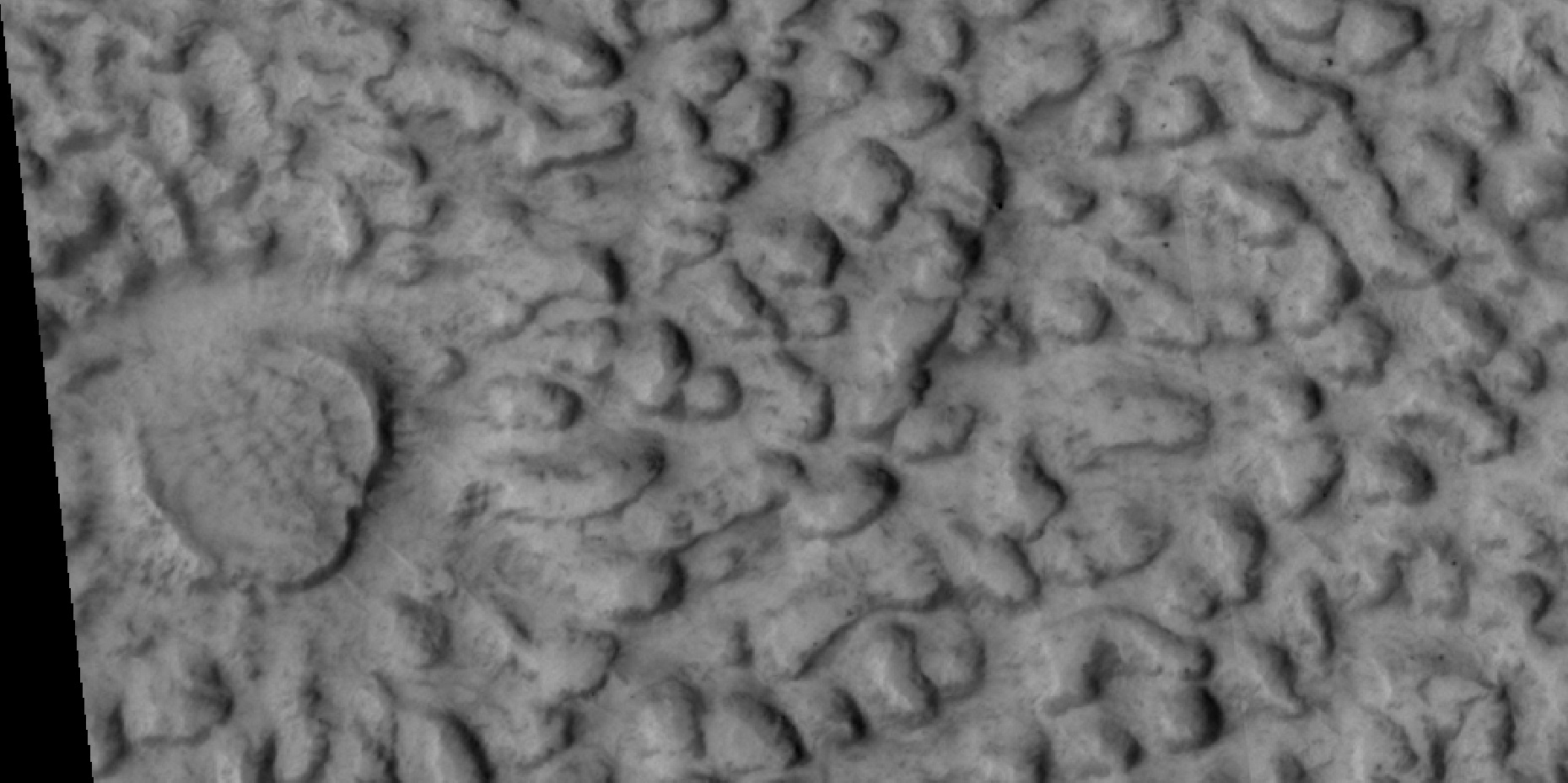
Close view of Ring-mold crater, as seen by HiRISE under HiWish program

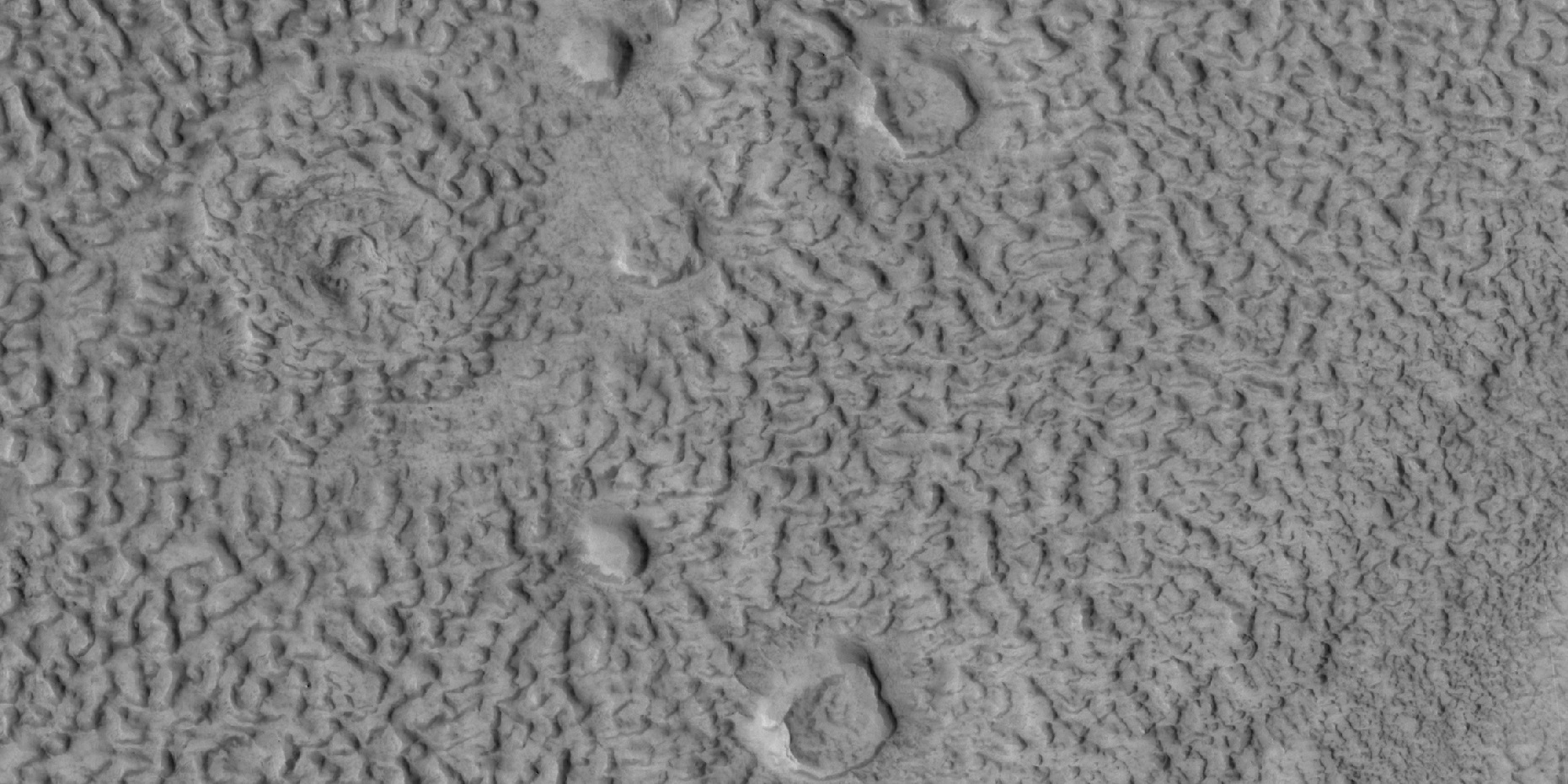
Group of ring-mold craters, as seen by HiRISE under HiWish program
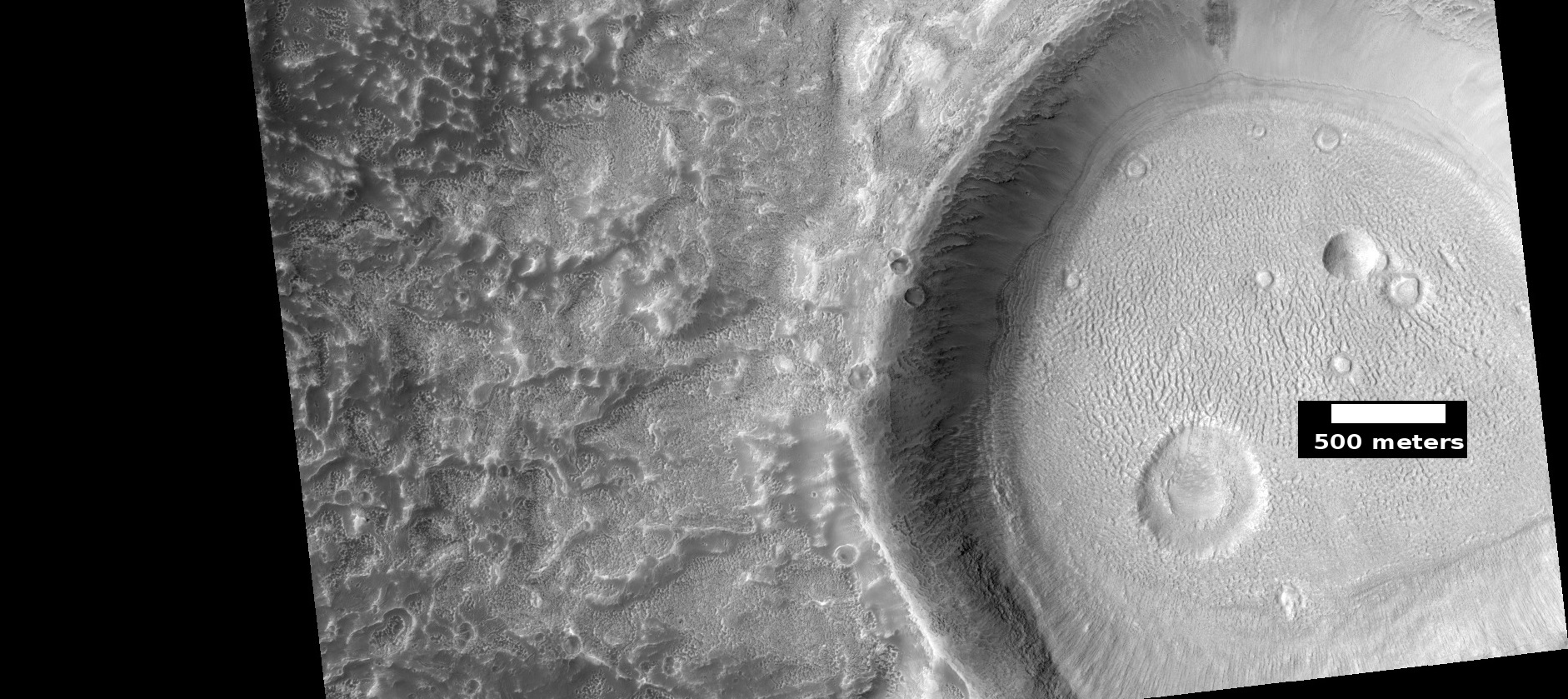
Wide view of ring-mold craters on floor of larger crater, as seen by HiRISE under HiWish program

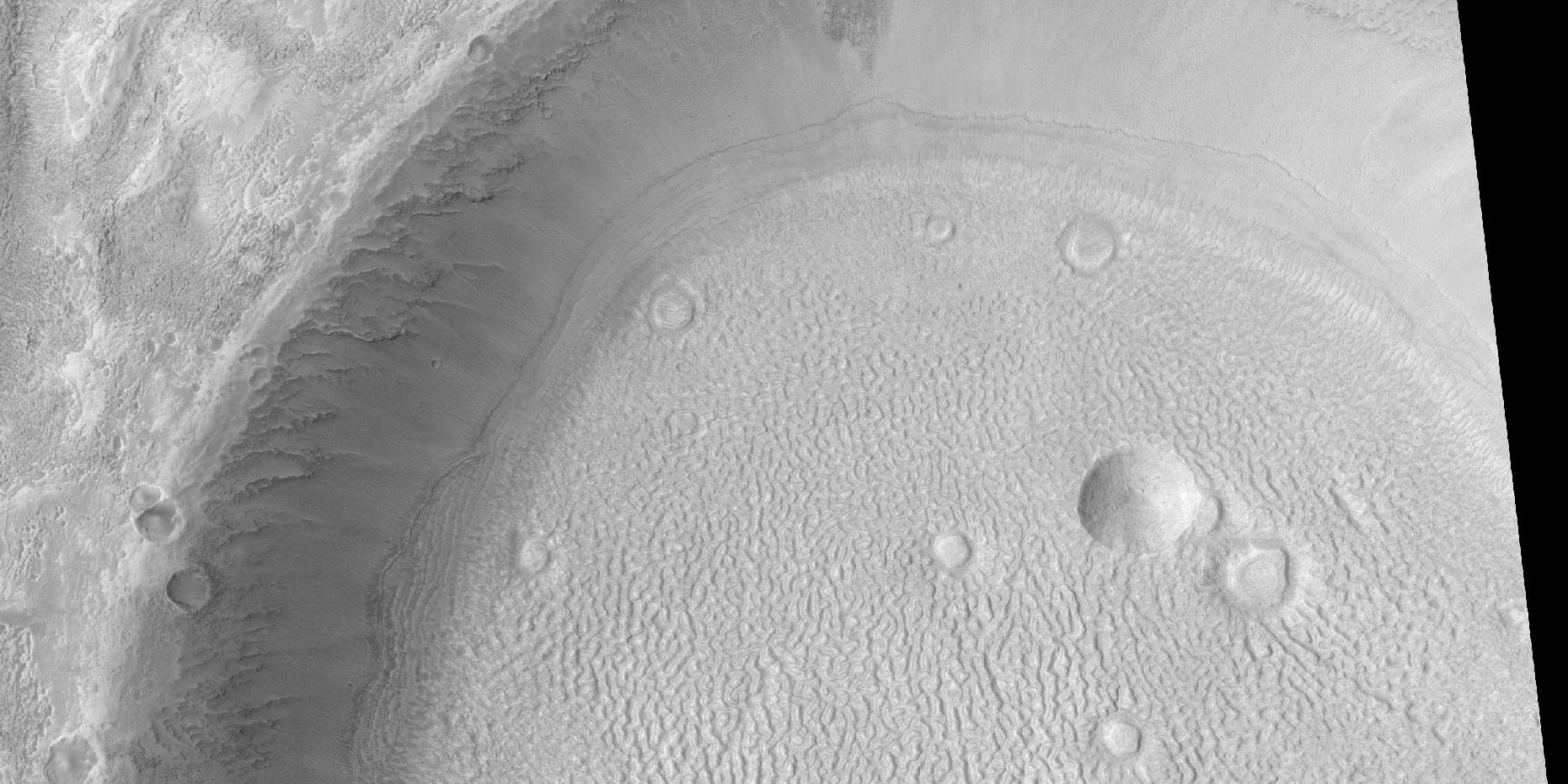
Ring-mold craters, as seen by HiRISE under HiWish program

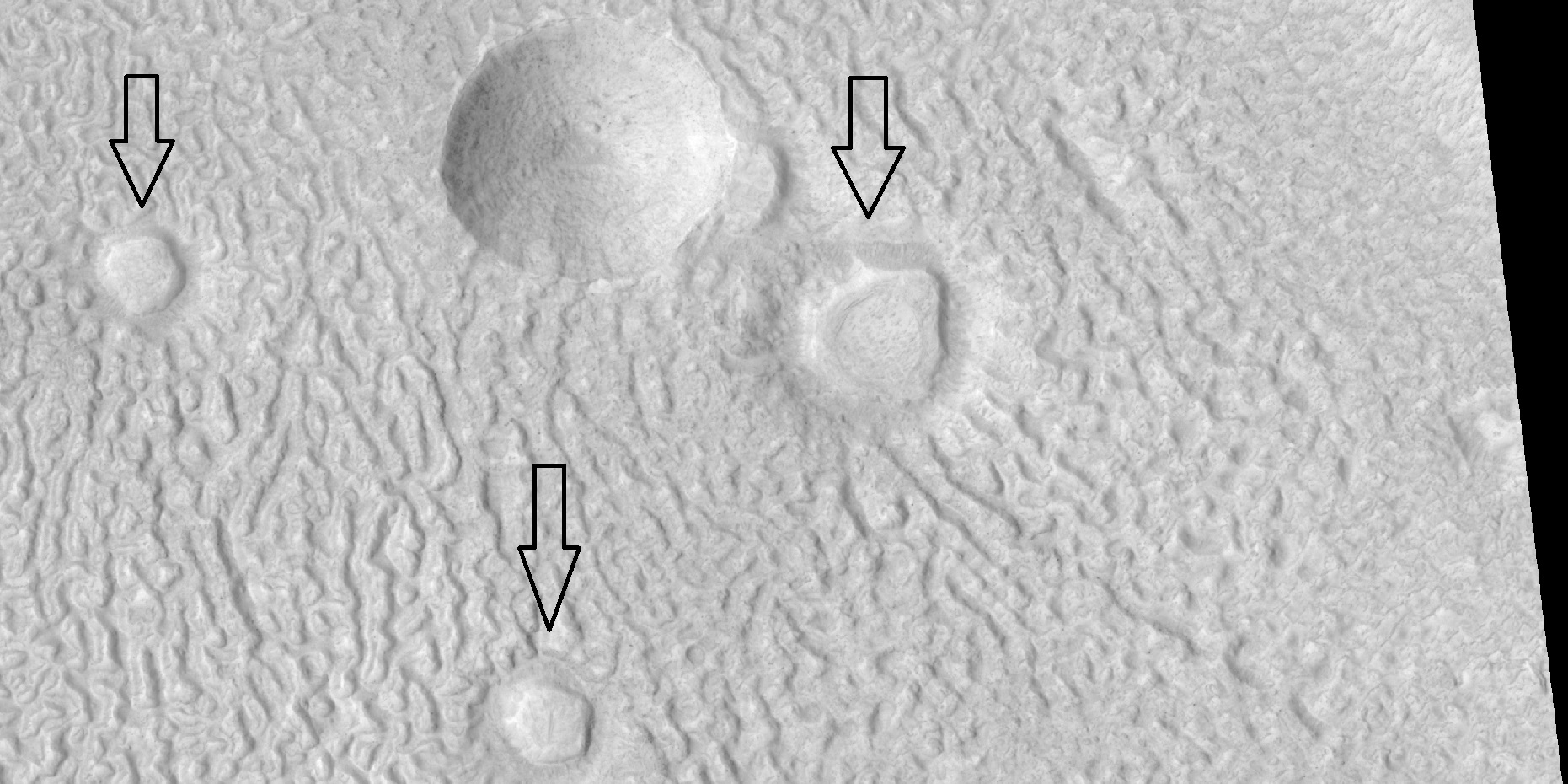
Close view of Ring-mold craters and brain terrain, as seen by HiRISE under HiWish program

Although cold and dry at present, Mars undergoes major climate changes in which snow and ice are deposited in certain regions. It has been known for some time that Mars undergoes many large changes in its tilt or obliquity because its two small moons lack the gravity to stabilize it, as the Moon stabilizes Earth; at times the tilt has even been greater than 80 degrees As a result of these climate changes layers of ice are created that when struck by an asteroid can form ring mold craters.

== See also ==
- Climate of Mars
- Concentric crater fill – Landform where the floor of a crater is mostly covered by parallel ridges
- Deuteronilus Mensae – Mensae on Mars
- Geology of Mars – Scientific study of the surface, crust, and interior of the planet Mars
- Glacier – Persistent body of ice that moves downhill under its own weight
- Glaciers on Mars – Extraterrestrial bodies of ice
- Ismenius Lacus quadrangle – Map of Mars
- Lobate debris apron – Geological features on Mars
- Water on Mars – Study of past and present water on Mars
