= Fast probability integration =

Fast probability integration (FPI) is a method of determining the probability of a class of events, particularly a failure event, that is faster to execute than Monte Carlo analysis. It is used where large numbers of time-variant variables contribute to the reliability of a system. The method was proposed by Wen and Chen in 1987.

For a simple failure analysis with one stress variable, there will be a time-variant failure barrier, $r(t)$, beyond which the system will fail. This simple case may have a deterministic solution, but for more complex systems, such as crack analysis of a large structure, there can be a very large number of variables, for instance, because of the large number of ways a crack can propagate. In many cases, it is infeasible to produce a deterministic solution even when the individual variables are all individually deterministic. In this case, one defines a probabilistic failure barrier surface, $\mathbf R (t)$, over the vector space of the stress variables.

If failure barrier crossings are assumed to comply with the Poisson counting process, an expression for maximum probable failure can be developed for each stress variable. The overall probability of failure is obtained by averaging (that is, integrating) over the entire variable vector space. FPI is a method of approximating this integral. The input to FPI is a time-variant expression, but the output is time-invariant, allowing it to be solved by first-order reliability method (FORM) or second-order reliability method (SORM).

An FPI package is included as part of the core modules of the NASA-designed NESSUS software. It was initially used to analyse risks and uncertainties concerning the Space Shuttle main engine, but is now used much more widely in a variety of industries.

== Bibliography ==
- Beck, André T.; Melchers, Robert E., "Fatigue and fracture reliability analysis under random loading", pp. 2201–2204 in, Bathe, K.J (ed), Proceedings of the Second MIT Conference on Computational Fluid and Solid Mechanics June 17–20, 2003, Elsevier, 2003 ISBN 008052947X.
- Murthy, Pappu L.N.; Mital, Subodh K.; Shah, Ashwin R., "Design tool developed for probabilistic modeling of ceramic matrix composite strength", pp. 127–128 in, Research & Technology 1998, NASA Lewis Research Center, 1999.
- Riha, David S.; Thacker, Ben H.; Huyse, Luc J.; Enright, Mike P.; Waldhart, Chris J.; Francis, W. Loren; Nicolella, Dniel P.; Hudak, Stephen J.; Liang, Wuwei; Fitch, Simeon H.K., "Applications of reliability assessment for aerospace, automotive, bioengineering, and weapons systems", ch. 1 in, Nikolaidis, Efstratios; Ghiocel, Dan M.; Singhal, Suren, Engineering Design Reliability Applications: For the Aerospace, Automotive and Ship Industries, CRC Press, 2007 ISBN 1420051334.
- Shah, A.R.; Shiao, M.C.; Nagpal, V.K.; Chamis, C.C., Probabilistic Evaluation of Uncertainties and Risks in Aerospace Components, NASA Technical Memorandum 105603, March 1992.
- Wen, Y.K.; Chen, H.C., "On fast integration for time variant structural reliability", Probabalistic Engineering Mechanics, vol. 2, iss. 3, pp. 156–162, September 1987.
