= Concentric crater fill =

Landform where the floor of a crater is mostly covered by parallel ridges

A concentric crater fill (CCF) is a landform where the floor of a crater is mostly covered with many parallel ridges. It is common in the mid-latitudes of Mars, and is widely believed to be caused by glacial movement. Areas on Mars called Deuteronilus Mensae and Protonilus Mensae contain many examples of concentric crater fill.

== Description ==
Concentric crater fill, like lobate debris aprons and lineated valley fill, is believed to be ice-rich. Sometimes boulders are found on concentric crater fill; it is believed they fell off the crater wall, then were transported away from the wall with the movement of the glacier. Erratics on Earth were carried by similar means.

High resolution pictures taken with HiRISE reveal that some of the surfaces of concentric crater fill are covered with strange patterns called closed-cell and open-cell brain terrain. The terrain resembles a human brain. It is believed to be caused by cracks in the surface accumulating dust and other debris, together with ice sublimating from some of the surfaces. The cracks are the result of stress from gravity and seasonal heating and cooling.

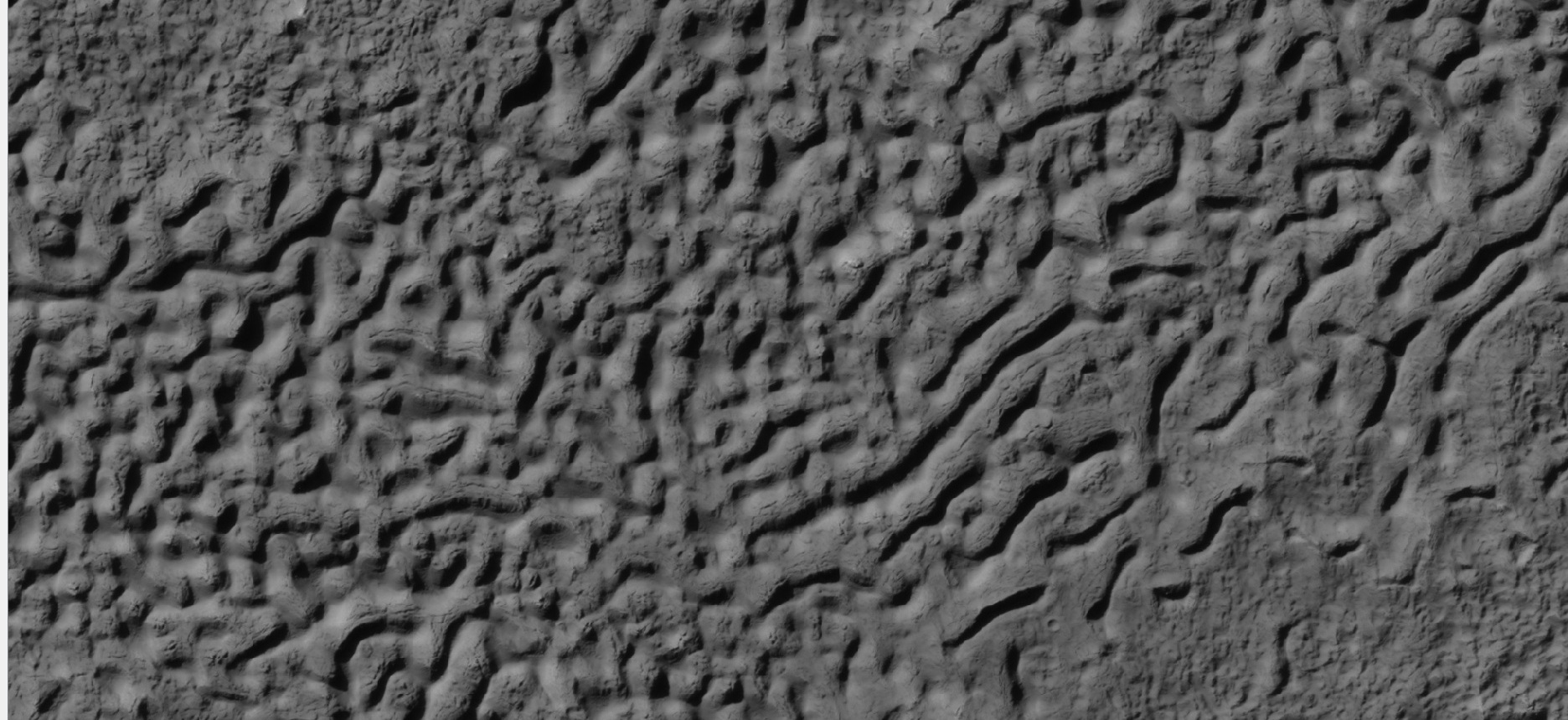
Closed-cell brain terrain, as seen by HiRISE under the HiWish program. This type of surface is common on lobate debris aprons, concentric crater fill, and lineated valley fill.

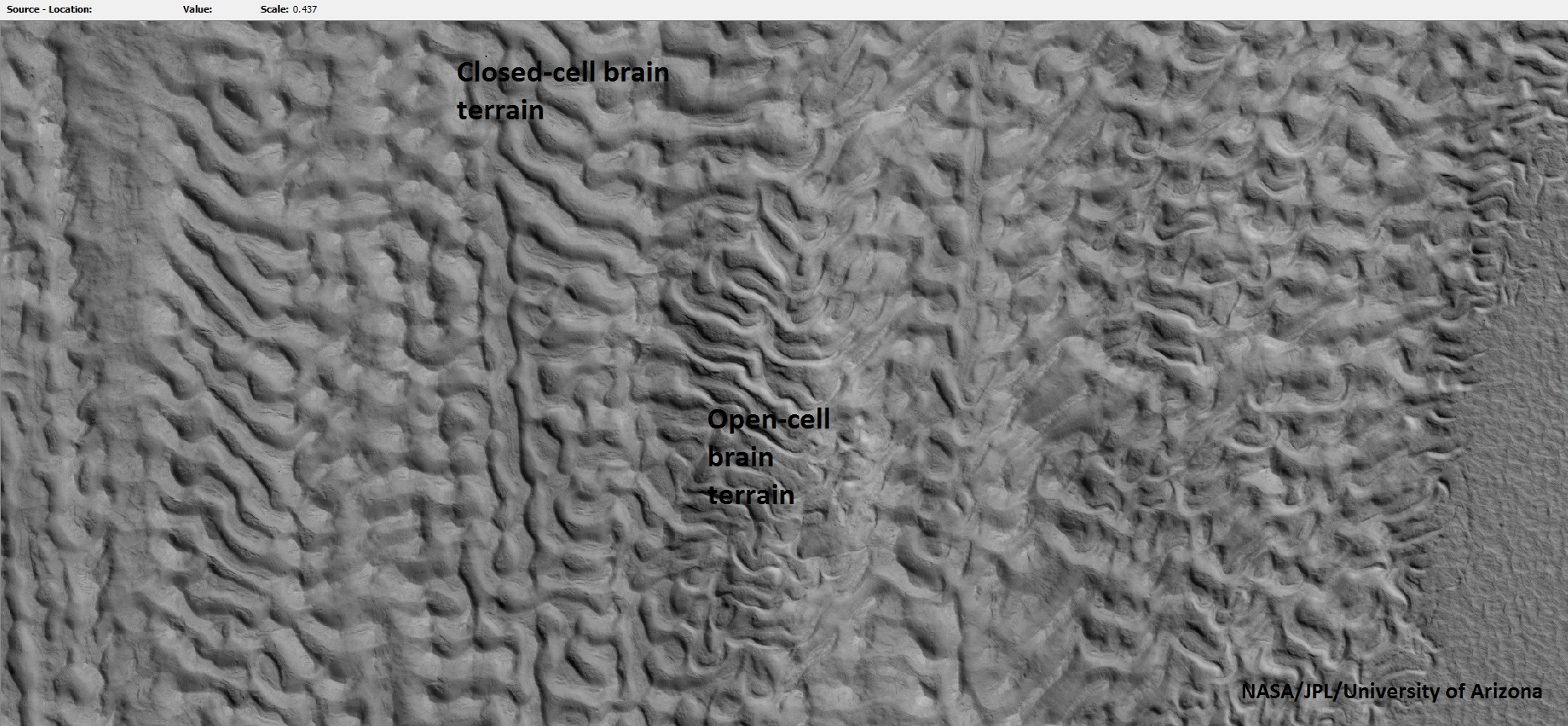
Open and closed-cell brain terrain, as seen by HiRISE, under HiWish program.
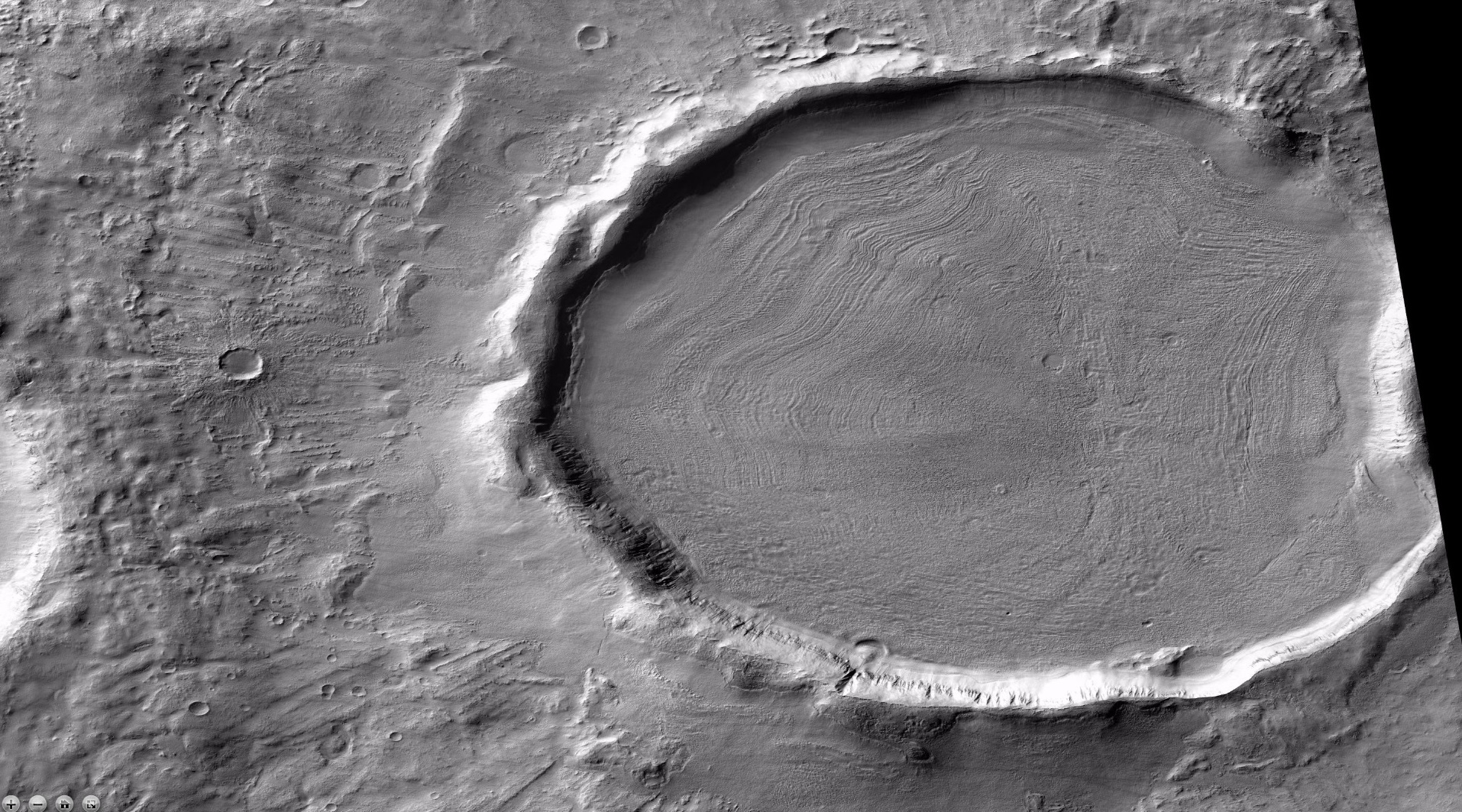
Crater showing concentric crater fill, as seen by CTX (on Mars Reconnaissance Orbiter). Location is Phaethontis quadrangle.

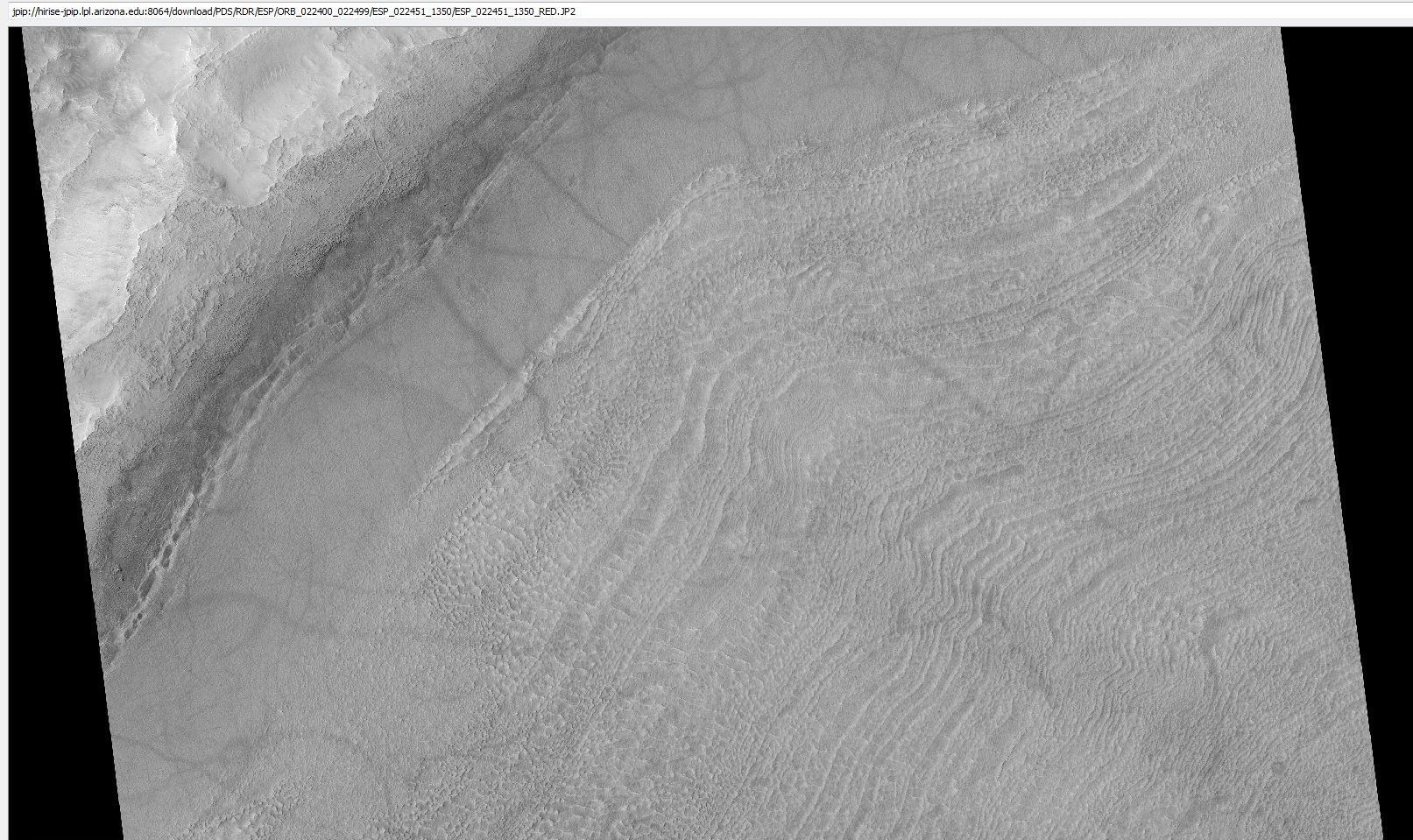
Close-up view of concentric crater fill, as seen by HiRISE under HiWish program Note: this is an enlargement of previous image of a concentric crater. Location is Phaethontis quadrangle.

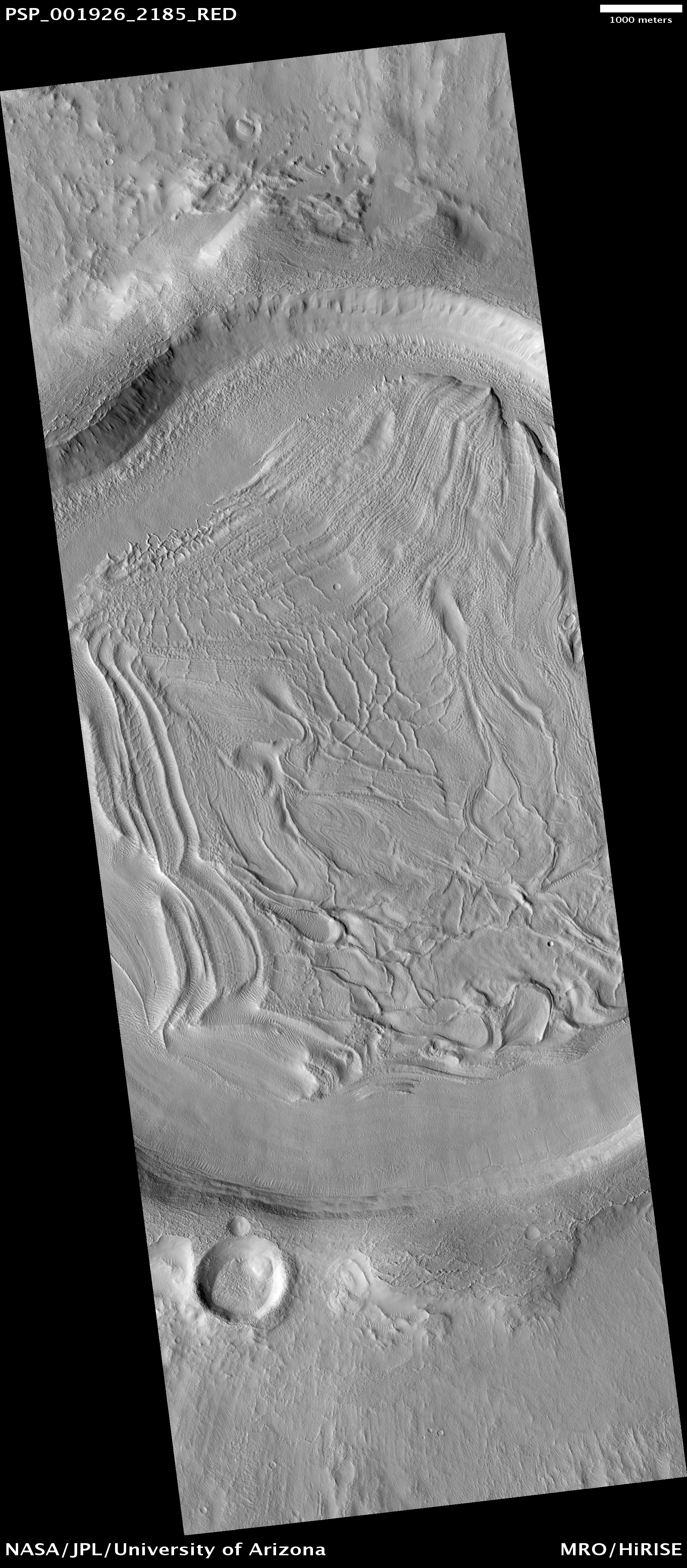
Wide-view of concentric crater fill, as seen by HiRISE. Location is the Casius quadrangle.

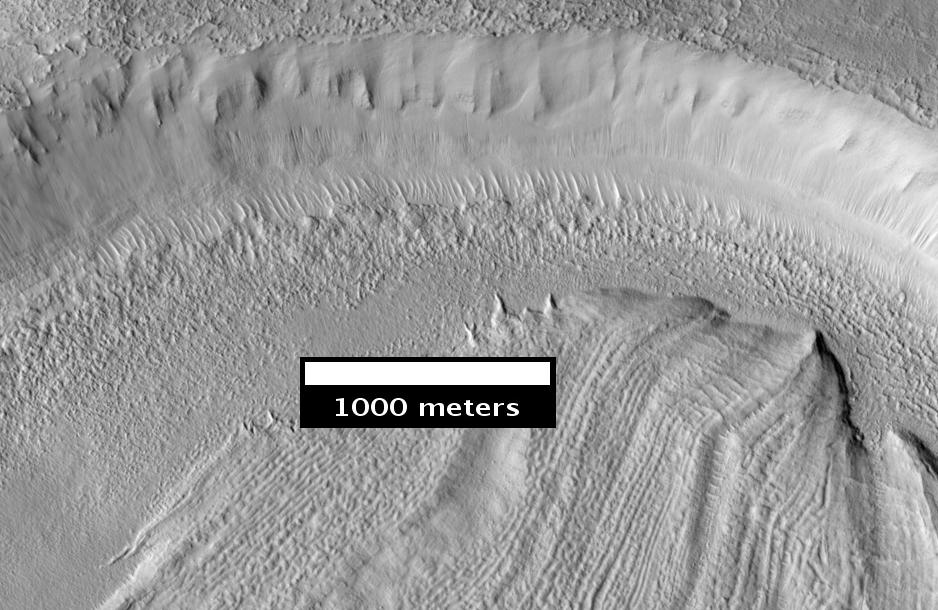
Concentric Crater Fill Close-up of near the top of previous image. The surface debris covers water ice.

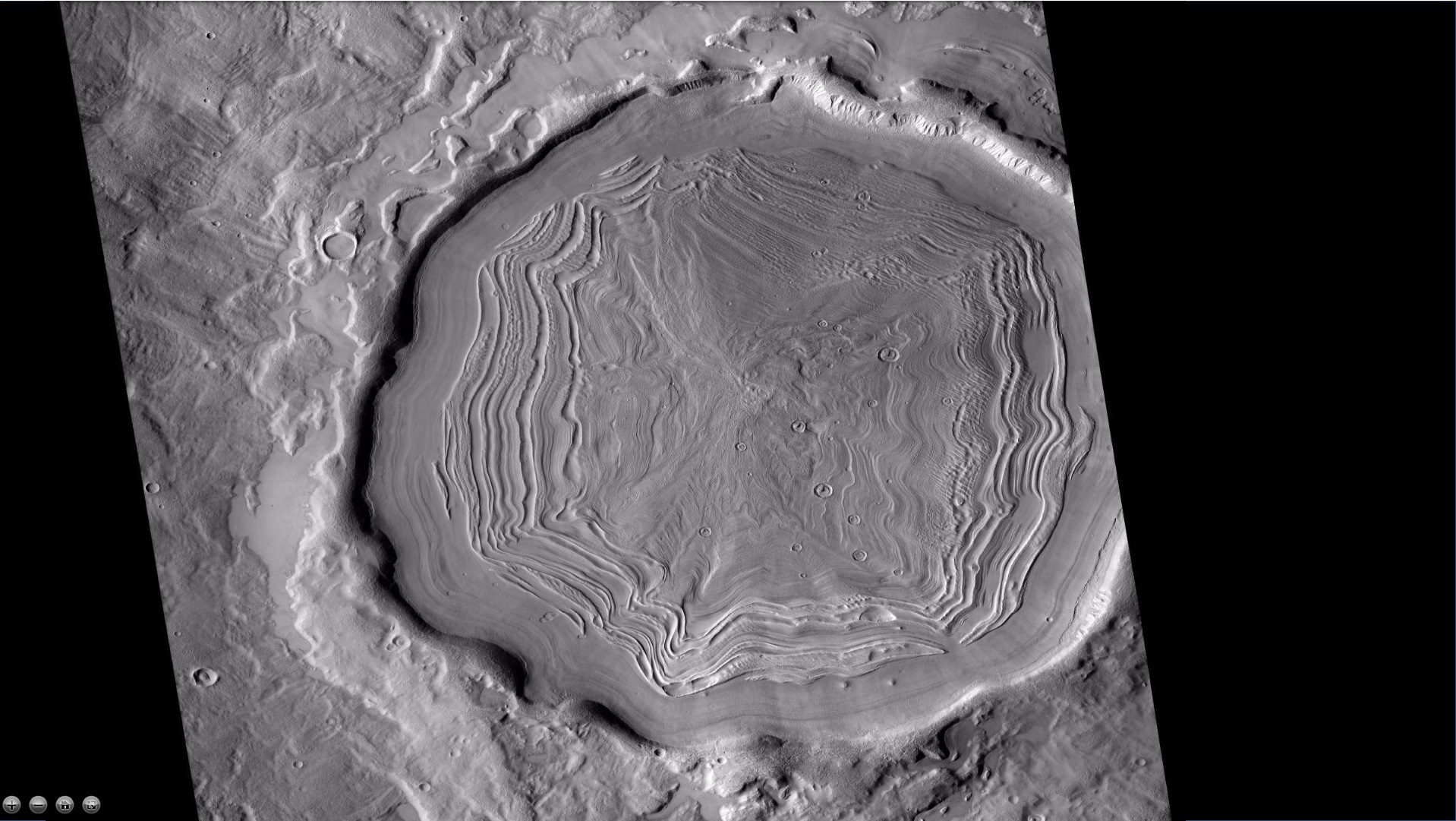
Crater with concentric crater fill, as seen by CTX (on Mars Reconnaissance Orbiter). Location is Casius quadrangle.

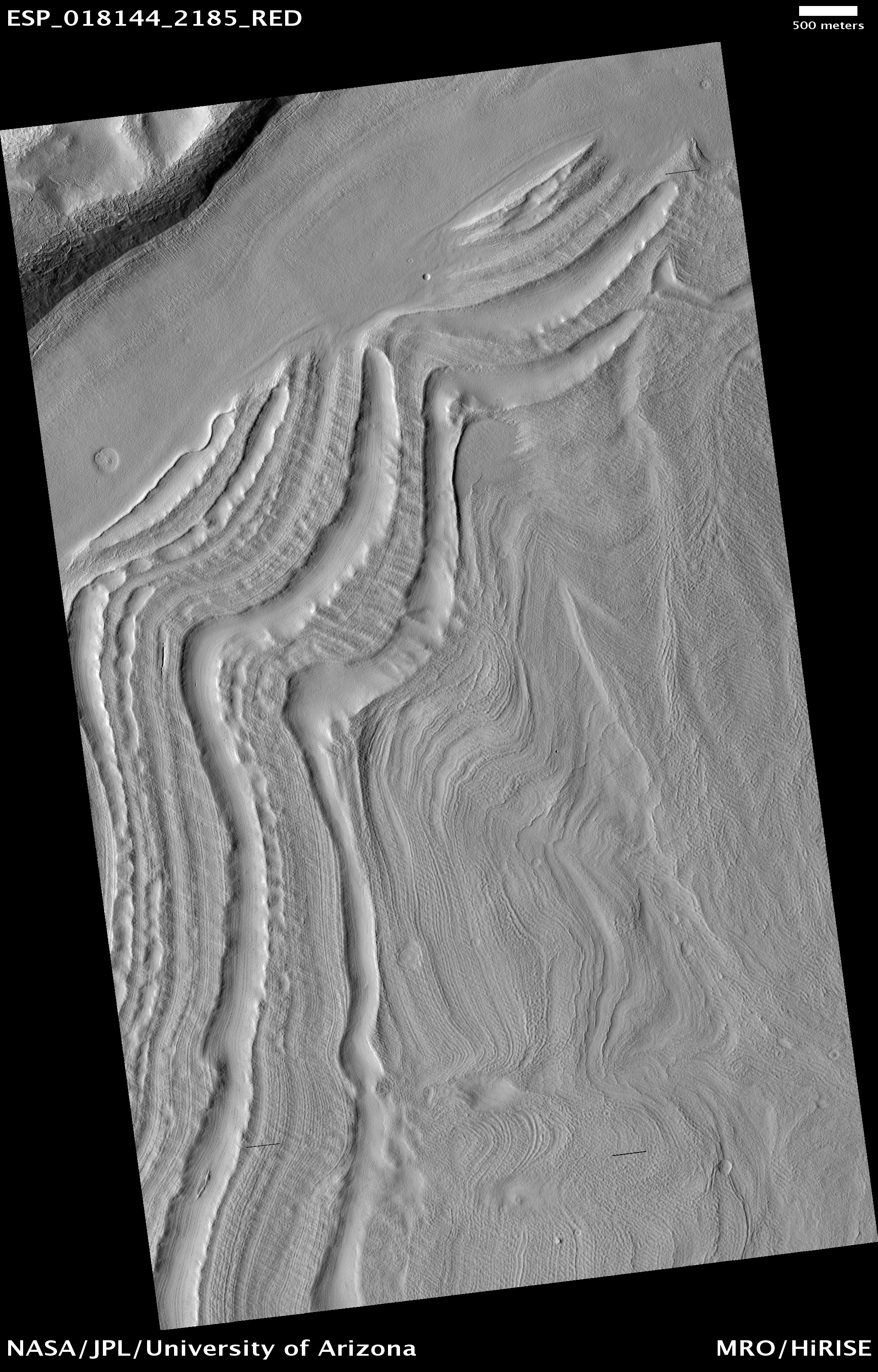
Well-developed hollows, as seen by HiRISE under the HiWish program. Location is the Casius quadrangle. Note: this is an enlargement of the previous image that was taken by CTX.

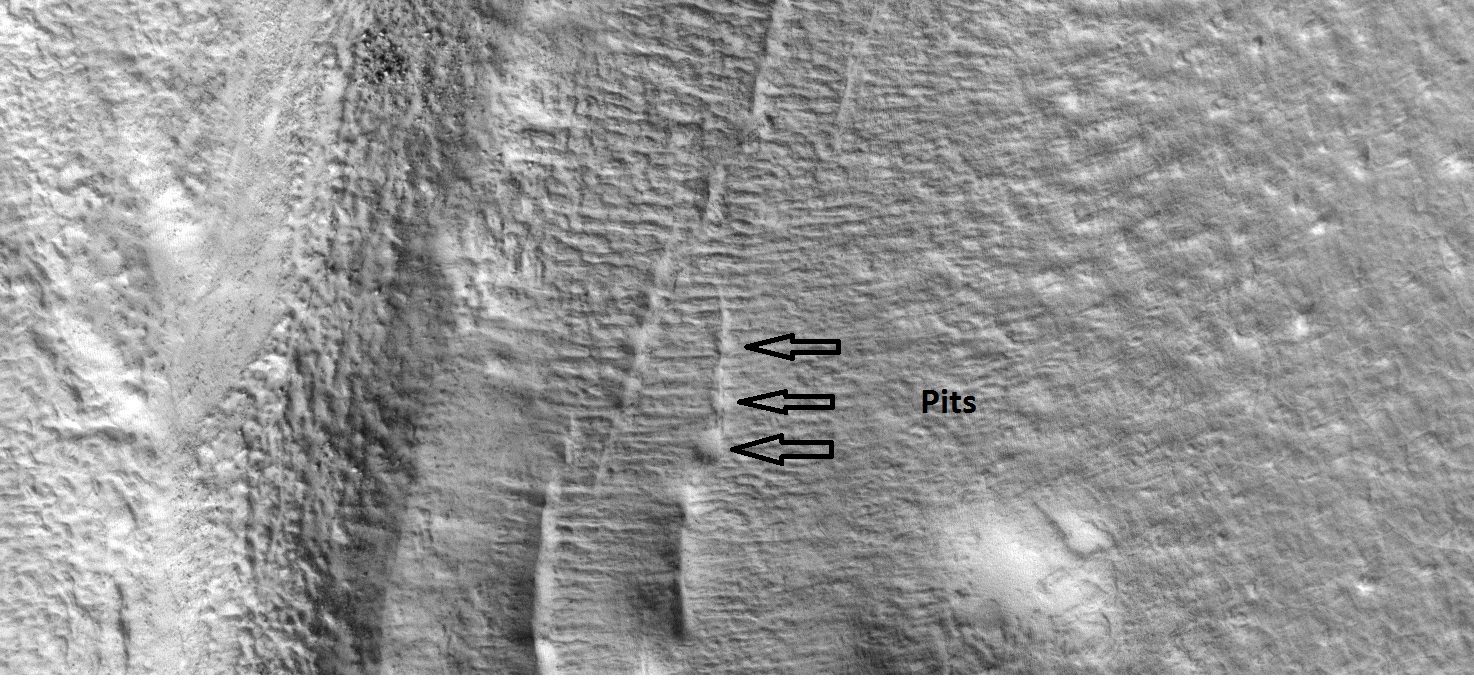
Close-up showing cracks containing pits on the floor of a crater, as seen by HiRISE under HiWish program. Cracks may start as a line of pits that enlarge, and then join. Location is the Casius quadrangle.

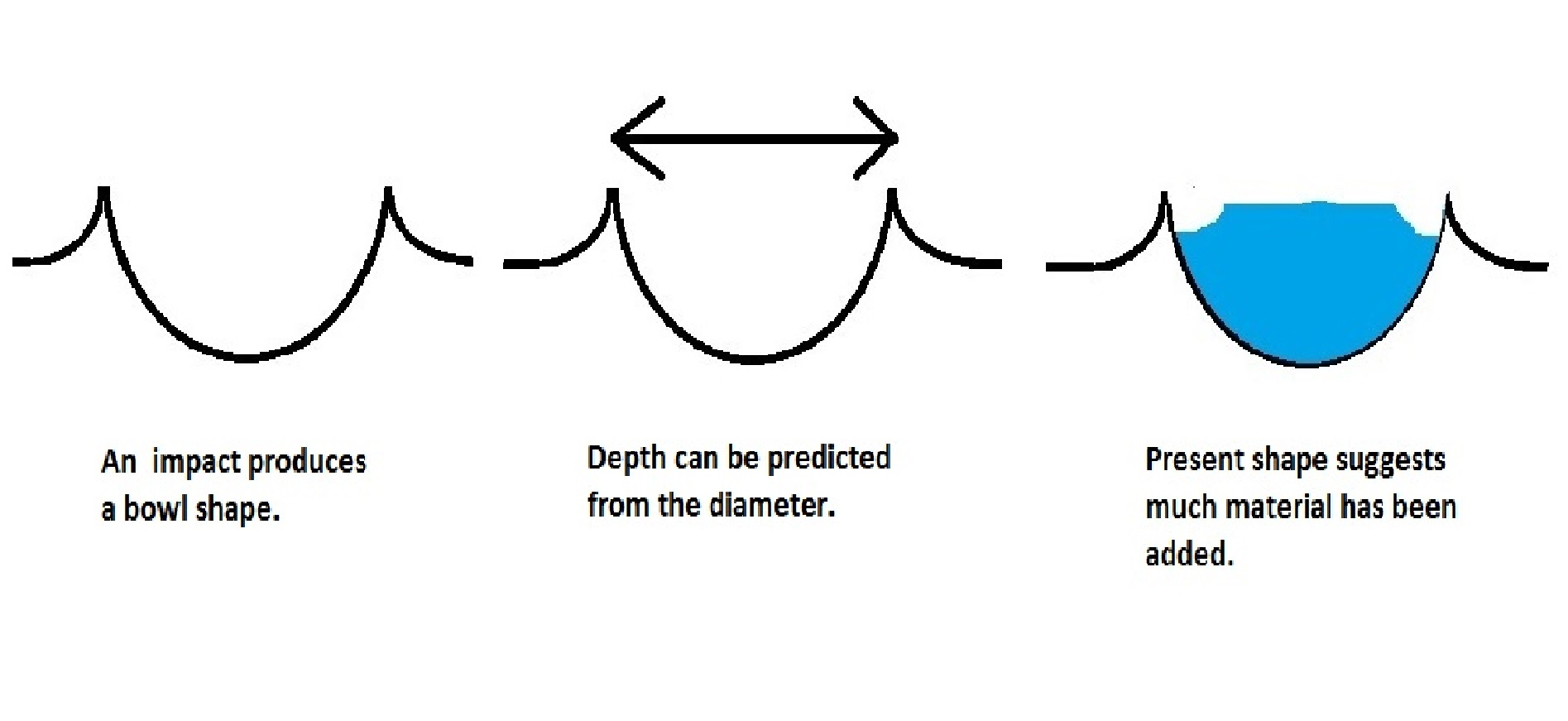
This series of drawings illustrates why researchers believe many craters are full of ice-rich material. The depth of craters can be predicted based upon the observed diameter. Many craters are almost full, rather than bowl-shaped; hence it is believed that material has accumulated within the bowls in the time since they were formed by impact. Much of the extra material is believed to be ice that fell from the sky as snow or ice-coated dust.
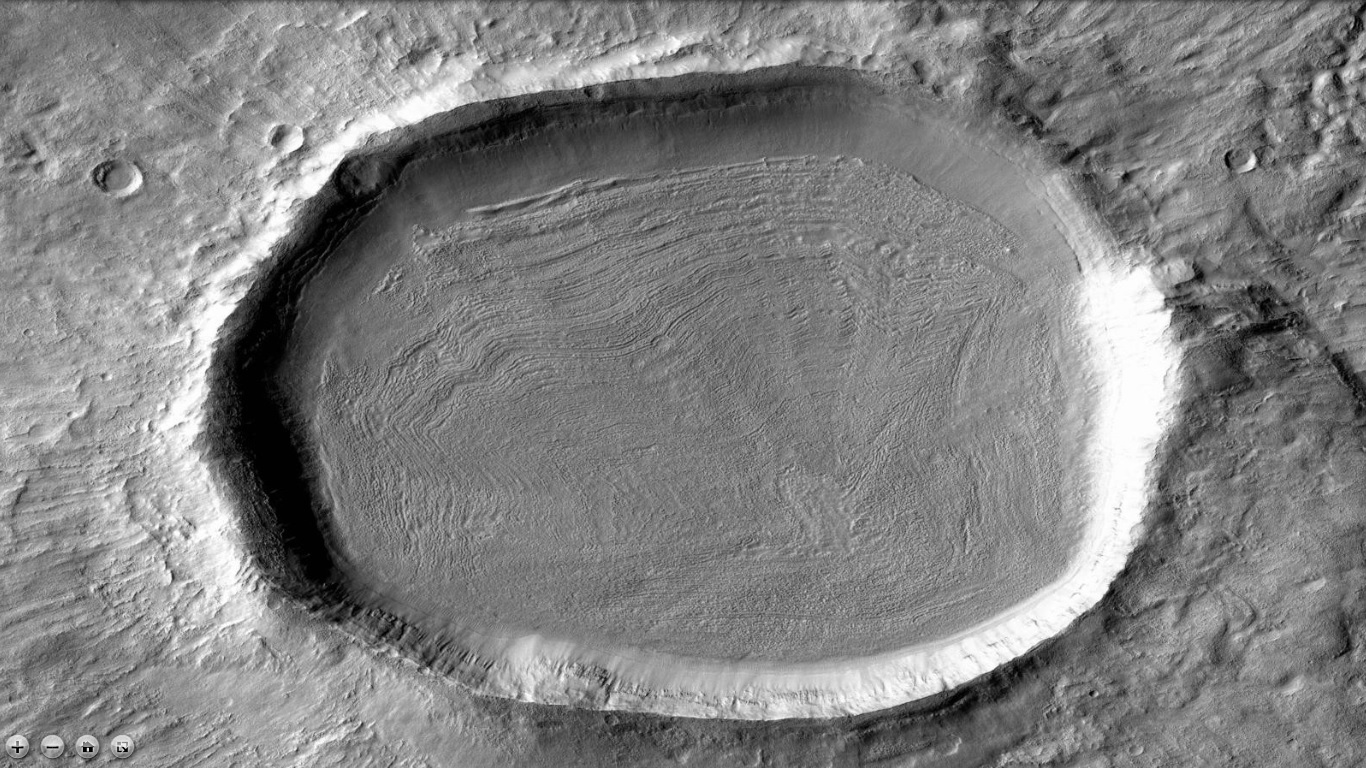
Concentric crater fill, as seen by HiRISE under HiWish program. Location is the Phaethontis quadrangle.

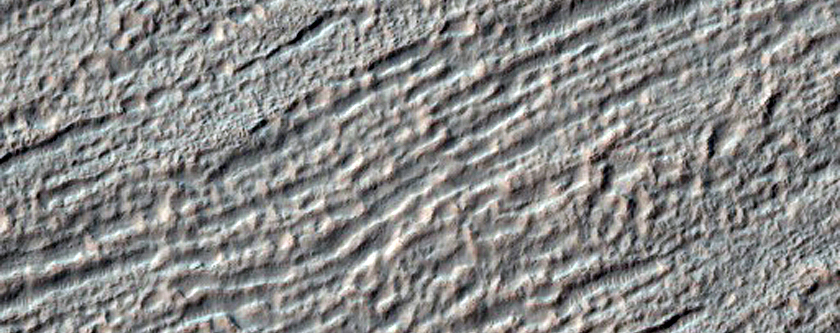
Close, color view of concentric crater fill, as seen by HiRISE under HiWish program Location is the Phaethontis quadrangle.

== See also ==
- Casius quadrangle – Map of Mars
- Climate of Mars
- Deuteronilus Mensae – Mensae on Mars
- Fretted terrain – Surface feature common to certain areas of Mars
- Impact crater – Circular depression in a solid astronomical body formed by the impact of a smaller object
- Glacier – Persistent body of ice that moves downhill under its own weight
- Glaciers on Mars – Extraterrestrial bodies of ice
- Protonilus Mensae – Martian plain
- Water on Mars – Study of past and present water on Mars
