= Cerulli =

Cerulli may refer to:

- Vincenzo Cerulli (1859–1927), Italian astronomer and founder of the Collurania-Teramo Observatory in Teramo
- Enrico Cerulli (1898–1988), Italian scholar of Somali and Ethiopian studies
- Cerulli (crater), crater in the Ismenius Lacus quadrangle on Mars
