= Cerulli (crater) =

Crater on Mars

Crater characteristics
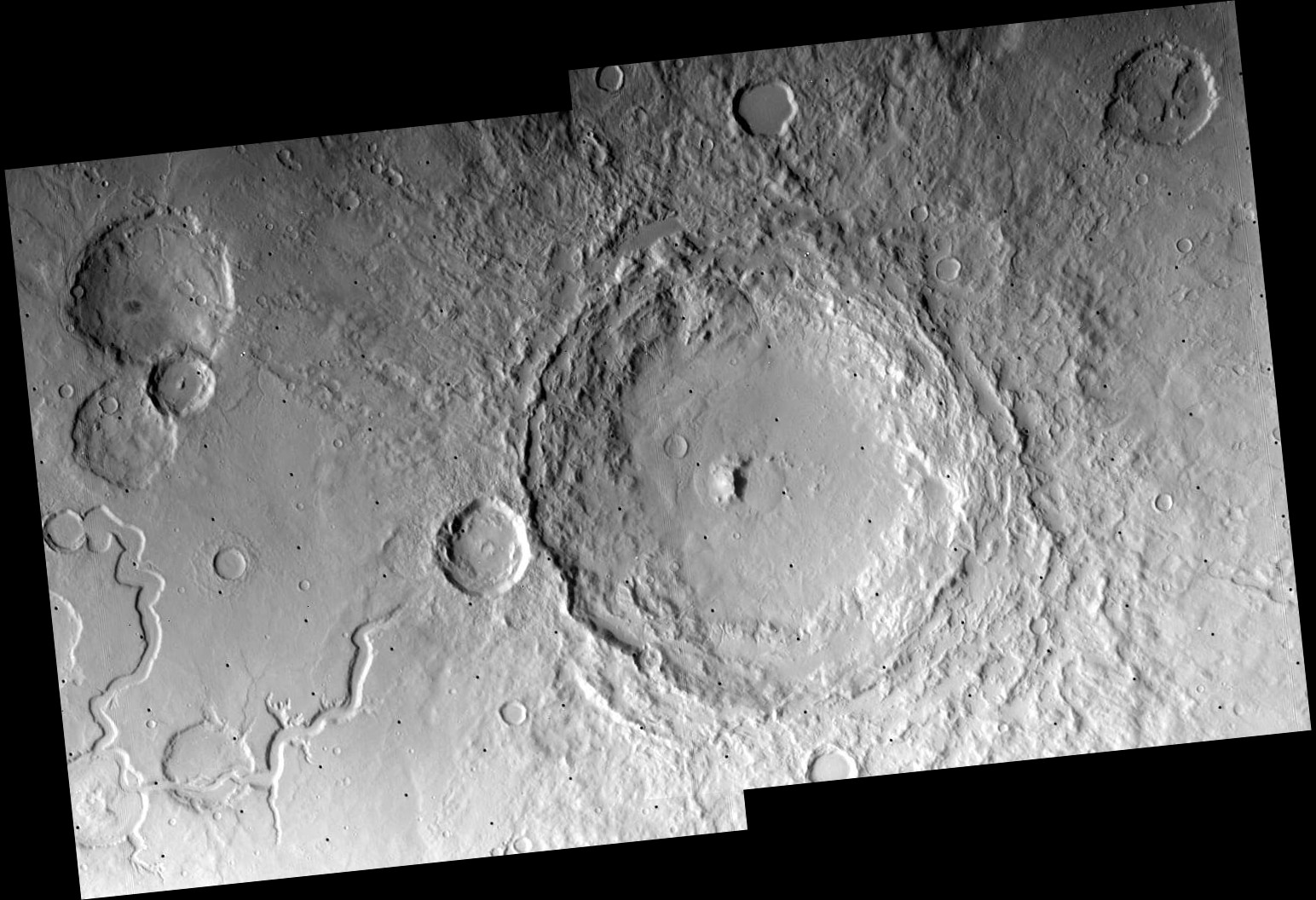
- Viking Orbiter 1 mosaic
- Planet: Mars
- Coordinates: 32.5°N 337.9°W
- Quadrangle: Ismenius Lacus
- Diameter: 130 km (81 mi)
- Eponym: Vicenzo Cerulli, an Italian astronomer (1859-1927)

Cerulli is a crater in the Ismenius Lacus quadrangle on Mars with a diameter of 130 km. It lies in the northern hemisphere south of the very large crater Lyot. It is named after Vincenzo Cerulli, an Italian astronomer (1859–1927).

Impact craters generally have a rim with ejecta around them; in contrast, volcanic craters usually do not have a rim or ejecta deposits. As craters get larger (greater than 10 km in diameter) they usually have a central peak. The peak is caused by a rebound of the crater floor following the impact. If one measures the diameter of a crater, the original depth can be estimated with various ratios. Because of this relationship, researchers have found that many Martian craters contain a great deal of material; much of it is believed to be ice deposited when the climate was different. Sometimes, craters expose layers that were buried. Cerulli shows evidence of glacial activity in the past. The density of impact craters is used to determine the surface ages of Mars and other solar system bodies. The older the surface, the more craters present. Crater shapes can reveal the presence of ground ice.

The area around craters may be rich in minerals. On Mars, heat from the impact melts ice in the ground. Water from the melting ice dissolves minerals, and then deposits them in cracks or faults that were produced with the impact. This process, called hydrothermal alteration, is a major way in which ore deposits are produced. The area around Martian craters may be rich in useful ores for the future colonization of Mars.

== Gallery ==
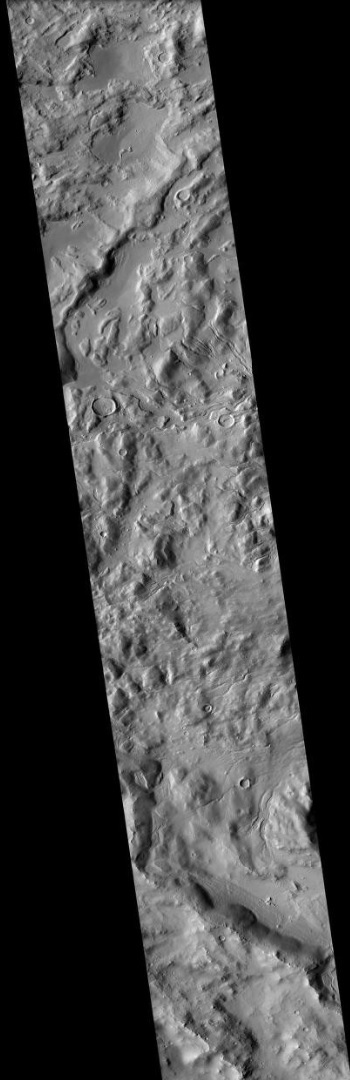
West side of Cerulli crater, as seen by CTX camera on MRO.

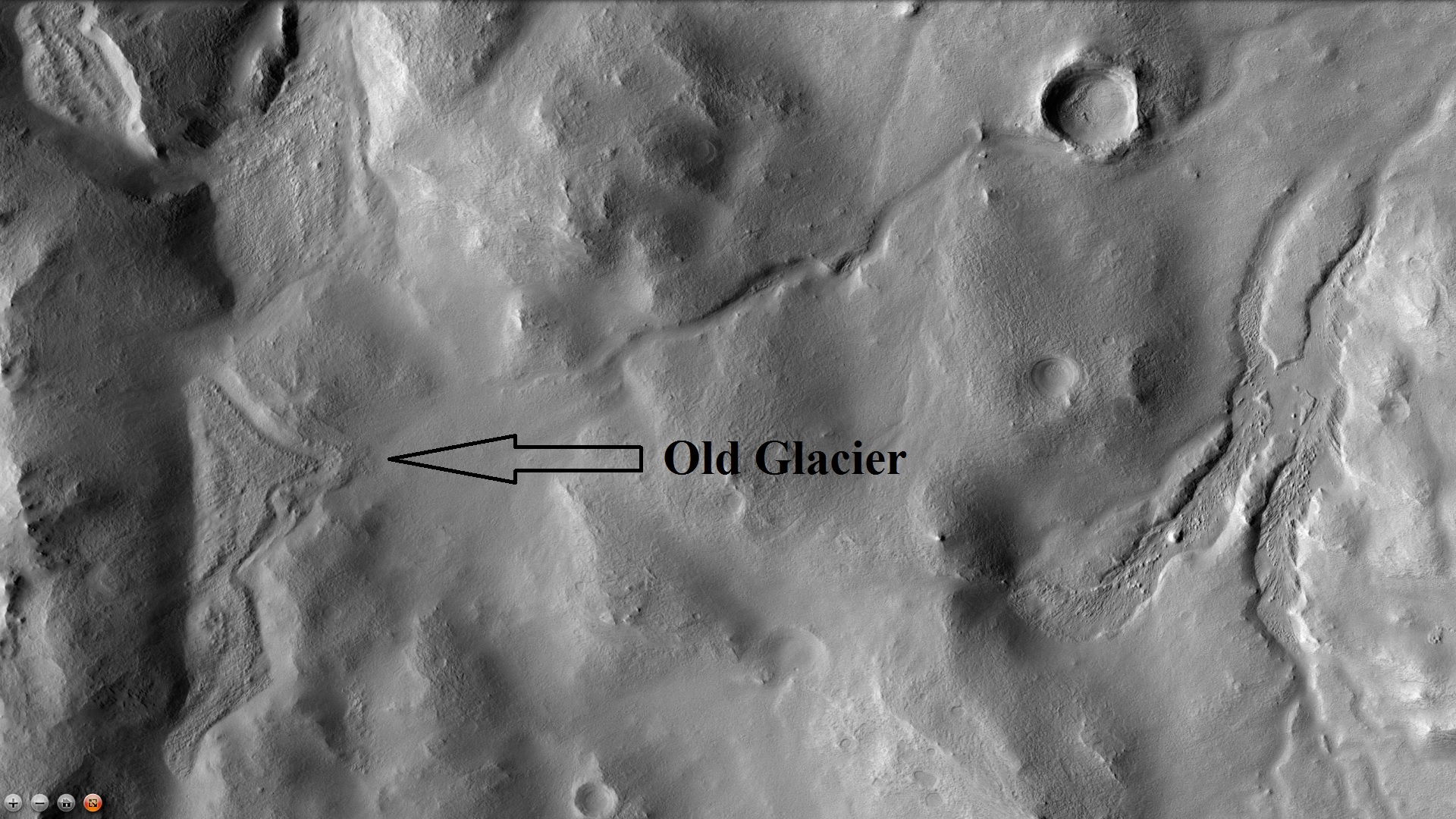
Remains of ancient glacier on western wall of Cerulli crater, as seen by CTX camera. Note: this is an enlargement of previous image.

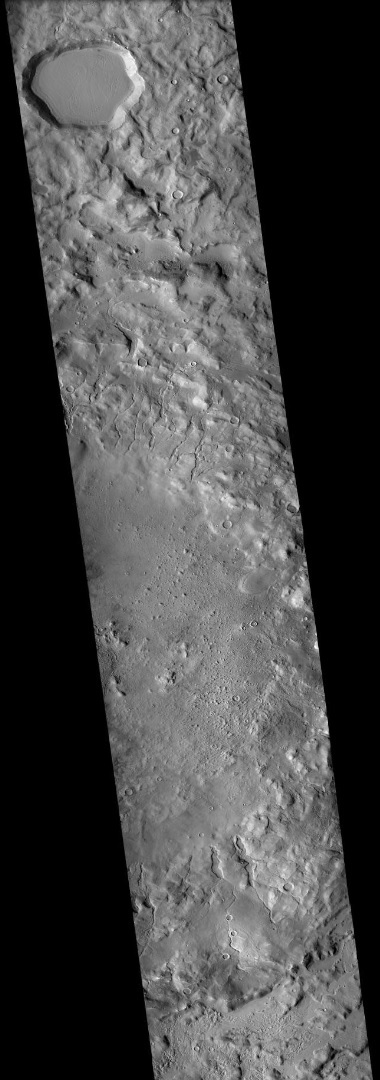
East side of Cerulli crater, as seen by CTX camera.

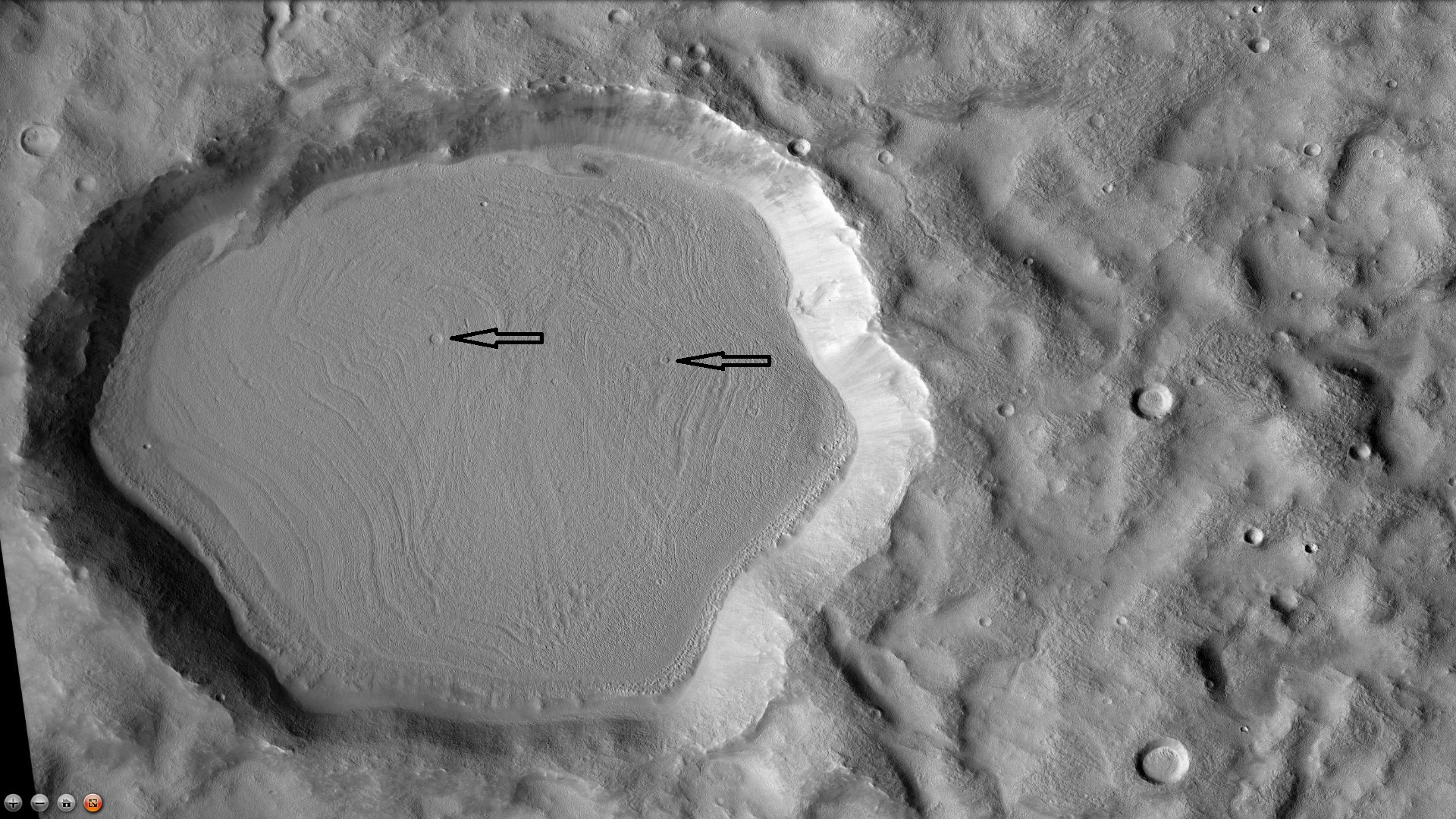
Unnamed crater north of Cerulli, as seen by CTX camera. Floor is covered in "brain terrain." Arrows point to ring mold craters. Note: this is an enlargement of previous image.

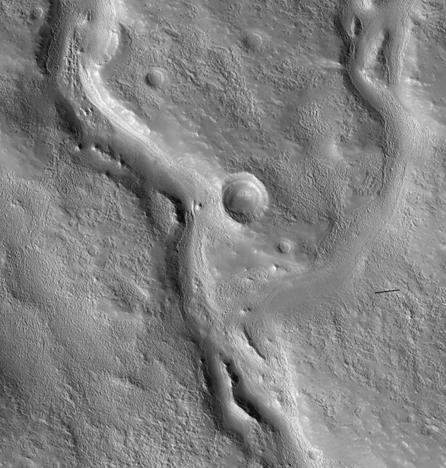
Valleys on the ejecta blanket of Cerulli, as seen by HiRISE.

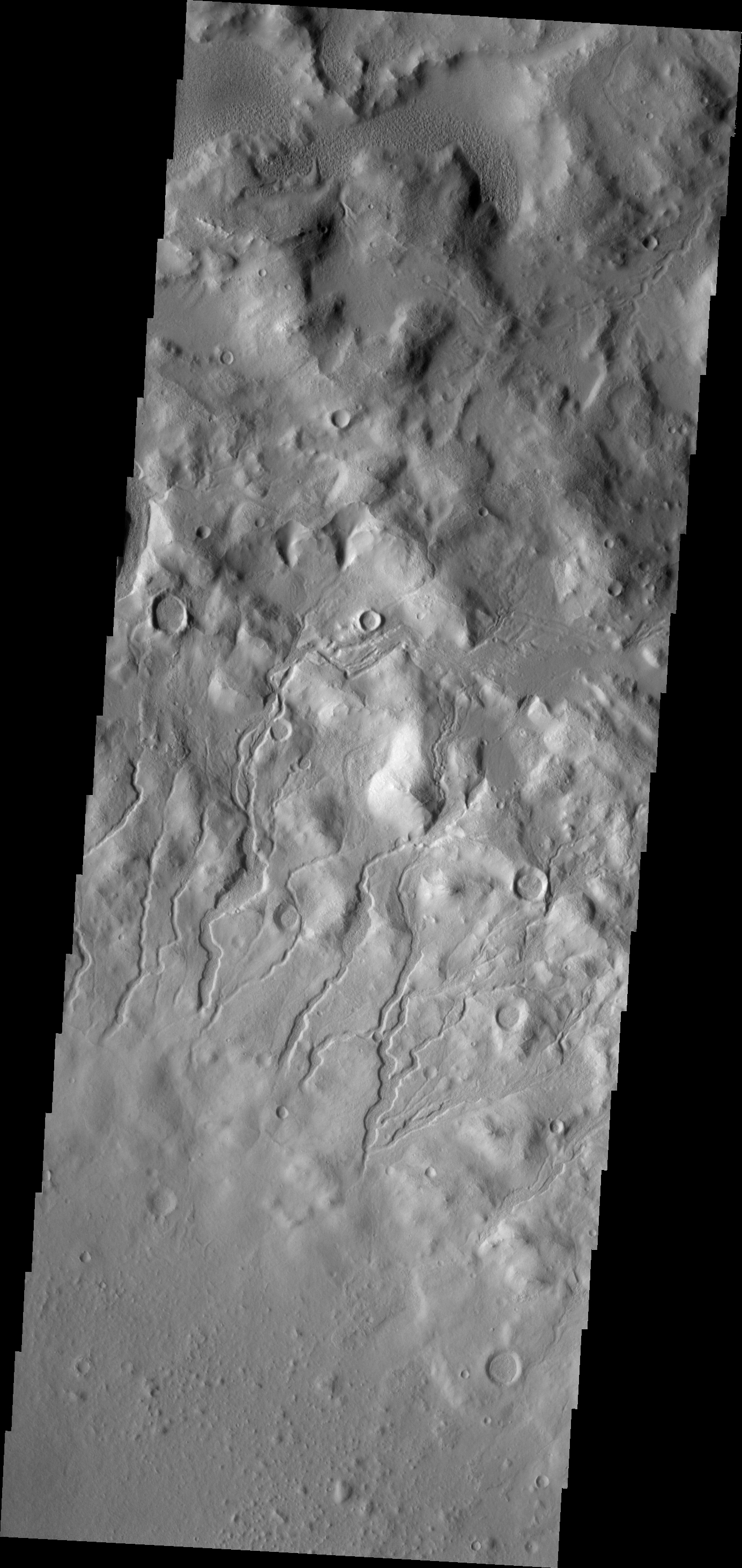
Cerulli crater channels, as seen by THEMIS. Channels are on the inner north rim of the crater.

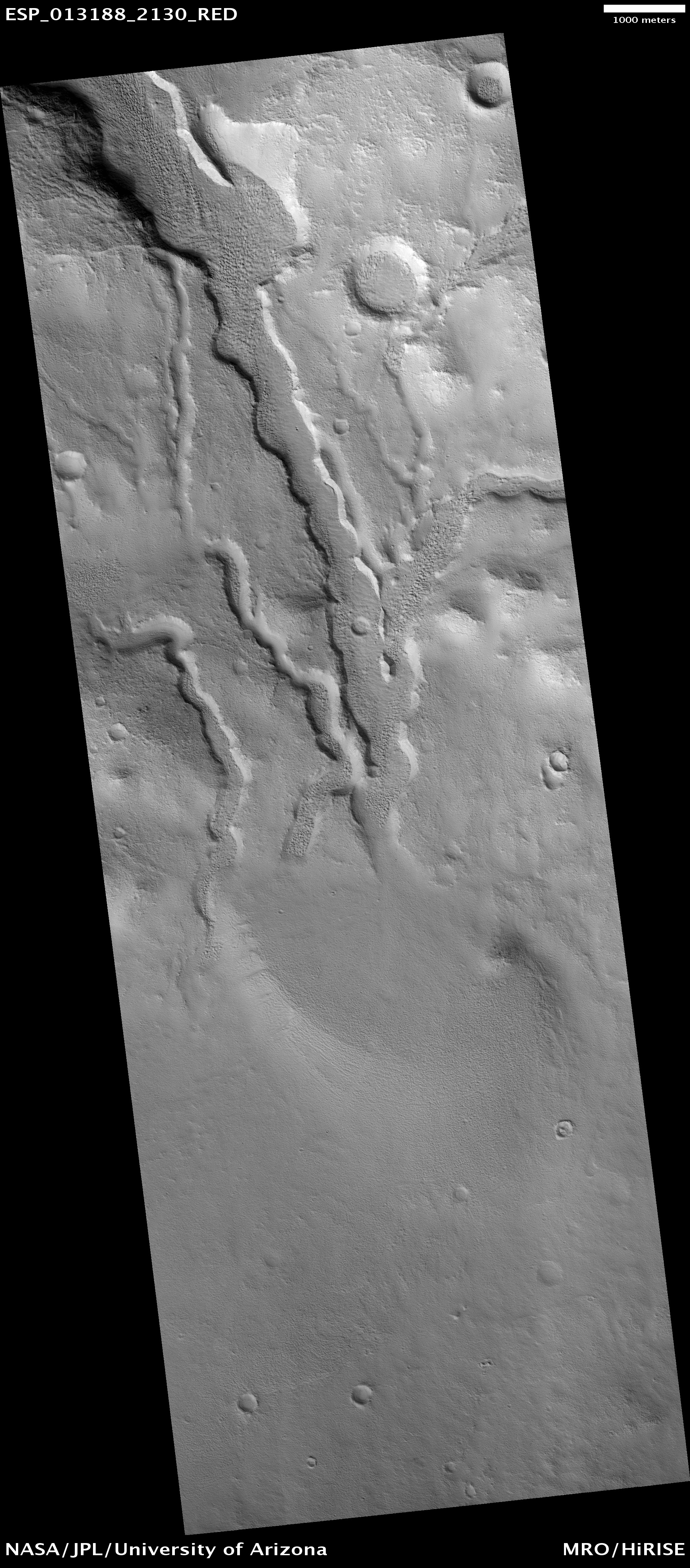
Cerulli crater, as seen by HiRISE.

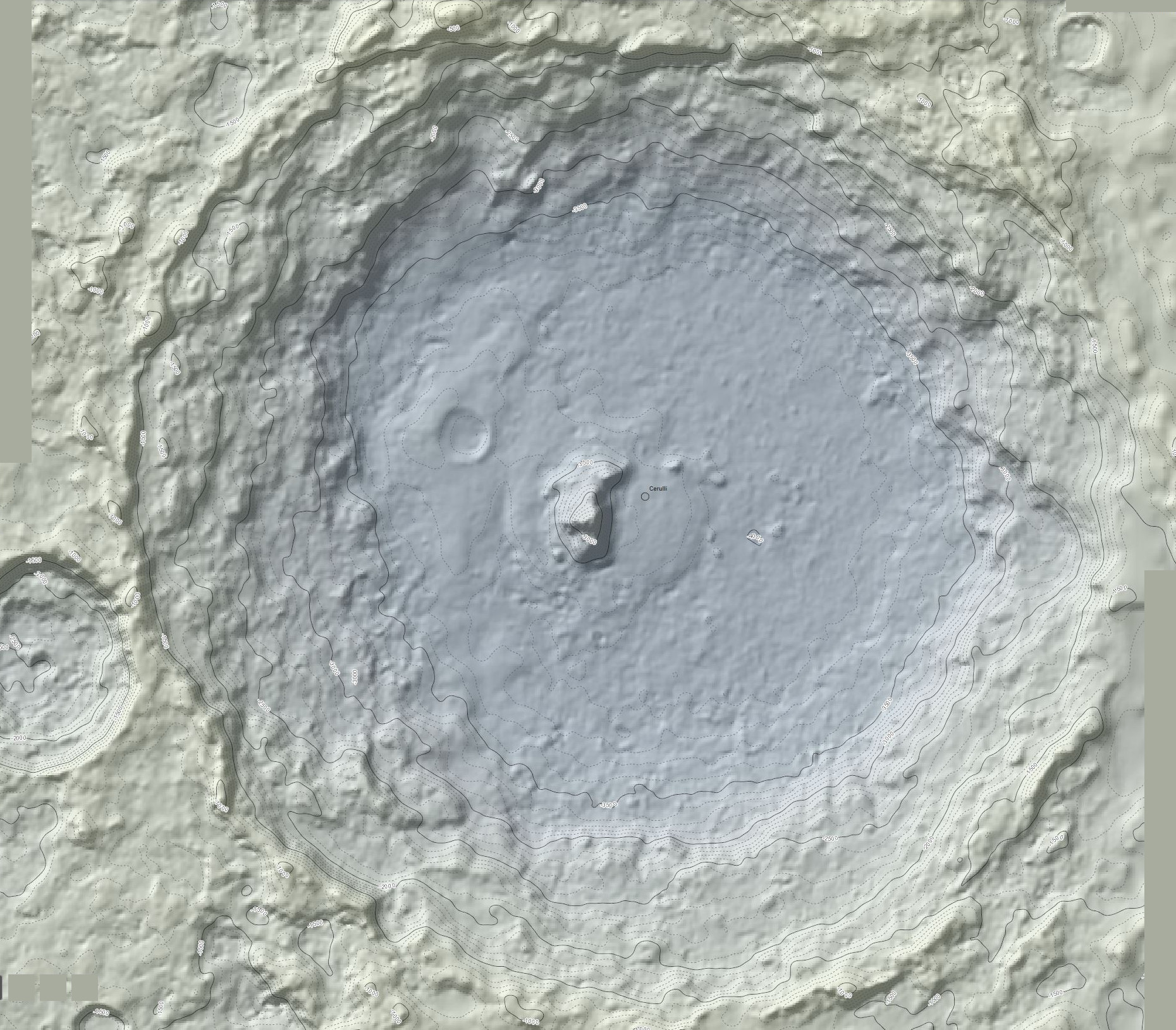
This topographic map was created using Mars Orbiter Laser Altimeter (MOLA) technology on the Mars Global Surveyor spacecraft.

== See also ==
- Climate of Mars
- Fretted terrain
- Glacier
- Glaciers on Mars
- Impact crater
- Impact event
- Ismenius Lacus quadrangle
- List of craters on Mars
- Ore resources on Mars
- Planetary nomenclature
- Water on Mars
