= 366 Vincentina =

Main-belt asteroid

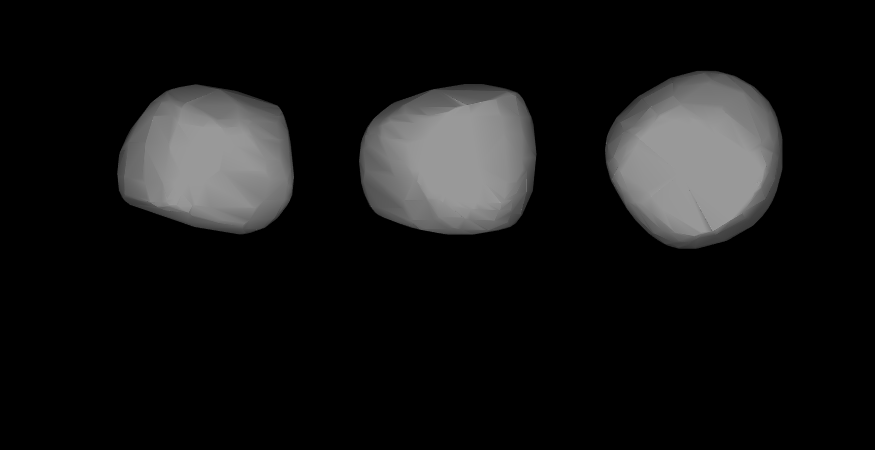
- Lightcurve-base 3D-model of 366 Vincentina.

Discovery
- Discovered by: Auguste Charlois
- Discovery date: 21 March 1893

Designations
- Named after: Vincenzo Cerulli
- Alternative designations: 1893 W; A909 BN; 1931 AS
- Minor planet category: Main belt

Orbital characteristics
- Epoch 31 July 2016 (JD 2457600.5)
- Uncertainty parameter 0
- Observation arc: 118.13 yr (43147 d)
- Aphelion: 3.31800 AU (496.366 Gm)
- Perihelion: 2.97001 AU (444.307 Gm)
- Semi-major axis: 3.14400 AU (470.336 Gm)
- Eccentricity: 0.055342
- Orbital period (sidereal): 5.57 yr (2036.2 d)
- Mean anomaly: 283.472°
- Mean motion: 0° 10^{m} 36.476^{s} / day
- Inclination: 10.5798°
- Longitude of ascending node: 346.728°
- Argument of perihelion: 332.371°

Physical characteristics
- Dimensions: 92±6 km 87+14 −6 km
- Mass: (7.3±2.7)×10^{17} kg (Note: Calculated from its standard gravitational parameter GM = 0.049±0.018 km^{3}/s^{2}.)
- Mean density: 2.15 g/cm^{3} (Note: Assuming a diameter of 86.4 km.)
- Synodic rotation period: 12.7365 h (0.53069 d)
- Geometric albedo: 0.0800±0.006
- Absolute magnitude (H): 8.7

366 Vincentina is a fairly large main belt asteroid.

Vincentina was discovered on 21 March 1893 by Auguste Charlois, and named after Vincenzo Cerulli, an Italian astronomer.
