= Coloe Fossae =

Fossae on Mars

Coloe Fossae is a set of troughs in the Ismenius Lacus quadrangle of Mars.

== Location and description ==
It is centered at 36.5 degrees north latitude and 302.9 west longitude. It is 576 km long and was named after a classical albedo feature.

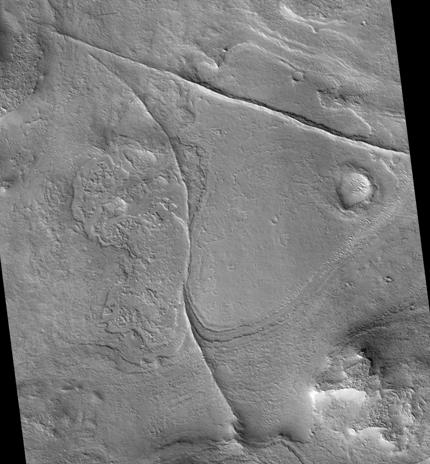
Coloe Fossae Dikes and/or faults, as seen by HiRISE. Dikes and faults may have produced mineral deposits.

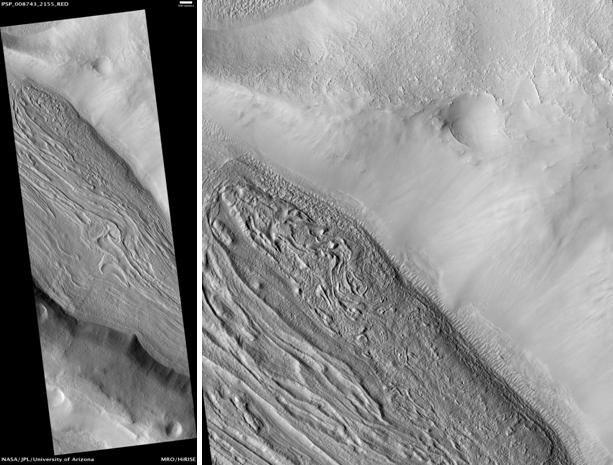
Coloe Fossae lineated valley fill, as seen by HiRISE. Scale bar is 500 meters long.

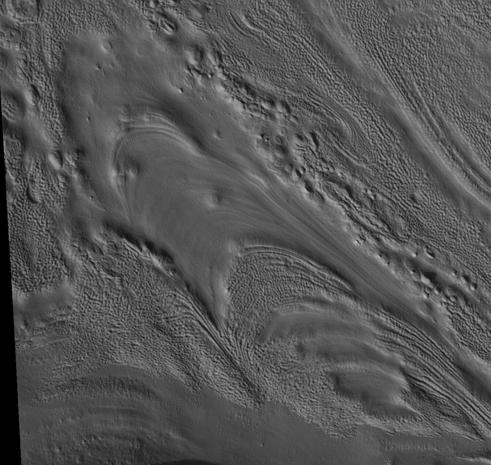
Coloe Fossae pits, as seen by HiRISE. Pits are believed to result from escaping water.

== See also ==
- Fossa (geology)
