= Fretted terrain =

Surface feature common to certain areas of Mars

Fretted terrain is a type of surface feature common to certain areas of Mars and was discovered in Mariner 9 images. It lies between two different types of terrain. The surface of Mars can be divided into two parts: low, young, uncratered plains that cover most of the northern hemisphere, and high-standing, old, heavily cratered areas that cover the southern and a small part of the northern hemisphere. Between these two zones is a region called the Martian dichotomy and parts of it contain fretted terrain. This terrain contains a complicated mix of cliffs, mesas, buttes, and straight-walled and sinuous canyons. It contains smooth, flat lowlands along with steep cliffs. The scarps or cliffs are usually 1 to 2 km high. Channels in the area have wide, flat floors and steep walls. Fretted terrain shows up in northern Arabia, between latitudes 30°N and 50°N and longitudes 270°W and 360°W, and in Aeolis Mensae, between 10 N and 10 S latitude and 240 W and 210 W longitude. Two good examples of fretted terrain are Deuteronilus Mensae and Protonilus Mensae.

Fretted terrain in Arabia Terra (Ismenius Lacus quadrangle), seems to transition from narrow straight valleys to isolated mesas. Most of the mesas are surrounded by forms that have been given a variety of names: circum-mesa aprons, debris aprons, rock glaciers, and lobate debris aprons. At first, they appeared to resemble rock glaciers on Earth. Even after the Mars Global Surveyor (MGS) Mars Orbiter Camera (MOC) took a variety of pictures of fretted terrain, experts could not tell for sure if material was moving or flowing as it would in an ice-rich deposit (glacier). Eventually, proof of their true nature was discovered when radar studies with the Mars Reconnaissance Orbiter showed that they contained pure water ice covered with a thin layer of rocks that insulated the ice.

Besides rock-covered glaciers around mesas, the region had many steep-walled valleys with lineations—ridges and grooves—on their floors. The material comprising these valley floors is called lineated valley fill. In some of the best images taken by the Viking Orbiters, some of the valley fill appeared to resemble alpine glaciers on Earth. Given this similarity, some scientists assumed that the lineations on these valley floors might have formed by flow of ice in (and perhaps through) these canyons and valleys. Today it is generally agreed that glacial flow caused the lineations.

Fretted terrain in Aeolis Mensae is similar to that of Arabia Terra, but it lacks debris aprons and lineated valley fill. The Medusae Fossae Formation, a friable, layered material that is covered with yardangs surrounds parts of the fretted terrain in Aeolis Mensae.

The origin of fretted plateau material is not completely understood. It does seem to contain fine-grained material, and it has an almost total lack of boulders. This material contrasts with most of the Martian surface which is covered with the igneous rock basalt. Basalt breaks into boulders and eventually into sand. It is thought that when plateau material breaks down, the small-sized particles can be easily carried away by the wind. Erosion of plateau material seems to be much faster than other materials on Mars. Research presented in 2018 at a Lunar and Planetary Science Conference in Texas suggested that the erosion that formed fretted terrain was aided by water moving under the surface.

There are many hypotheses that try to explain the origin of fretted channels and fretted terrain. Early ideas suggested fretted channels were caused by (1) groundwater sapping (2) ice-assisted mass wasting and debris flows (3) the process by which fluvial valley networks formed, or (4) the lateral enlargement of pre-existing fluvial channels by glacial lobate debris aprons and sublimation.

McGill (2000) noted that the glacial lobate and lineated valley fills are much more recent than the fretted channels and hence are not directly related to their formation. Other fretted terrain/channel models stress the possibility of volcanic or intrusive activity melting ground ice. Carruthers and McGill (1998) proposed that phreatomagmatic eruptions provided water for valley incision, which can also explain the formation of closed canyons. On the other hand, Cassanelli and Head, 2016, Cassanelli and Head, 2018b suggested that lava heating and loading of ice sheets caused melting of subsurface ice, started groundwater flow, sapping, and channel formation by back-erosion. In addition, the meandering morphology of many channels suggests incision by liquid water, but there is no agreement that the erosion reflects overland runoff causing erosion at steep scarps. or groundwater sapping and subsurface discharge.

Fretted terrain and fretted channels in northeastern Arabia Terra are among the least understood landscapes on Mars, and the timing and nature of their formation remains a puzzle according to researchers who studied available photos. The authors of the paper found evidence for a subsurface origin of fretted channels, that includes closed depressions, plateau surface collapse, and beaded pits merging into fretted channels. They suggest that fretted channels are closely related to the actions of volcanos and snow/ice accumulation.

== Glaciers ==
Glaciers shaped much of the observable surface in large area of Mars, including fretted terrain. Much of the area in high latitudes, especially the Ismenius Lacus quadrangle, is believed to still contain enormous amounts of water ice. The ice was probably deposited as snow during a different climate in the past. The tilt of Mars changes far more than the Earth's tilt. At times the tilt changes such that the polar ice caps sublimate and the atmosphere carries the moisture to the mid-latitudes where snow falls and accumulates. The Earth's tilt is stabilized by our rather large moon. The two moons of Mars are tiny. It would be difficult to take a hike on the fretted terrain because the surface is folded, pitted, and often covered with linear striations. The striations show the direction of movement. Much of this rough texture is due to sublimation of buried ice creating pits. The ice goes directly into a gas (this process is called sublimation) and leaves behind an empty space. Overlying material then collapses into the void. Glaciers are not pure ice; they contain dirt and rocks.

=== Cliffs ===
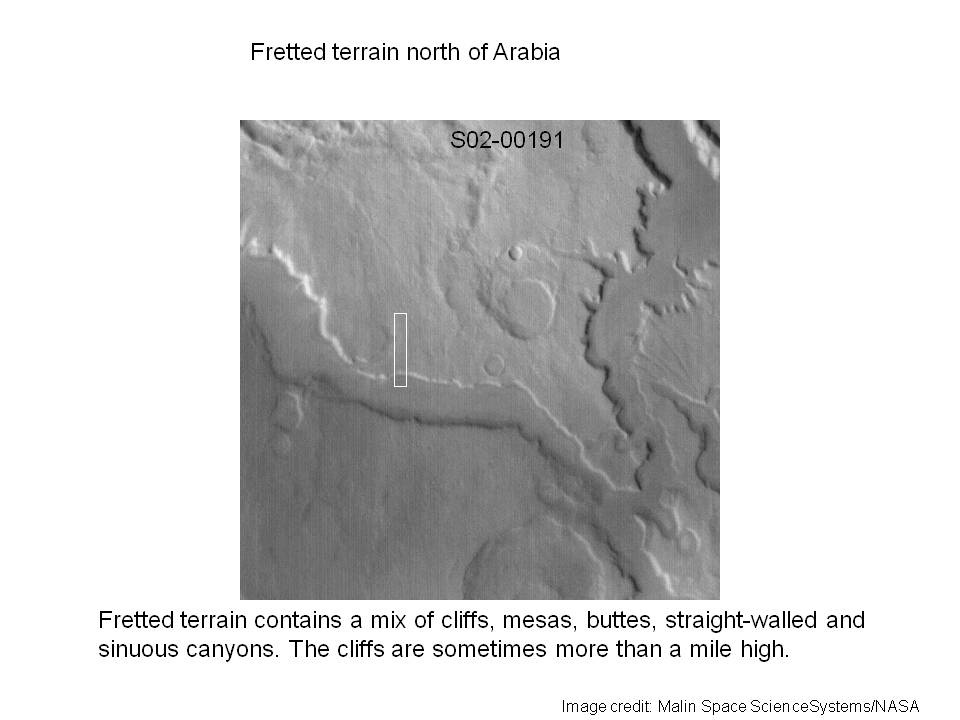
Fretted terrain of Ismenius Lacus showing flat floored valleys and cliffs. Photo taken with Mars Orbiter Camera (MOC)on the Mars Global Surveyor.

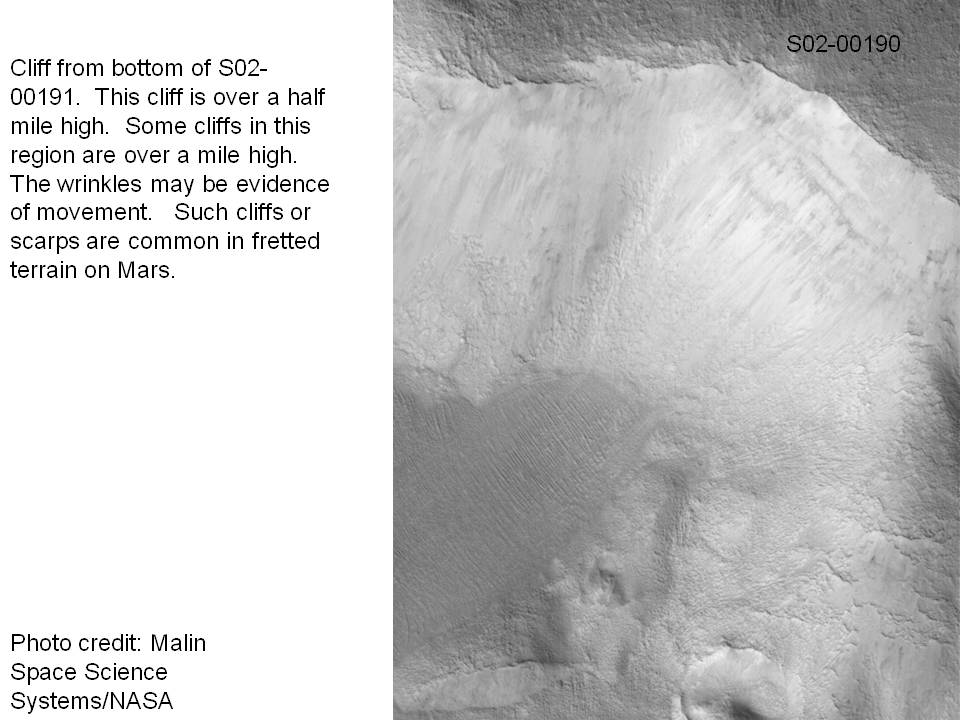
Enlargement of the photo on the left showing cliff. Photo taken with high resolution camera of Mars Global Surveyor (MGS).

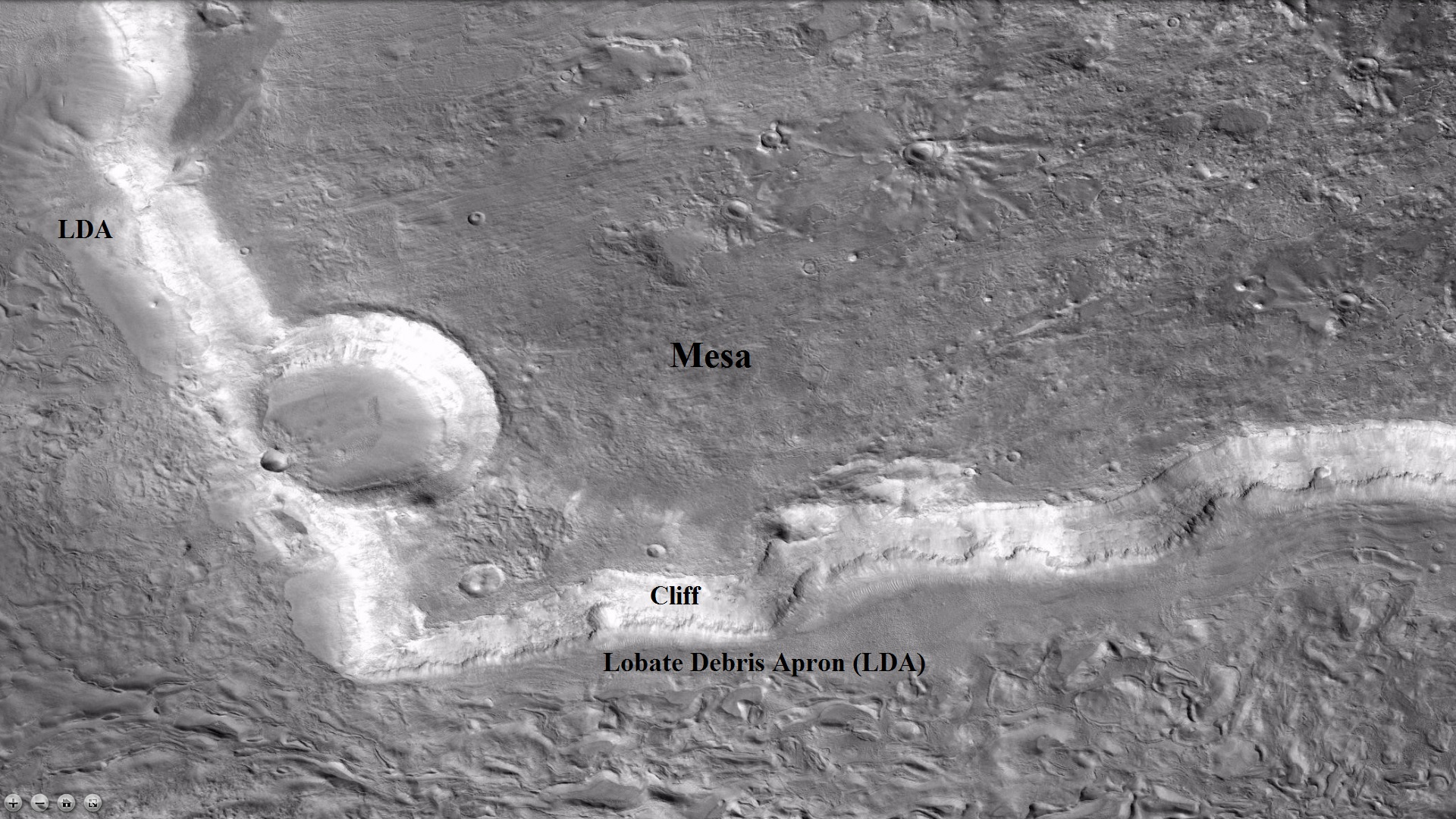
Wide view of mesa with CTX showing Cliff face and location of lobate debris apron (LDA). Location is Ismenius Lacus quadrangle.

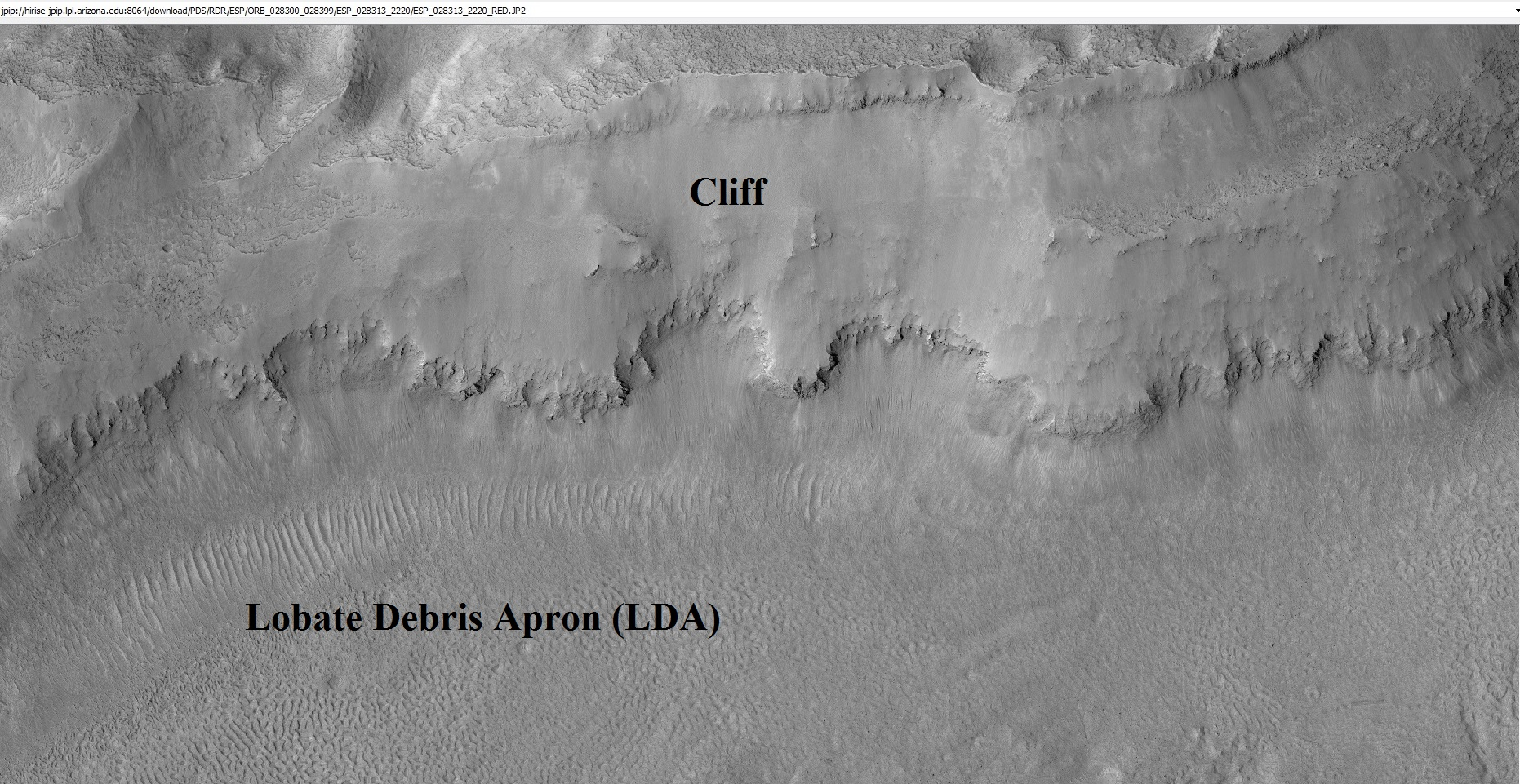
Enlargement of previous CTX image of mesa This image shows the cliff face and detail in the LDA. Image taken with HiRISE under HiWish program. Location is Ismenius Lacus quadrangle.

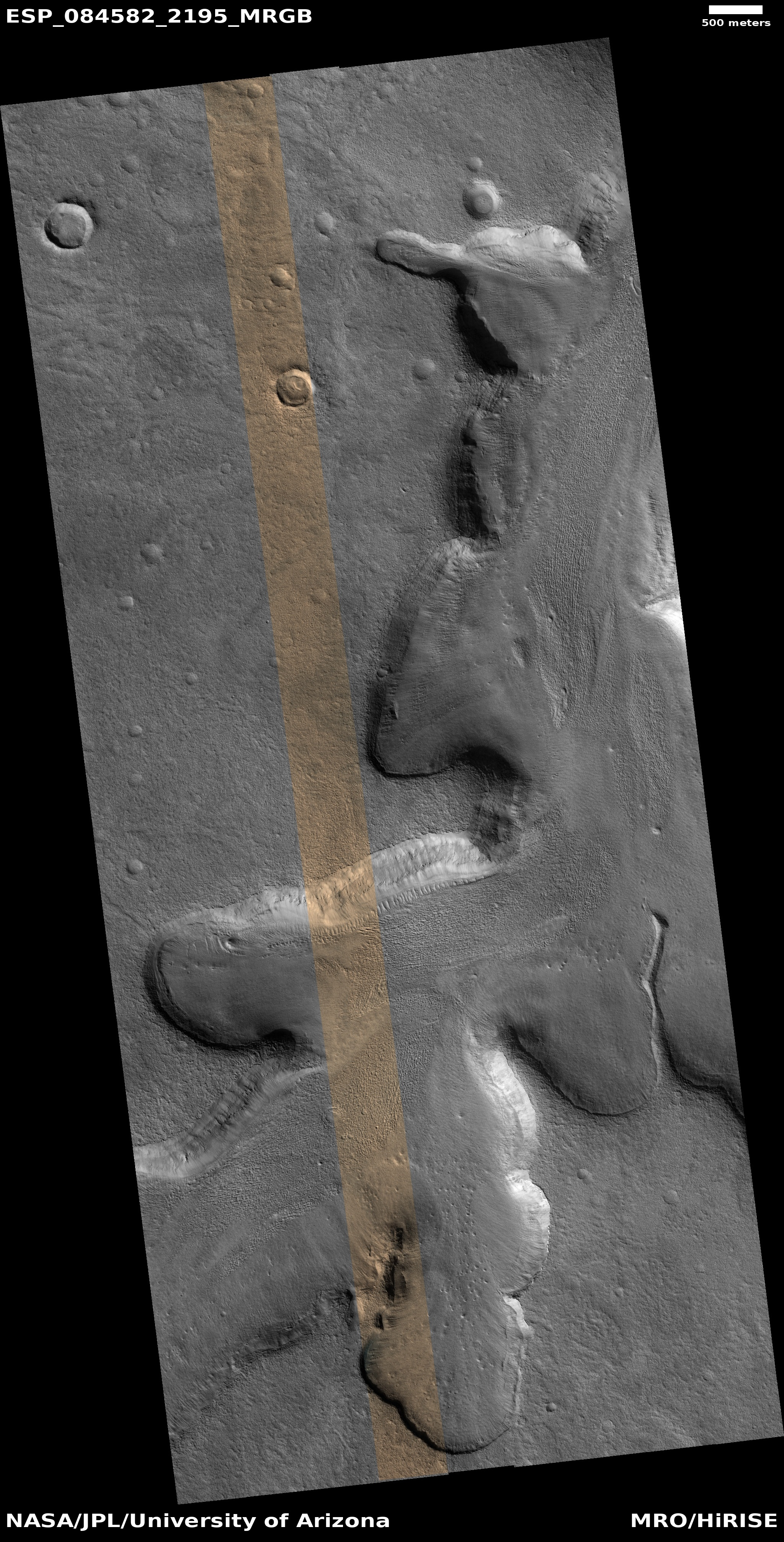
Flat floored valley with steep cliffs in fretted terrain, as seen by HiRISE under HiWish program

=== Lineated floor deposits ===
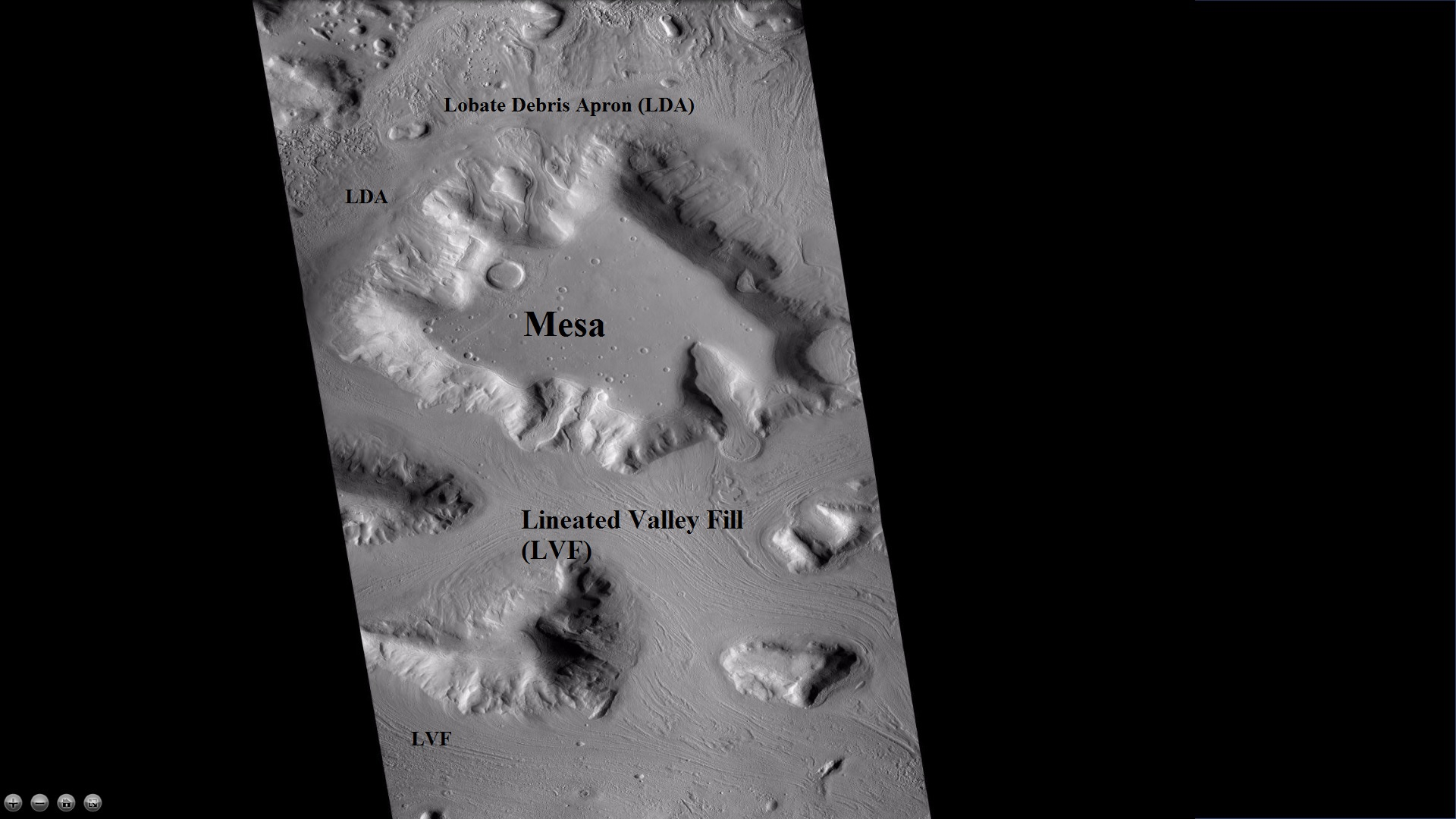
Wide CTX view showing mesa and buttes with lobate debris aprons and lineated valley fill around them. Location is Ismenius Lacus quadrangle.

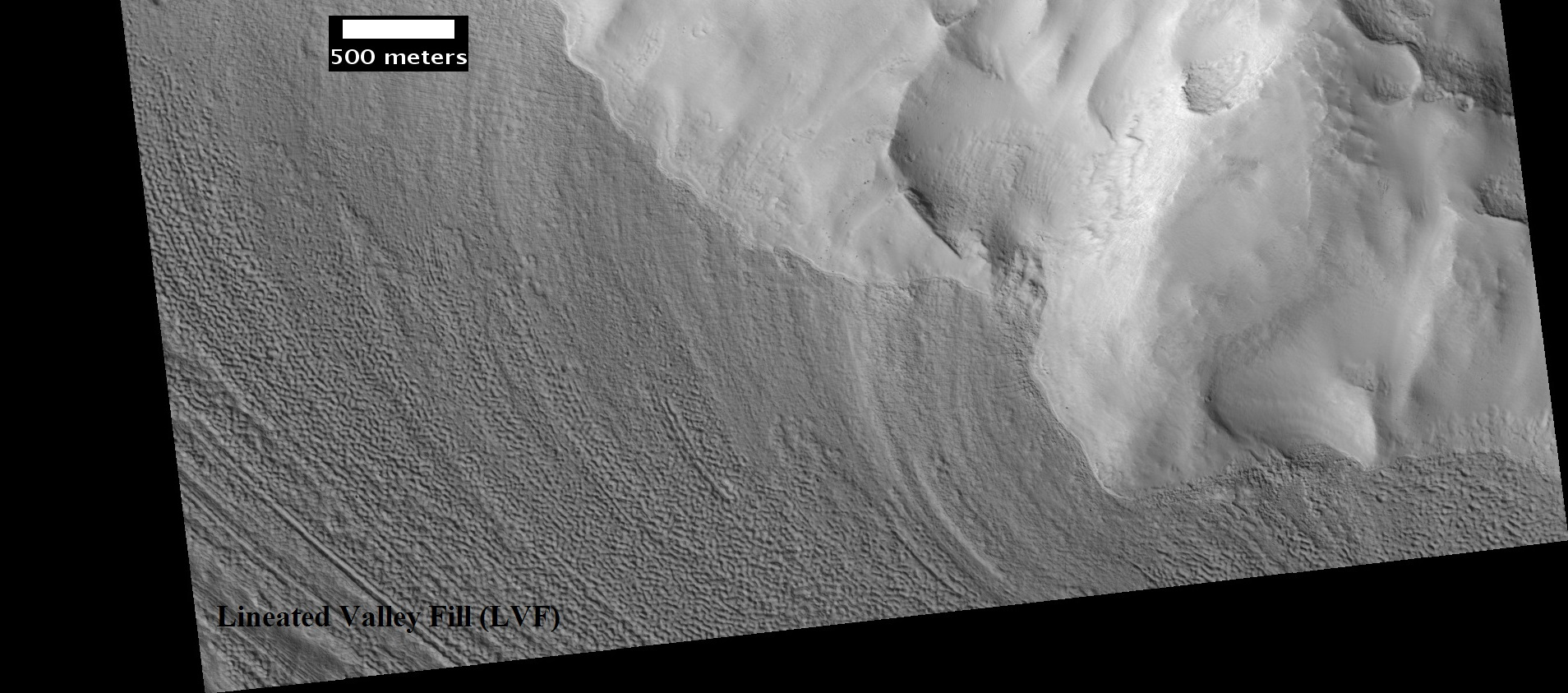
Close-up of lineated valley fill (LVF), as seen by HiRISE under HiWish program Note: this is an enlargement of the previous CTX image.

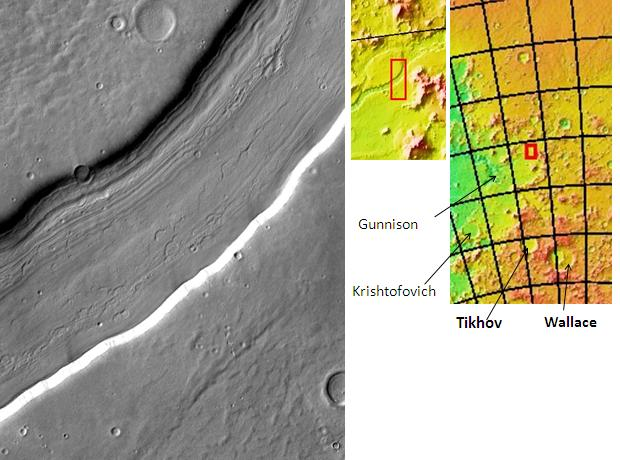
Reull Vallis with lineated floor deposits, as seen by THEMIS. Image located in Hellas quadrangle. Click on image to see relationship to other features.

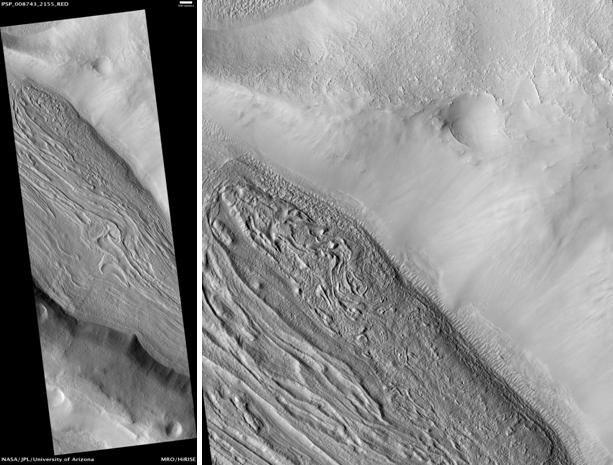
Coloe Fossae File:ESP 084582 2195 lineated valley fill (LVF) 02.jpg. Scale bar is 500 meters long.

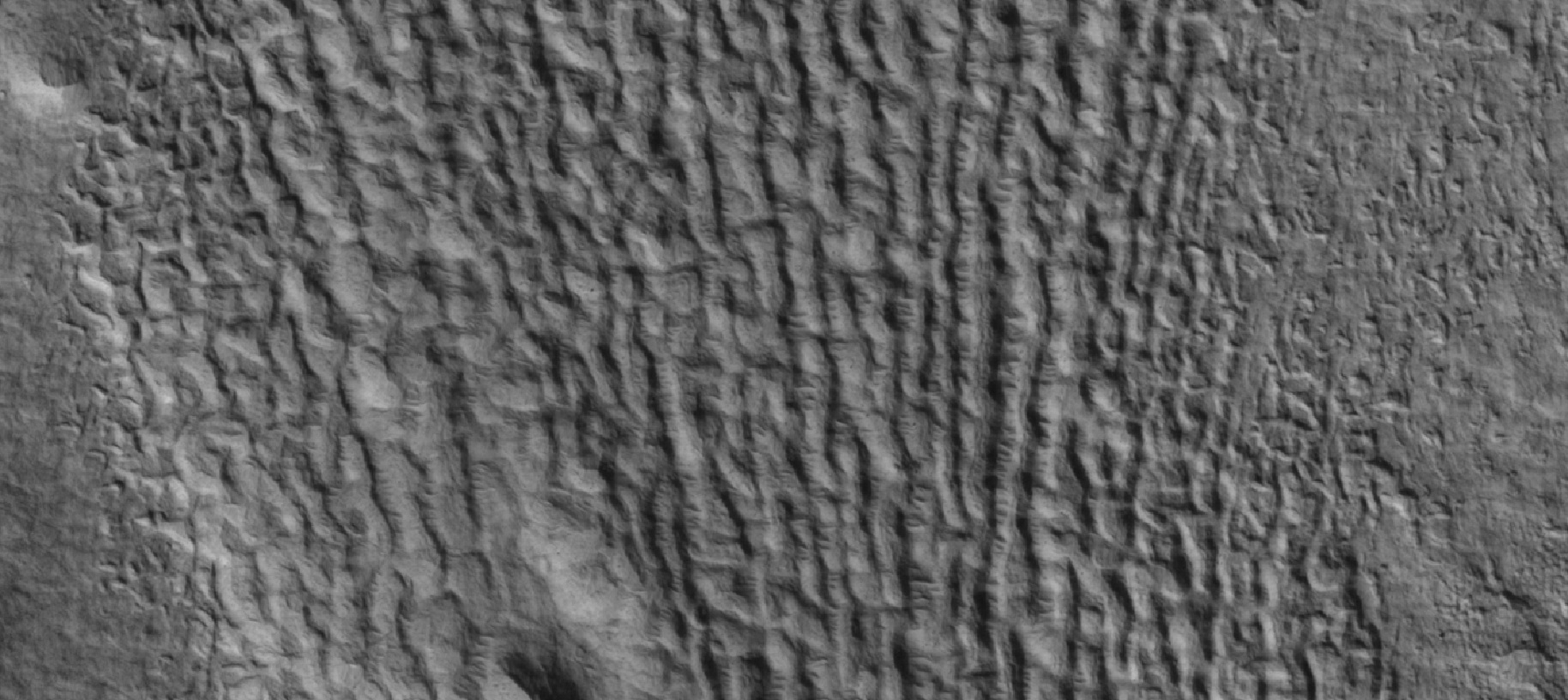
Close view of lineated valley fill (LVF) The image is about 1 km wide.

=== Pits ===
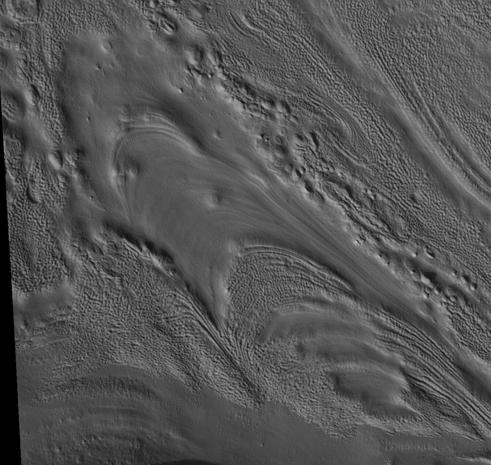
Coloe Fossae Pits, as seen by HiRISE. Pits are believed to result from escaping water.

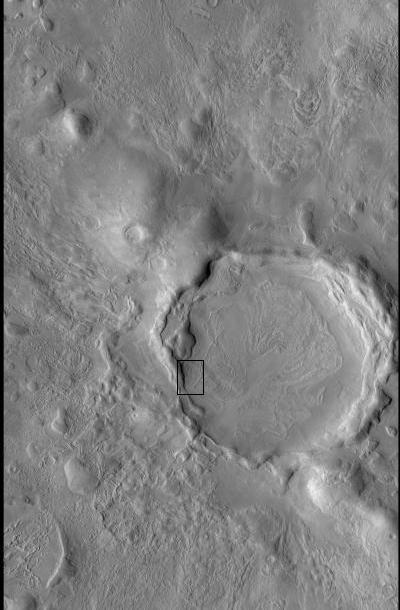
CTX Image in Protonilus Mensae, showing location of next image.

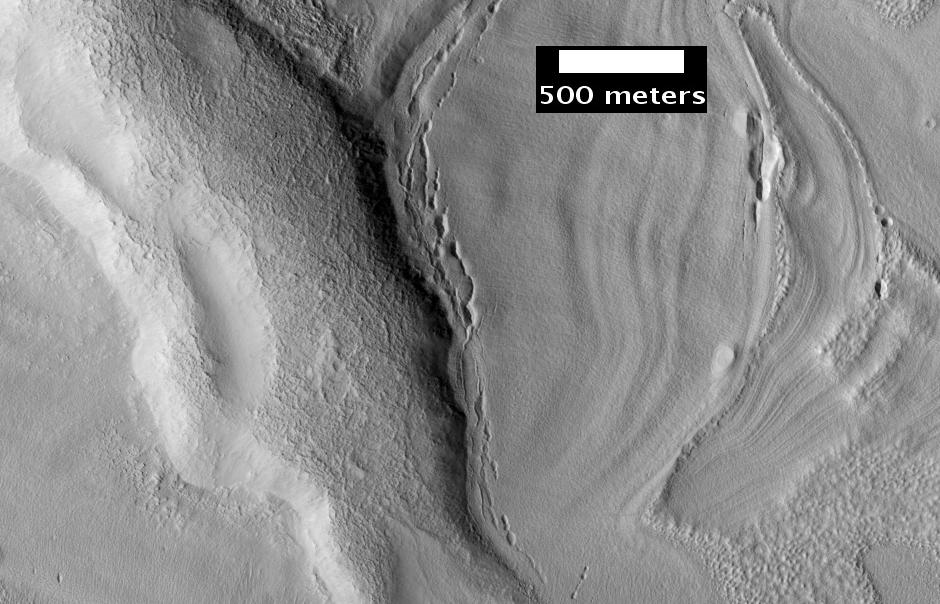
Pits in Protonilus Mensae, as seen by HiRISE, under the HiWish program.

=== Glacial features ===
Around the many mesas and buttes in fretted terrain in Arabia is a feature called lobate debris apron (LDA). We now believe it often is pure ice with a thin covering of debris. Radar studies have determined that LDAs contain ice; therefore these can be important for future colonists of Mars.

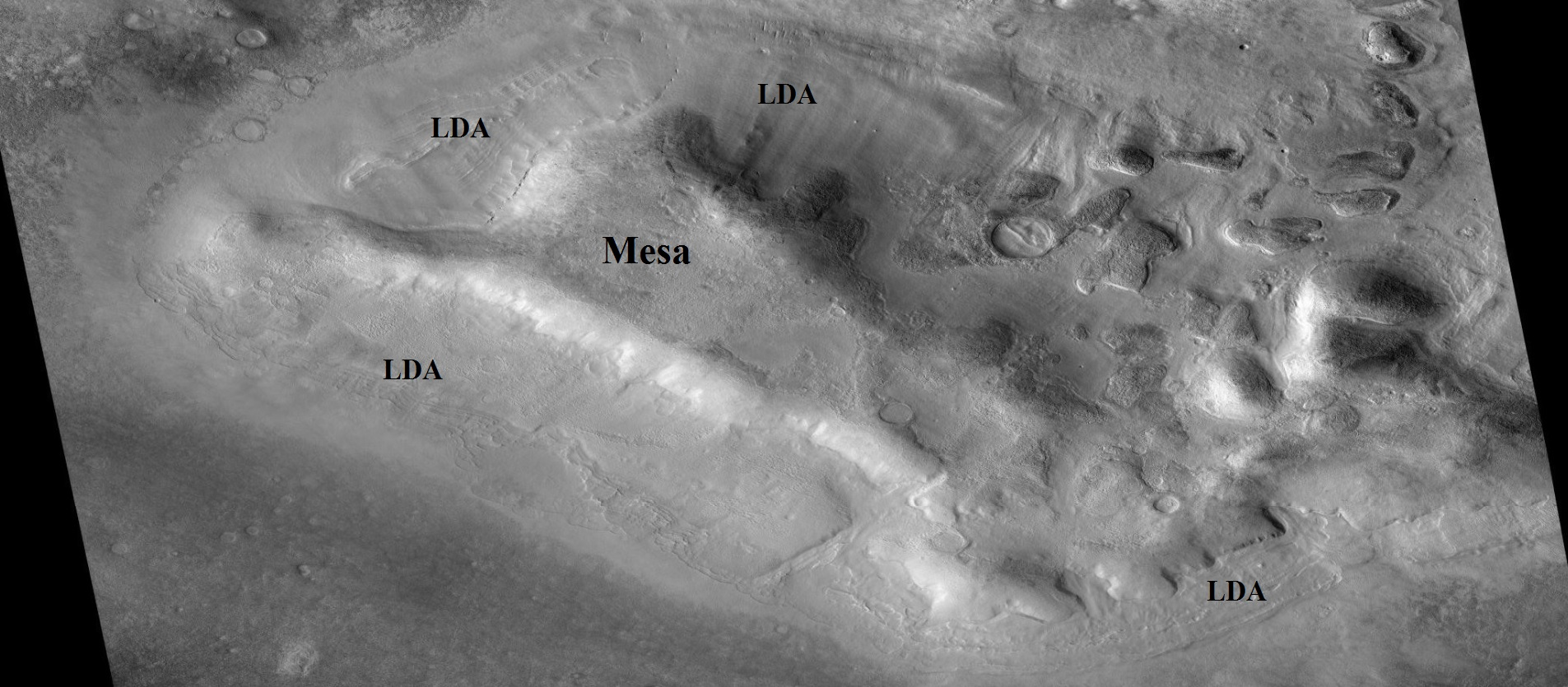
Lobate debris aprons (LDAs) around a mesa, as seen by CTX. Mesa and LDAs are labeled so one can see their relationship.

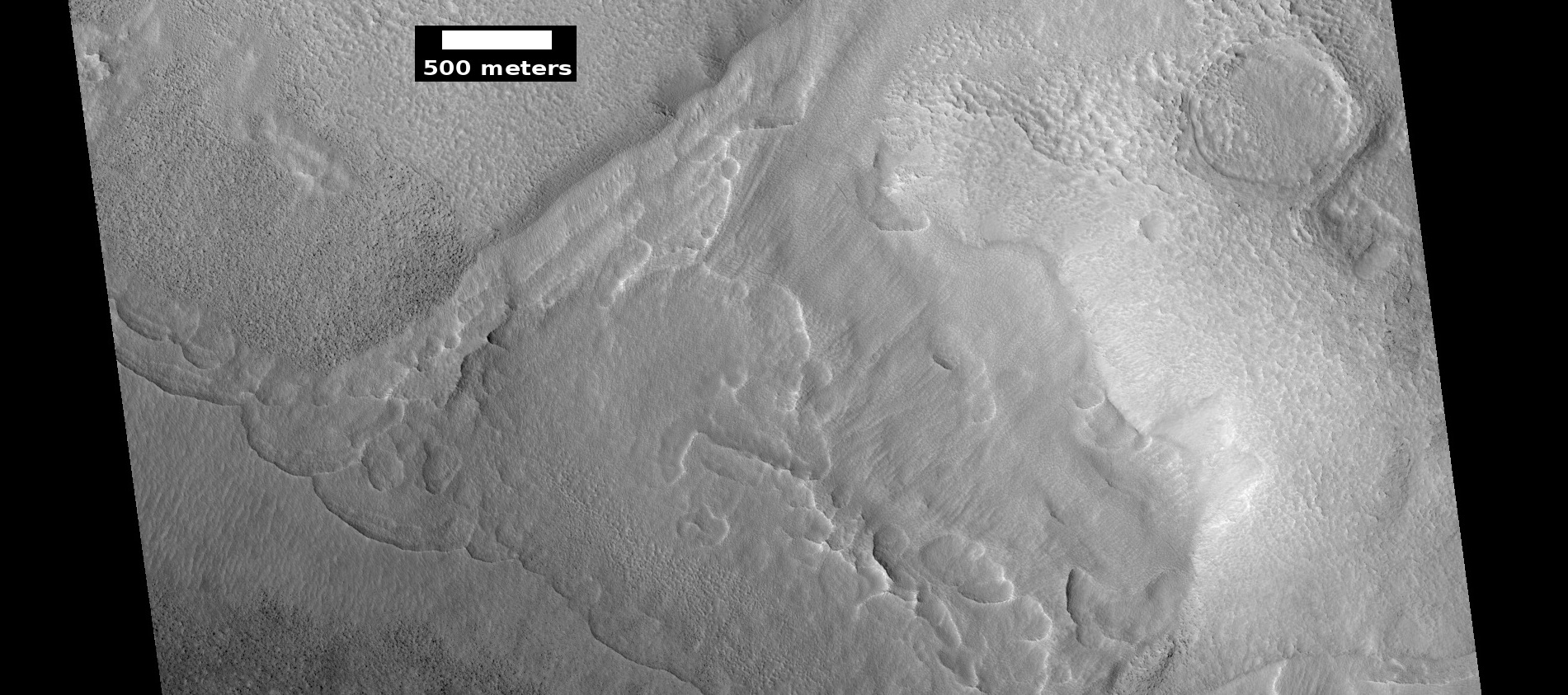
Close-up of lobate debris apron (LDA), as seen by HiRISE under HiWish program Location is Ismenius Lacus quadrangle.

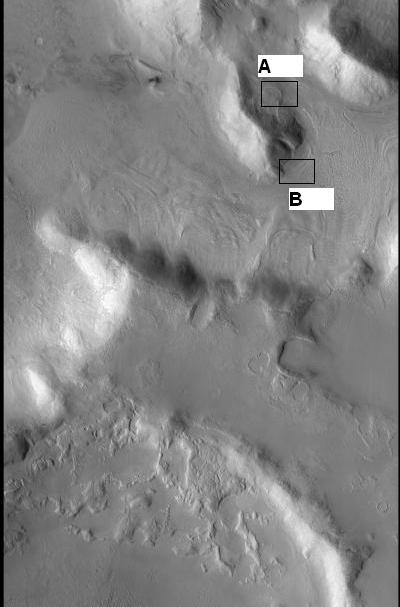
CTX context image showing location of next HiRISE image (letter A box). Location is Ismenius Lacus quadrangle.

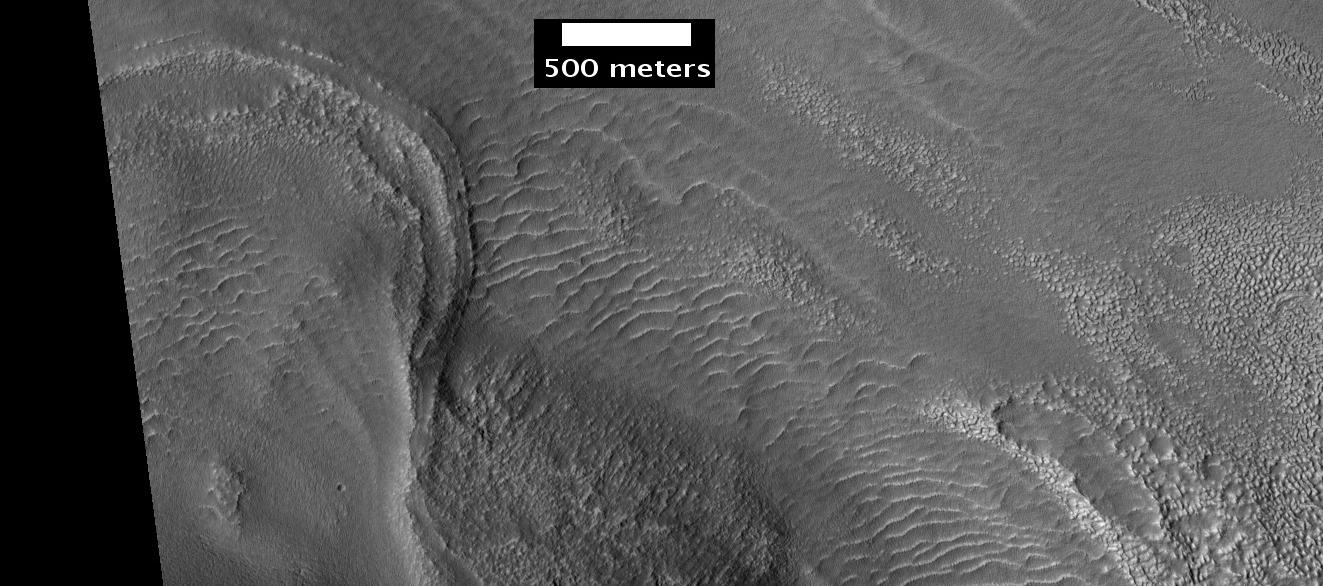
Possible moraine on the end of a past glacier on a mound in Deuteronilus Mensae, as seen by HiRISE, under the HiWish program. Location of this image is the box labeled A in previous image.

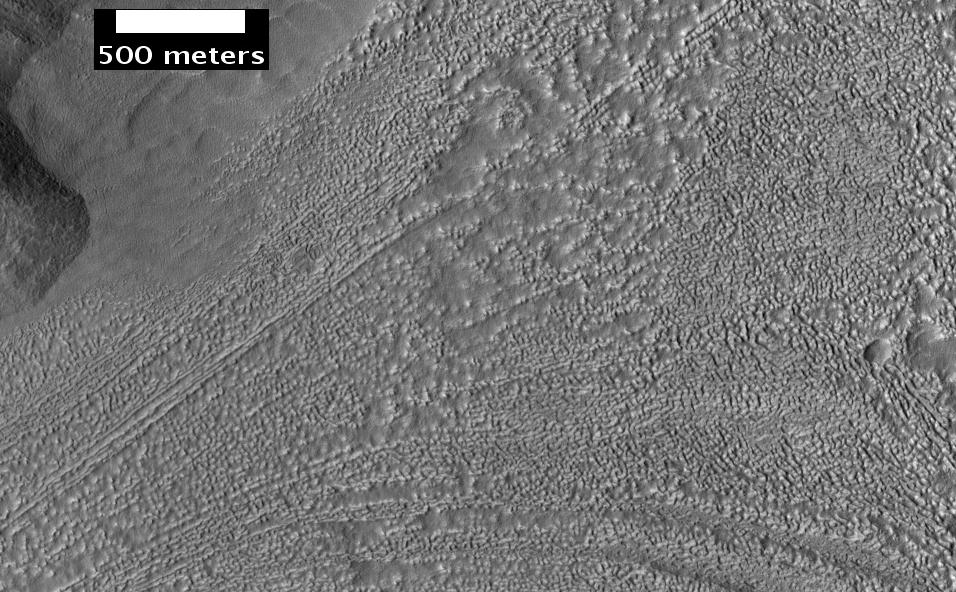
Complex surface around mound in Deuteronilus Mensae, as seen by HiRISE, under the HiWish program. Location of this image is in the black box labeled B in the CTX image above.

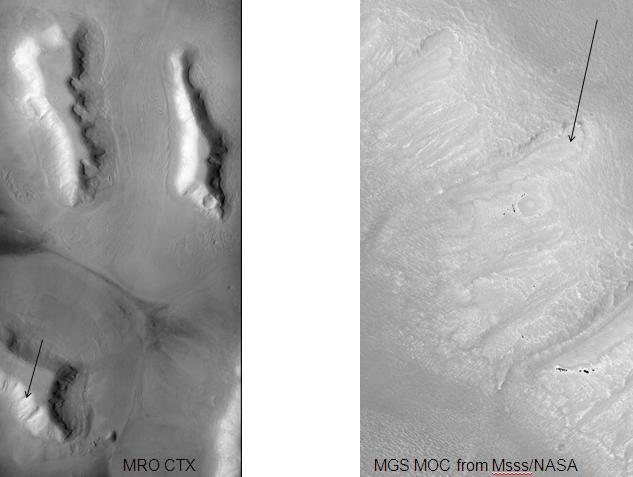
The arrow in the left picture points to a possibly valley carved by a glacier. The image on the right shows the valley greatly enlarged in a Mars Global Surveyor image.

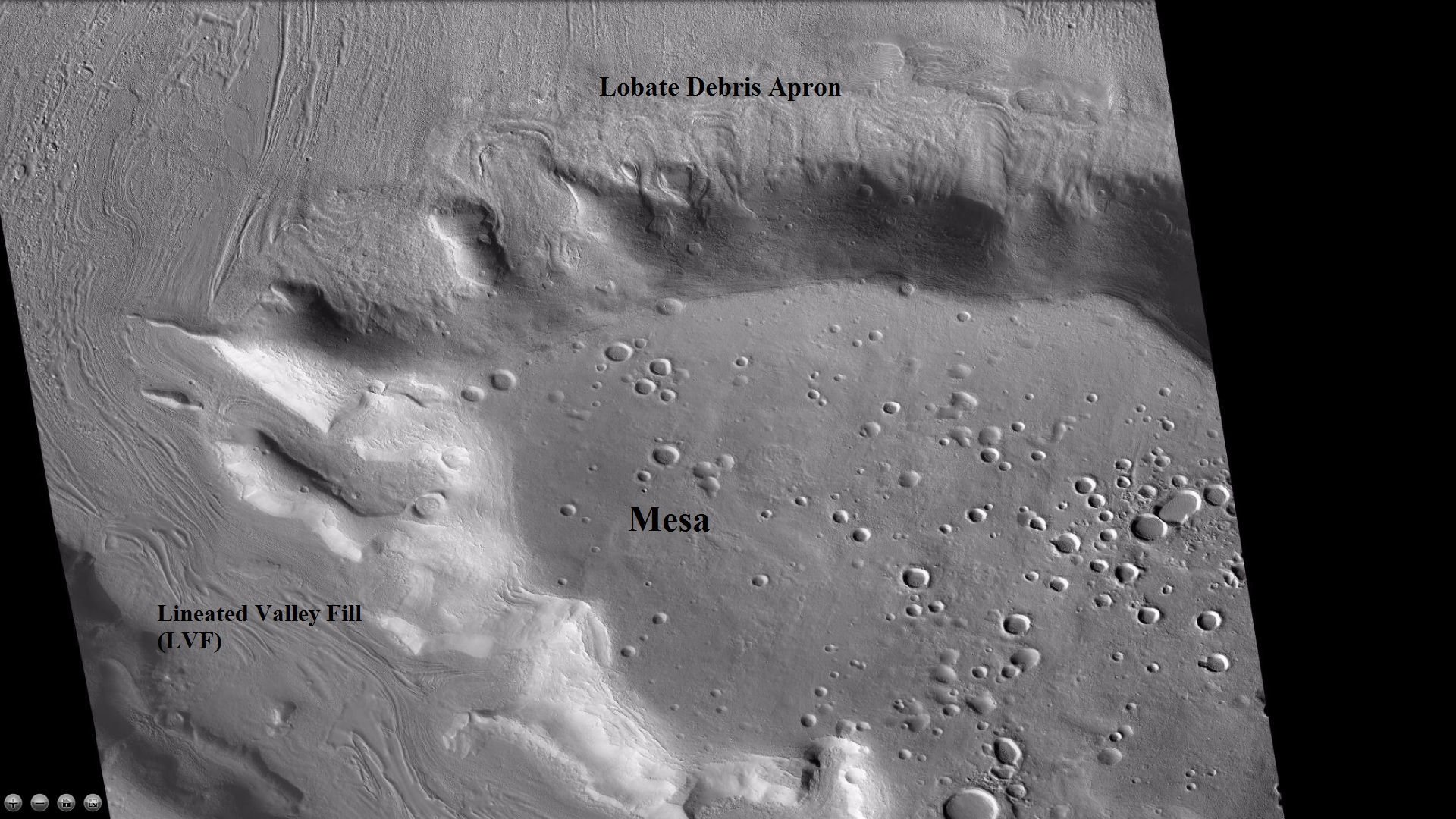
Wide CTX view of mesa showing lobate debris apron (LDA) and lineated valley fill. Both are believed to be debris-covered glaciers. Location is Ismenius Lacus quadrangle.

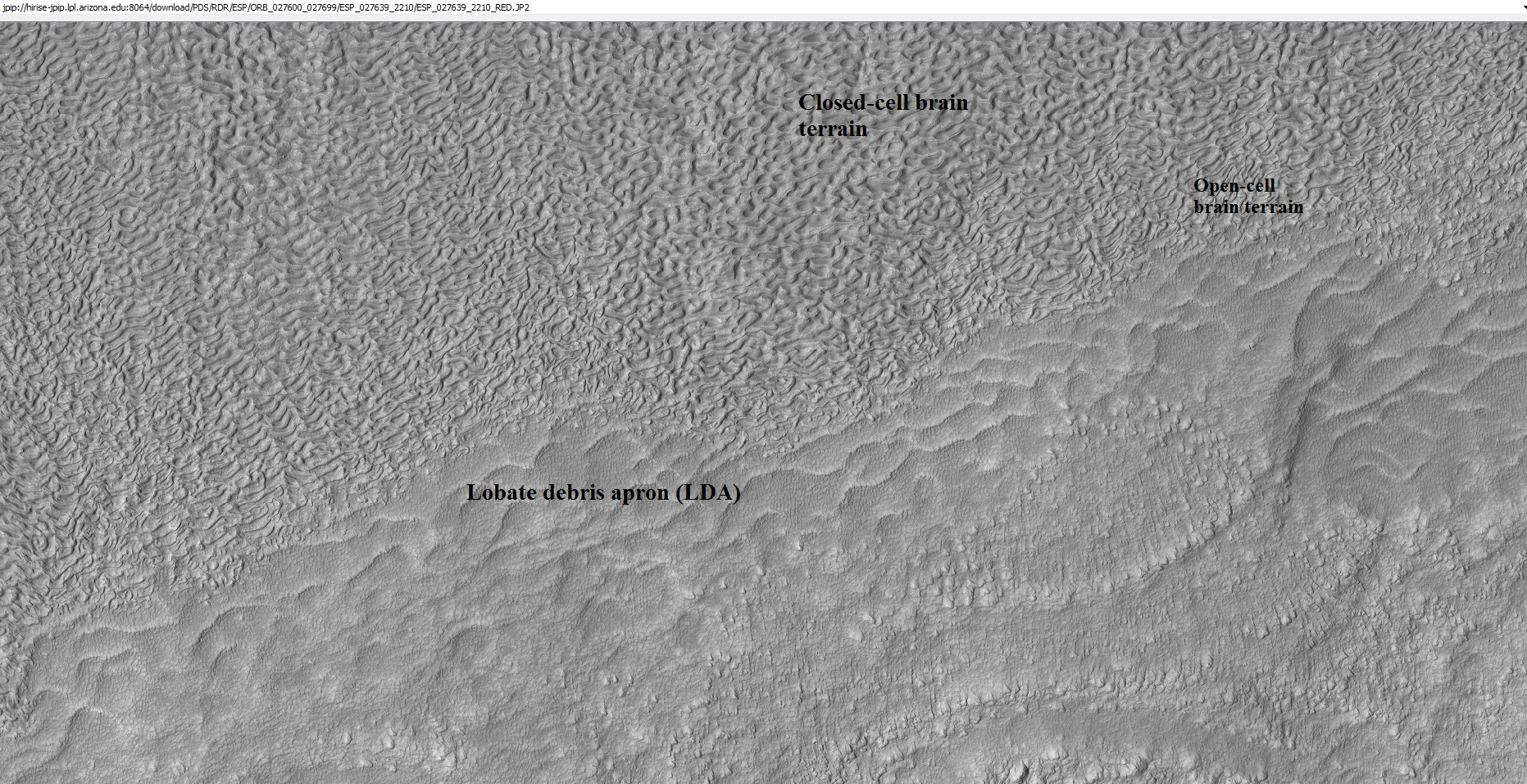
Close-up of lobate debris apron from the previous CTX image of a mesa. Image shows open-cell brain terrain and closed-cell brain terrain, which is more common. Open-cell brain terrain is thought to hold a core of ice. Image is from HiRISE under HiWish program.

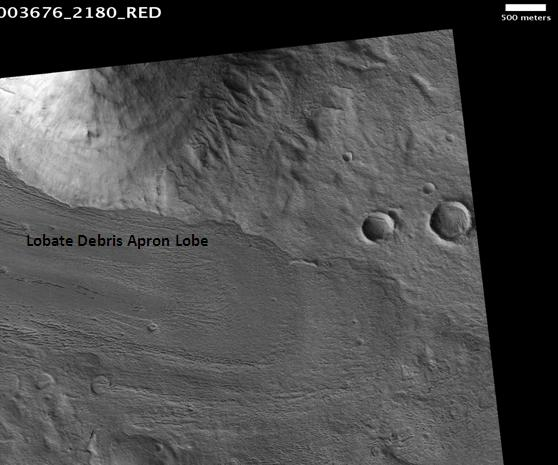
Lobate debris apron in Phlegra Montes, as seen by HiRISE. The debris apron is probably mostly ice with a thin covering of rock debris, so it could be a source of water for future Martian colonists. Image from the Cebrenia quadrangle. Scale bar is 500 meters long.

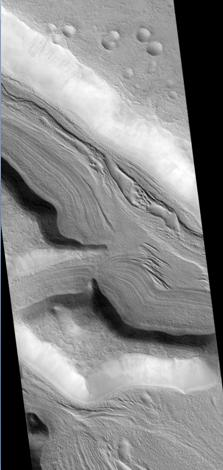
Hypsas Valles, as seen by HiRISE. Ridges are probably due to glacial flow. So water ice is under a thin layer of rocks.

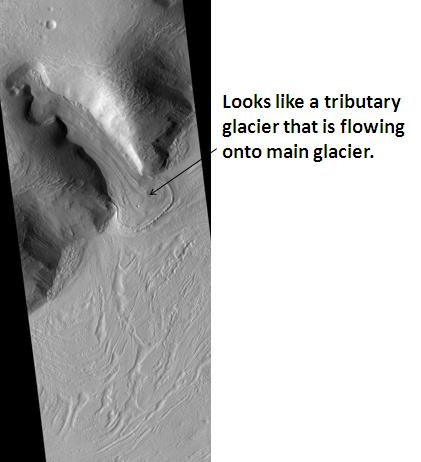
Tributary Glacier, as seen by HiRISE.

== Other examples of fretted terrain ==
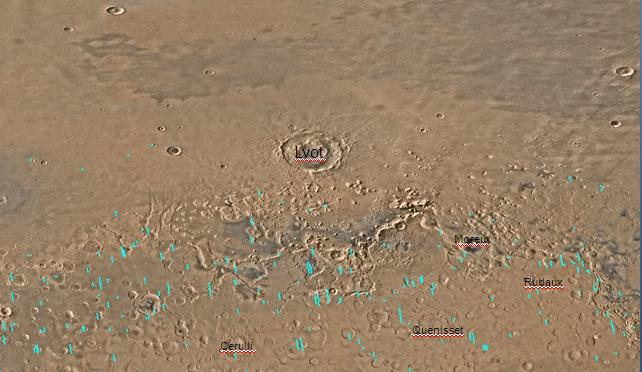
Map of Ismenius Lacus quadrangle which is located just north of Arabia, a large bright area of Mars. It contains large amounts of ice in glaciers that surround hills.

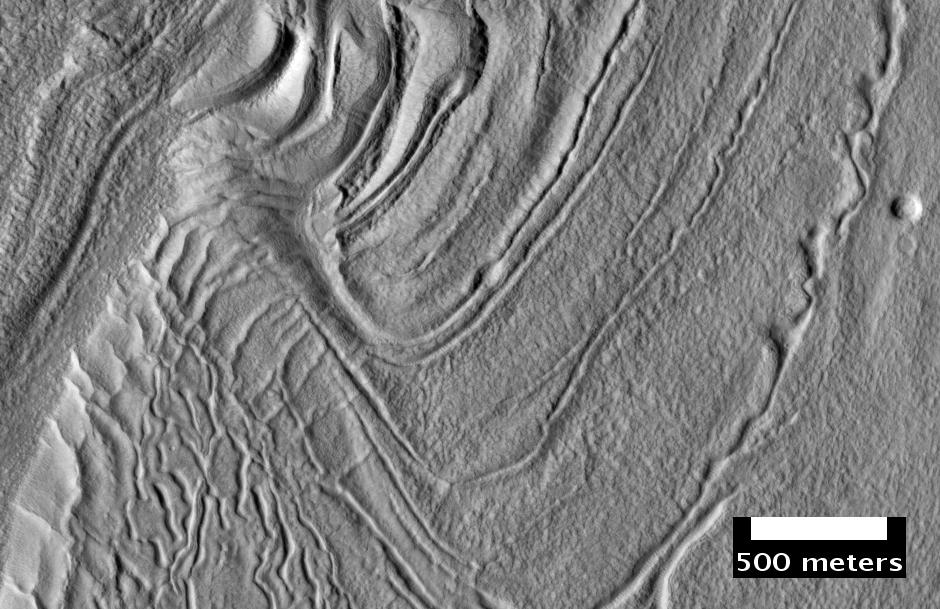
Surface of Nilosyrtis Mensae showing ridges and cracks, as seen by HiRISE, under the HiWish program.

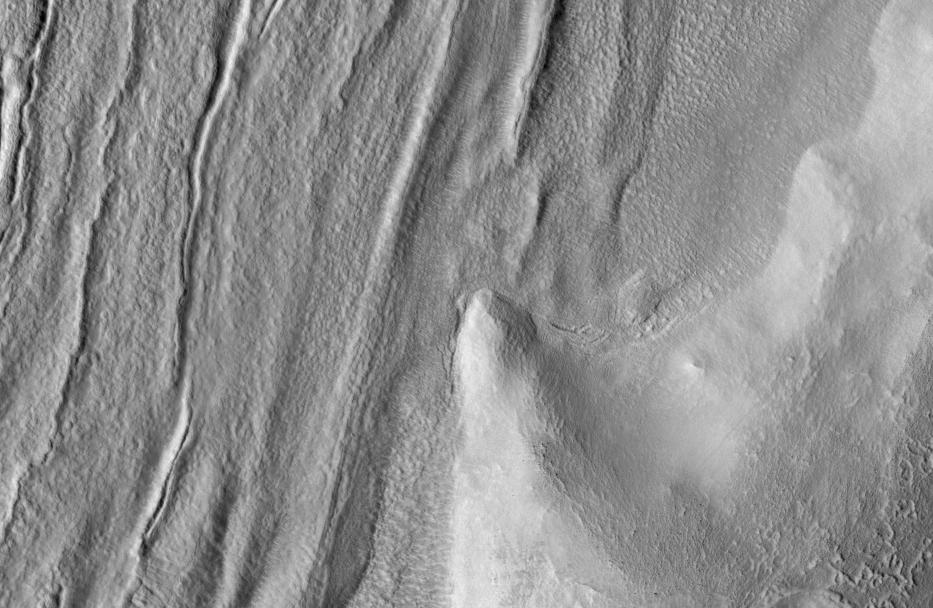
Another view of surface of Nilosyrtis Mensae, as seen by HiRISE, under the HiWish program.

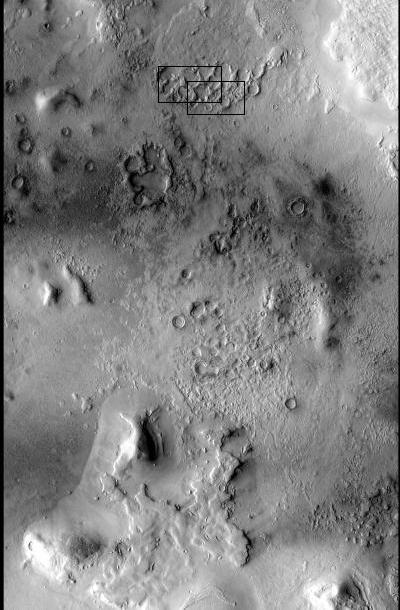
CTX Context image of Deuteronilus Mensae showing location of next two images.

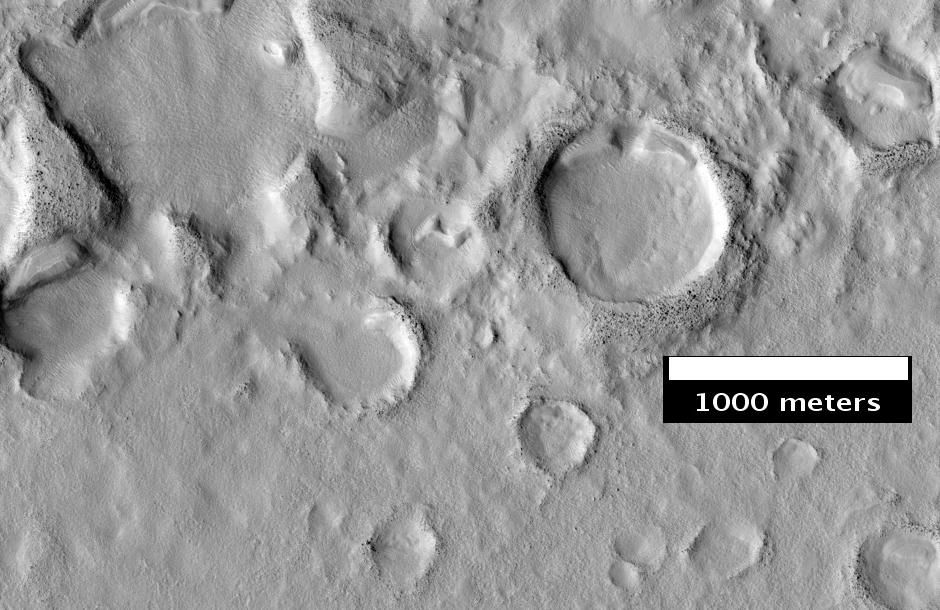
Eroded terrain in Deuteronilus Mensae, as seen by HiRISE, under the HiWish program.

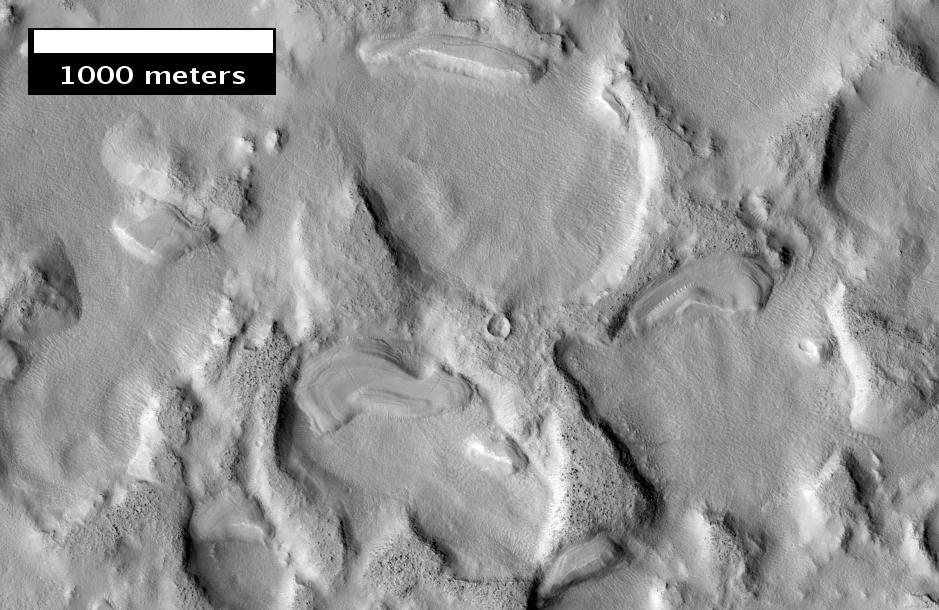
Another view of eroded terrain in Deuteronilus Mensae, as seen by HiRISE, under the HiWish program.

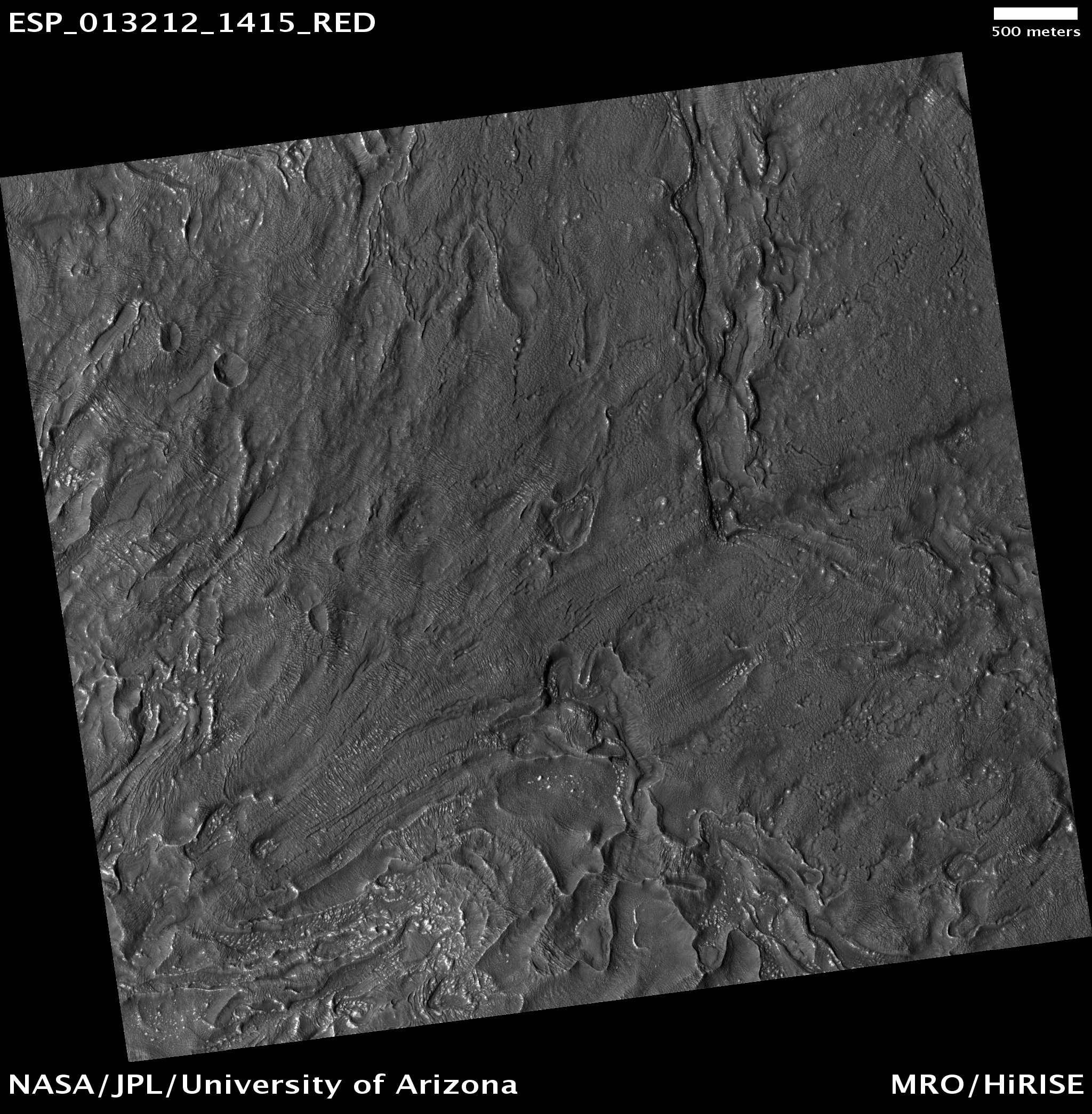
Fretted Terrain near Reull Vallis, as seen by HiRISE.

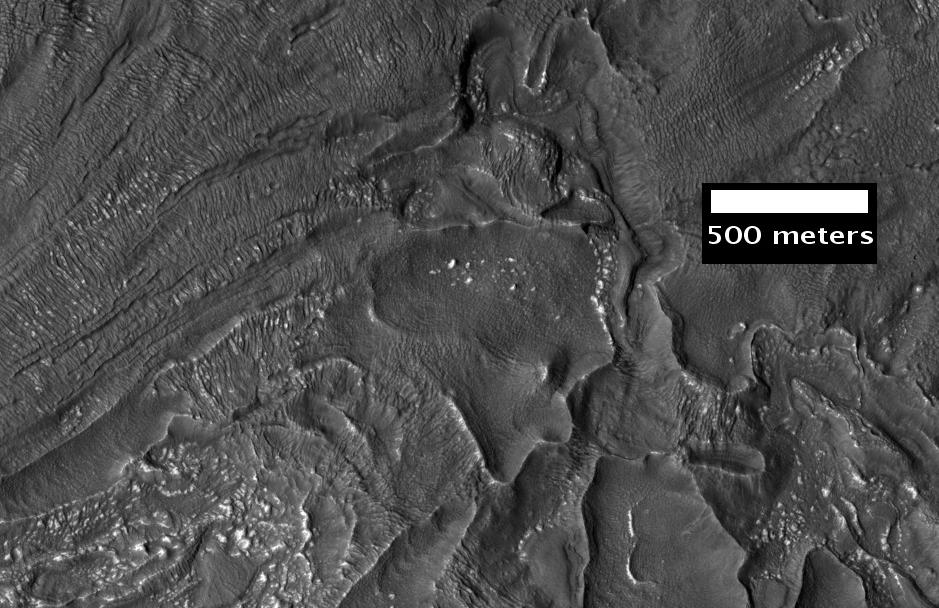
Close-up of Fretted Terrain near Reull Vallis, as seen by HiRISE. This area would be a challenge to walk across.

== See also ==
- Aeolis quadrangle – One of a series of 30 quadrangle maps of Mars
- Areography (geography of Mars) – Delineation and characterization of Martian regions
- Climate of Mars
- Deuteronilus Mensae – Mensae on Mars
- Geology of Mars – Geology of fourth planet from the Sun
- Glaciers on Mars – Extraterrestrial bodies of ice
- Ismenius Lacus quadrangle – Map of Mars
- Martian dichotomy – Geomorphological feature of Mars
- Medusae Fossae Formation – Large geological unit of uncertain origin on Mars
- Nilosyrtis Mensae – Fretted terrain in the Casius quadrangle on Mars
- Water on Mars – Study of past and present water on Mars
- Yardang – Streamlined aeolian landform
