= Vincenzo Cerulli =

Italian astronomer (1859–1927

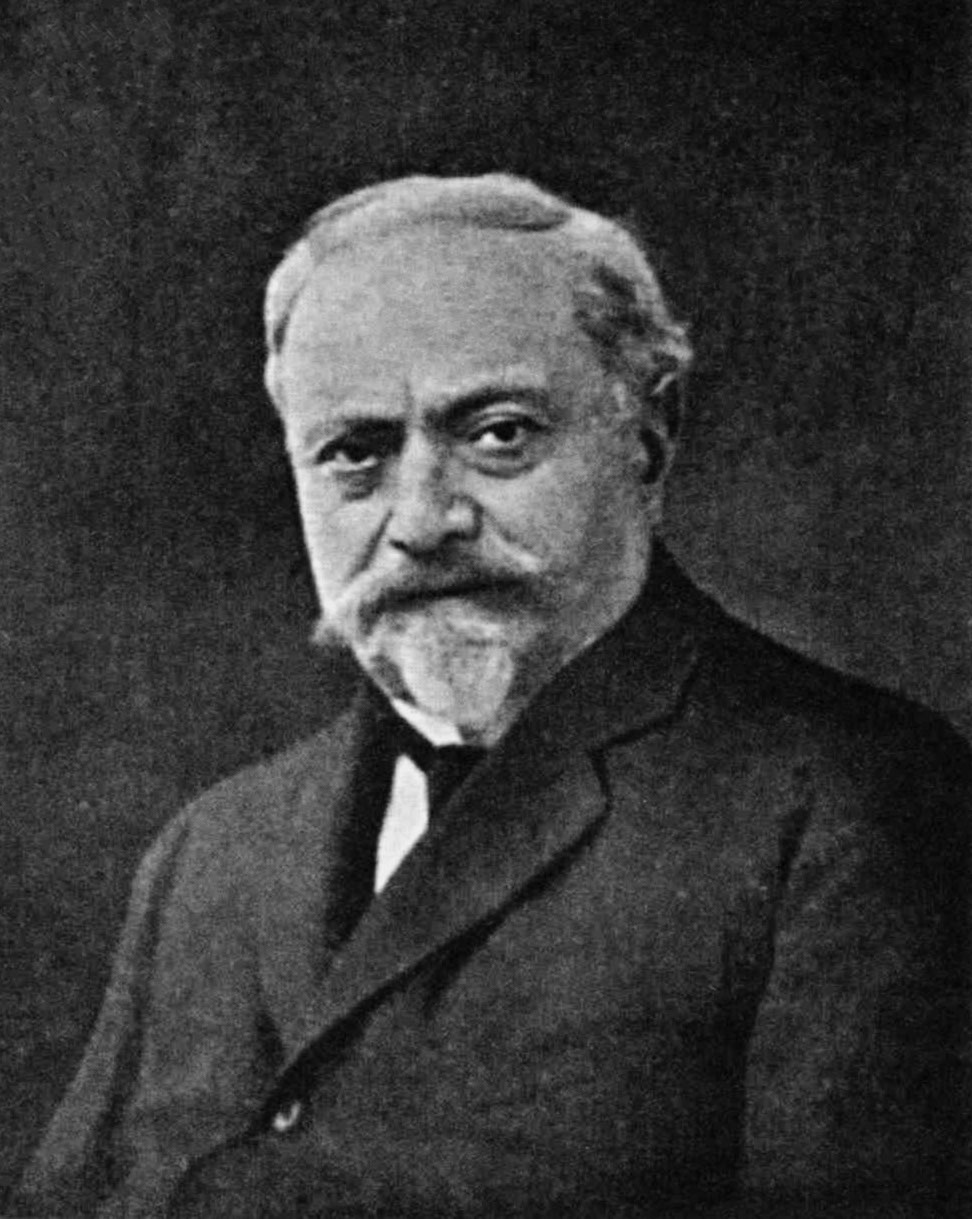
- Born: 20 April 1859; Teramo, Italy
- Died: 30 May 1927 (aged 68); Merate, Italy
- Scientific career
- Fields: Astronomy

Asteroids discovered: 1
704 Interamnia	2 October 1910	MPC

Vincenzo Cerulli (20 April 1859 – 30 May 1927) was an Italian astronomer and founder of the Collurania-Teramo Observatory in Teramo, central Italy, where he was born.

He earned a degree in physics from the Sapienza University of Rome in 1881, and continued his studies at the University of Berlin. Cerulli compiled a star catalog with Elia Millosevich. He was the astronomer at the Pontifical Gregorian University.

In 1890, he founded his observatory, which he named "Collurania", equipping it with a 40 cm Cooke refractor, which he had purchased for £2000 (£210,652 at the 2020 equivalent) from the son of British Astronomer, James Wigglesworth (born, Wibsey 1815) and which had been situated in Scarborough, before being dismantled and moved to Teramo. He also observed Mars and developed the theory that the Martian canals were not real but an optical illusion, a theory that was later confirmed.

He discovered one asteroid, 704 Interamnia, which is named after the Latin name for Teramo, and is notable for its relatively large diameter of approximately 350 km, which makes it the fifth largest body in the traditional asteroid belt.

Cerulli was a corresponding member of the Lincei Academy, Rome; the Pontaniana Academy, Naples; and the Academy of Sciences, Turin. He contributed the article on Lorenzo Respighi to the Catholic Encyclopedia.

Cerulli died at Merate, Province of Lecco, in 1927. The 130-kilometer Martian crater Cerulli, as well as the asteroids 366 Vincentina and 31028 Cerulli are named in his honor.
