= Ismenius Lacus quadrangle =

Map of Mars

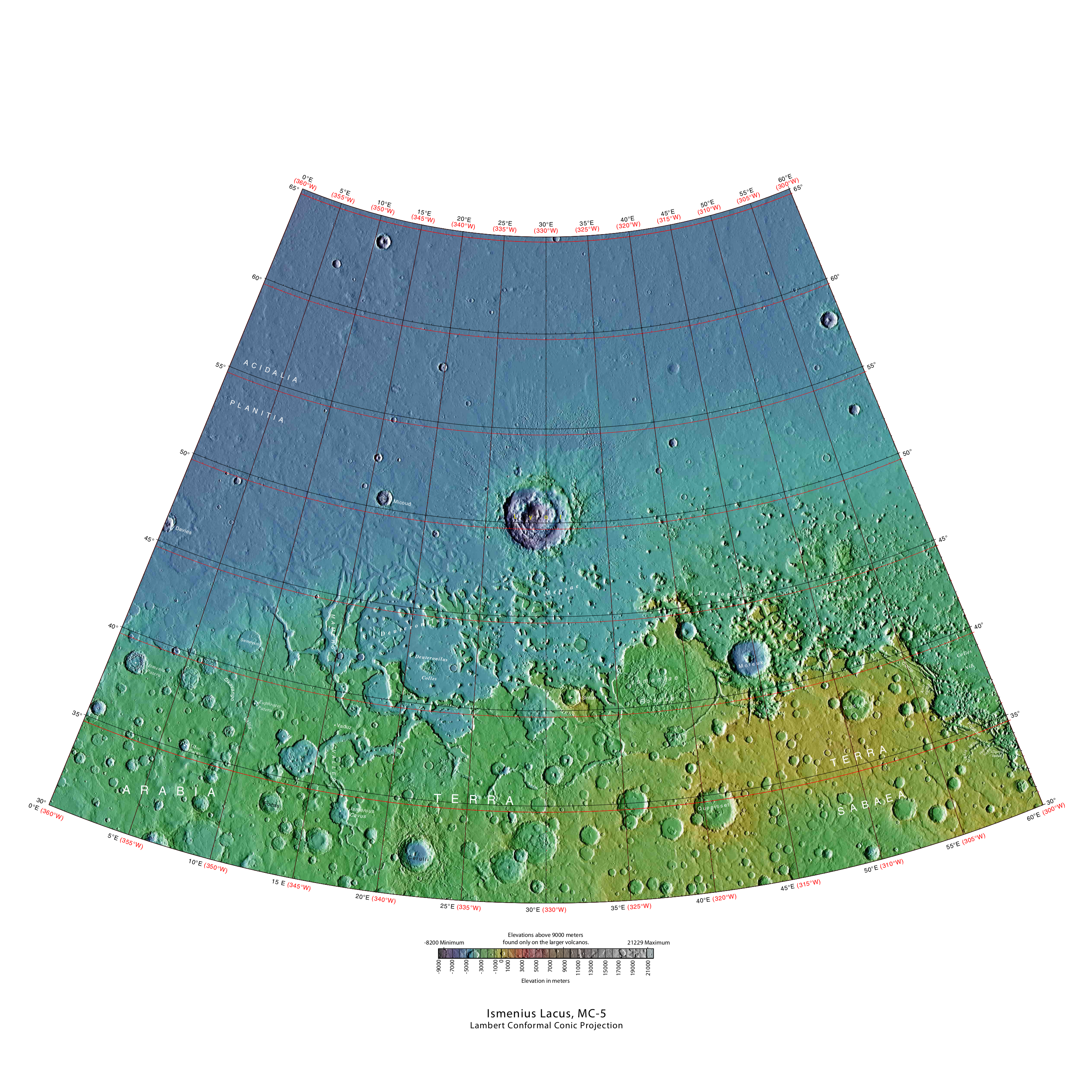
- Map of Ismenius Lacus quadrangle from Mars Orbiter Laser Altimeter (MOLA) data. The highest elevations are red and the lowest are blue.
- Coordinates: 47.5°N 330°W

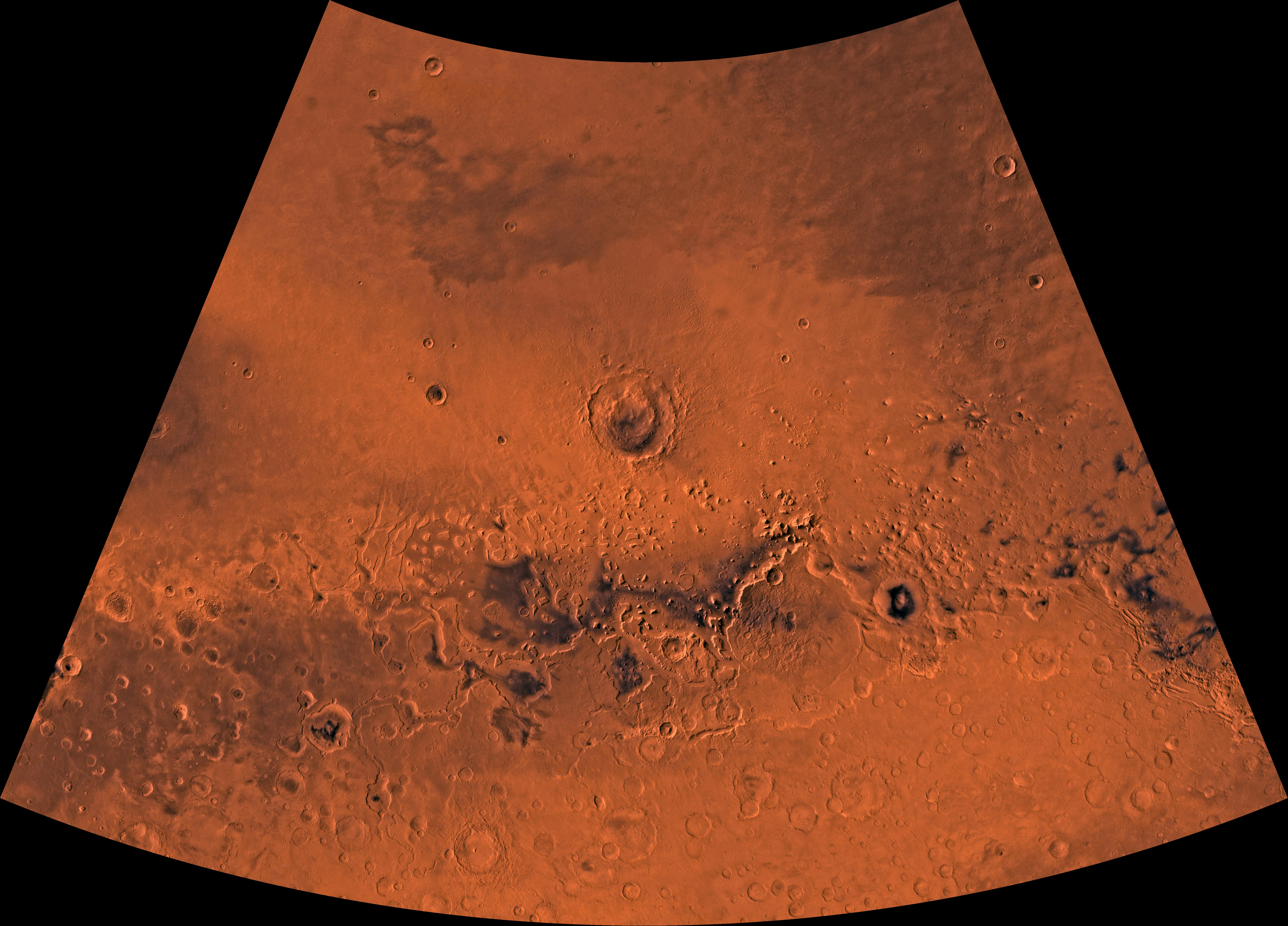
Image of the Ismenius Lacus Quadrangle (MC-5). The northern area contains relatively smooth plains; the central area, mesas and buttes; and the southern area, numerous craters.

The Ismenius Lacus quadrangle is one of a series of 30 quadrangle maps of Mars used by the United States Geological Survey (USGS) Astrogeology Research Program. The quadrangle is located in the northwestern portion of Mars' eastern hemisphere and covers 0° to 60° east longitude (300° to 360° west longitude) and 30° to 65° north latitude. The quadrangle uses a Lambert conformal conic projection at a nominal scale of 1:5,000,000 (1:5M). The Ismenius Lacus quadrangle is also referred to as MC-5 (Mars Chart-5). The southern and northern borders of the Ismenius Lacus quadrangle are approximately 3,065 km (1,905 mi) and 1,500 km (930 mi) wide, respectively. The north-to-south distance is about 2,050 km (1,270 mi) (slightly less than the length of Greenland). The quadrangle covers an approximate area of 4.9 million square km, or a little over 3% of Mars' surface area. The Ismenius Lacus quadrangle contains parts of Acidalia Planitia, Arabia Terra, Vastitas Borealis, and Terra Sabaea.

The Ismenius Lacus quadrangle contains Deuteronilus Mensae and Protonilus Mensae, two places that are of special interest to scientists. They contain evidence of present and past glacial activity. They also have a landscape unique to Mars, called fretted terrain. The largest crater in the area is Lyot Crater, which contains channels probably carved by liquid water.

== Origin of names ==
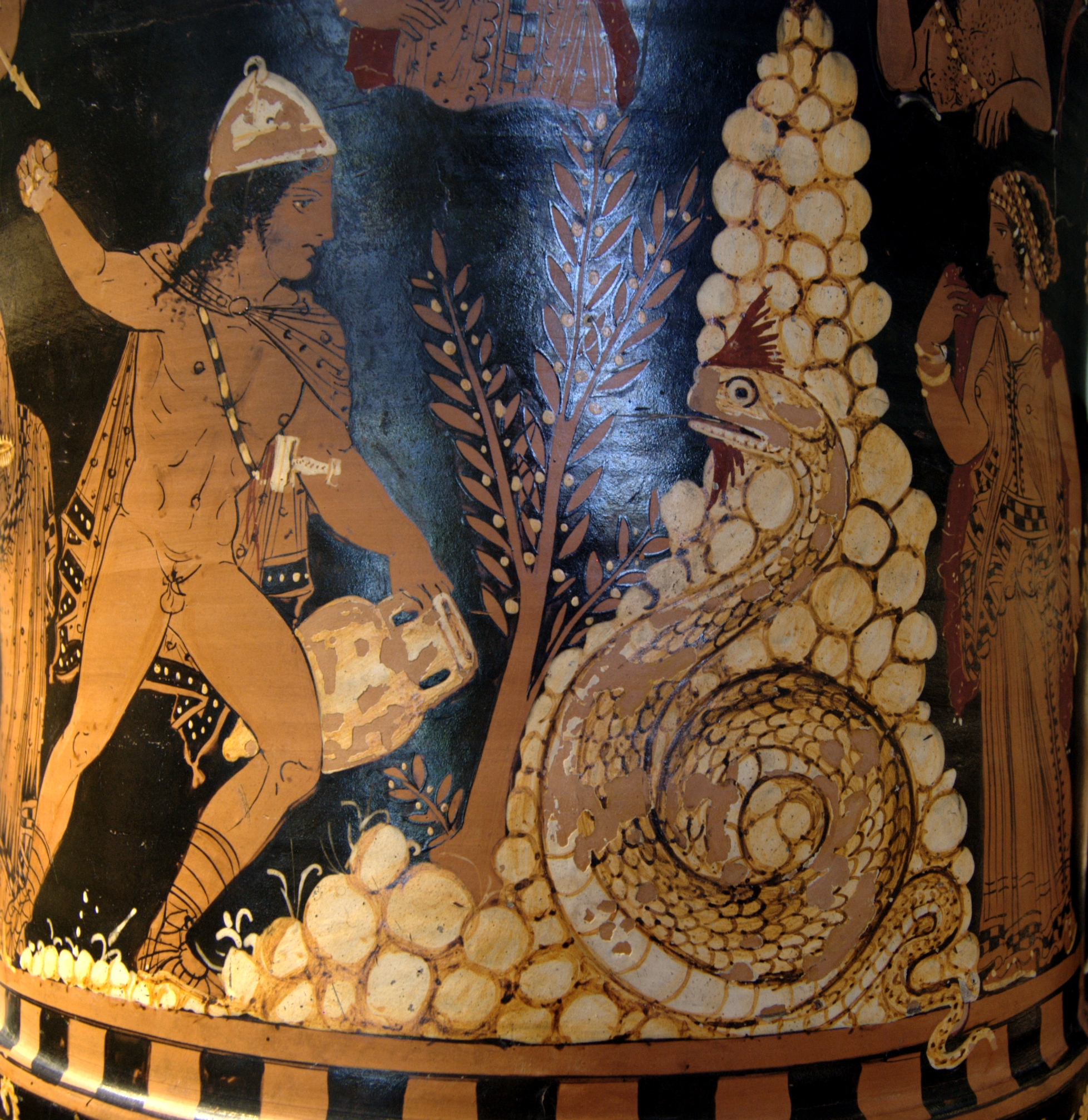
Cadmus slaying the dragon of the Ismenian Spring

Ismenius Lacus is the name of a telescopic albedo feature located at 40° N and 30° E on Mars. The term is Latin for Ismenian Lake, and refers to the Ismenian Spring near Thebes in Greece where Cadmus slew the guardian dragon. Cadmus was the legendary founder of Thebes, and had come to the spring to fetch water. The name was approved by the International Astronomical Union (IAU) in 1958.

There appeared to be a large canal in this region called Nilus. Since 1881–1882 it was split into other canals, some were called Nilosyrtis, Protonilus (first Nile), and Deuteronilus (second Nile).

== Physiography and geology ==
In eastern Ismenius Lacus, lies Mamers Valles, a giant outflow channel. The channel shown below goes quite a long distance and has branches. It ends in a depression that may have been a lake at one time. The first picture is a wide angle, taken with CTX; while the second is a close up taken with HiRISE.

== Lyot Crater ==
The northern plains are generally flat and smooth with few craters. However, a few large craters do stand out. The giant impact crater, Lyot, is easy to see in the northern part of Ismenius Lacus. Lyot Crater is the deepest point in Mars's northern hemisphere. One image below of Lyot Crater Dunes shows a variety of interesting forms: dark dunes, light-toned deposits, and dust devil tracks. Dust devils, which resemble miniature tornados create the tracks by removing a thin, but bright deposit of dust to reveal the darker underlying surface. Light-toned deposits are widely believed to contain minerals formed in water. Research, published in June 2010, described evidence for liquid water in Lyot crater in the past.

Many channels have been found near Lyot Crater. Research, published in 2017, concluded that the channels were made from water released when the hot ejecta landed on a layer of ice that was 20 to 300 meters thick. Calculations suggest that the ejecta would have had a temperature of at least 250 degrees Fahrenheit. The valleys seem to start from beneath the ejecta near the outer edge of the ejecta. One evidence for this idea is that there are few secondary craters nearby. Few secondary craters were formed because most landed on ice and did not affect the ground below. The ice accumulated in the area when the climate was different. The tilt or obliquity of the axis changes frequently. During periods of greater tilt, ice from the poles is redistributed to the mid-latitudes. The existence of these channels is unusual because although Mars used to have water in rivers, lakes, and an ocean, these features have been dated to the Noachian and Hesperian periods—4 to 3 billion years ago.

== Other craters ==
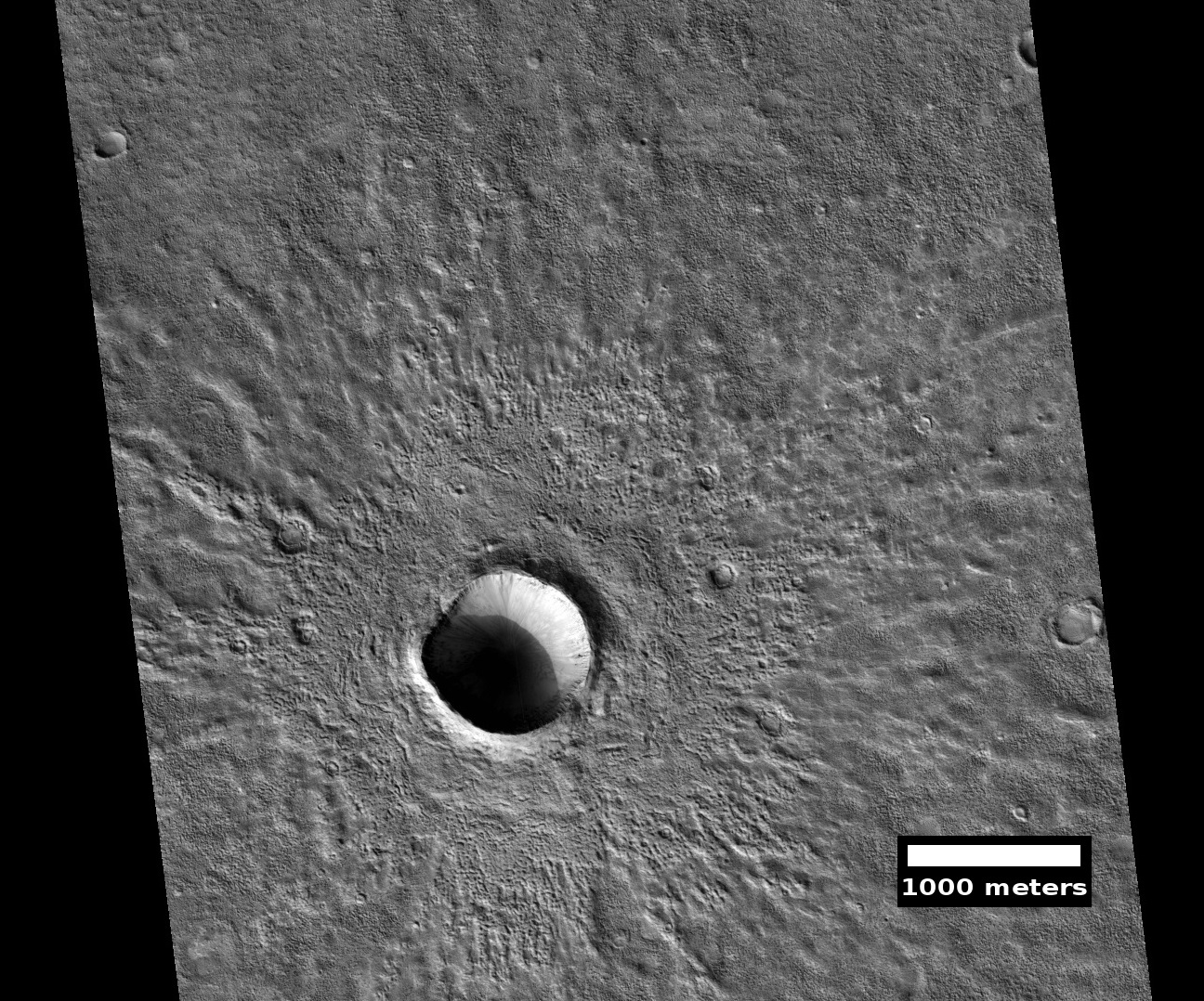
Fresh crater, as seen by HiRISE under HiWish program.

Impact craters generally have a rim with ejecta around them; in contrast volcanic craters usually do not have a rim or ejecta deposits. As craters get larger (greater than 10 km in diameter), they usually have a central peak. The peak is caused by a rebound of the crater floor following the impact. Sometimes craters will display layers in their walls. Since the collision that produces a crater is like a powerful explosion, rocks from deep underground are tossed unto the surface. Hence, craters are useful for showing us what lies deep under the surface.

== Fretted terrain ==
The Ismenius Lacus quadrangle contains several interesting features such as fretted terrain, parts of which are found in Deuteronilus Mensae and Protonilus Mensae. Fretted terrain contains smooth, flat lowlands along with steep cliffs. The scarps or cliffs are usually 1 to 2 km high. Channels in the area have wide, flat floors and steep walls. Many buttes and mesas are present. In fretted terrain the land seems to transition from narrow straight valleys to isolated mesas. Most of the mesas are surrounded by forms that have been called a variety of names: circum-mesa aprons, debris aprons, rock glaciers, and lobate debris aprons.

Fretted terrain and fretted channels in northeastern Arabia Terra are among the least understood landscapes on Mars, and the timing and nature of their formation remains a puzzle according to researchers who studied available photos. In their paper of 2026, they suggest that fretted channels are closely related to the actions of volcanos and snow/ice accumulation.

At first some features appeared to resemble rock glaciers on Earth. But scientists could not be sure. Even after the Mars Global Surveyor (MGS) Mars Orbiter Camera (MOC) took a variety of pictures of fretted terrain, experts could not tell for sure if material was moving or flowing as it would in an ice-rich deposit (glacier). Eventually, proof of their true nature was discovered by radar studies with the Mars Reconnaissance Orbiter showed that they contain pure water ice covered with a thin layer of rocks that insulated the ice.

== Glaciers ==
Glaciers formed much of the observable surface in large areas of Mars. Some look just like alpine glaciers on Earth. Much of the area in high latitudes, especially the Ismenius Lacus quadrangle, is believed to still contain enormous amounts of water ice. In March 2010, scientists released the results of a radar study of an area called Deuteronilus Mensae that found widespread evidence of ice lying beneath a few meters of rock debris. The ice was probably deposited as snowfall during an earlier climate when the poles were tilted more.

Analysis of SHARAD data led researchers to conclude that martian glaciers are 80% pure ice. The paper authors examined five different sites and all showed high levels of pure water ice.

Because of the high purity of the ice content that was found, the authors argued that the formation of glaciers happened by atmospheric precipitation or direct condensation. After glaciers were formed there was a time when enhanced sublimation formed a lag layer or promoted the accumulation of dry debris atop the water ice glacier. Those dry debris would then insulate the underlying ice from going away.

It would be difficult to take a hike on the fretted terrain where glaciers are common because the surface is folded, pitted, and often covered with linear striations. The striations show the direction of movement. Much of this rough texture is due to sublimation of buried ice. The ice goes directly into a gas (this process is called sublimation) and leaves behind an empty space. Overlying material then collapses into the void. Glaciers are not pure ice; they contain dirt and rocks. At times, they will dump their load of materials into ridges. Such ridges are called moraines. Some places on Mars have groups of ridges that are twisted around; this may have been due to more movement after the ridges were put into place. Sometimes chunks of ice fall from the glacier and get buried in the land surface. When they melt, a more or less round hole remains. On Earth we call these features kettles or kettle holes. Mendon Ponds Park in upstate New York has preserved several of these kettles. The picture from HiRISE below shows possible kettles in Moreux Crater.

== Climate change caused ice-rich features ==
Many features on Mars, especially ones found in the Ismenius Lacus quadrangle, are believed to contain large amounts of ice. The most popular model for the origin of the ice is climate change from large changes in the tilt of the planet's rotational axis. At times the tilt has even been greater than 80 degrees Large changes in the tilt explains many ice-rich features on Mars.

Studies have shown that when the tilt of Mars reaches 45 degrees from its current 25 degrees, ice is no longer stable at the poles. Furthermore, at this high tilt, stores of solid carbon dioxide (dry ice) sublimate, thereby increasing the atmospheric pressure. This increased pressure allows more dust to be held in the atmosphere. Moisture in the atmosphere will fall as snow or as ice frozen onto dust grains. Calculations suggest this material will concentrate in the mid-latitudes. General circulation models of the Martian atmosphere predict accumulations of ice-rich dust in the same areas where ice-rich features are found. When the tilt begins to return to lower values, the ice sublimates (turns directly to a gas) and leaves behind a lag of dust. The lag deposit caps the underlying material so with each cycle of high tilt levels, some ice-rich mantle remains behind. Note that the smooth surface mantle layer probably represents only relative recent material.

== Pits and cracks ==
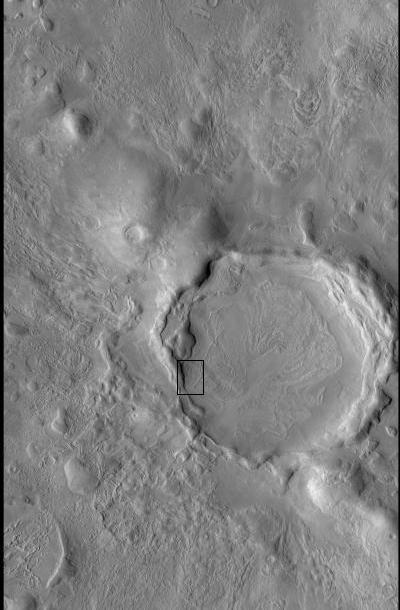
CTX Image in Protonilus Mensae, showing location of next image

Some places in the Ismenius Lacus quadrangle display large numbers of cracks and pits. It is widely believed that these are the result of ground ice sublimating (changing directly from a solid to a gas). After the ice leaves, the ground collapses in the shape of pits and cracks. The pits may come first. When enough pits form, they unite to form cracks.

== Ocean ==
Many researchers have suggested that Mars once had a great ocean in the north. Much evidence for this ocean has been gathered over several decades. New evidence was published in May 2016. A large team of scientists described how some of the surface in Ismenius Lacus quadrangle was altered by two tsunamis. The tsunamis were caused by asteroids striking the ocean. Both were thought to have been strong enough to create 30 km diameter craters. The first tsunami picked up and carried boulders the size of cars or small houses. The backwash from the wave formed channels by rearranging the boulders. The second came in when the ocean was 300 m lower. The second carried a great deal of ice which was dropped in valleys. Calculations show that the average height of the waves would have been 50 m, but the heights would vary from 10 m to 120 m. Numerical simulations show that in this particular part of the ocean two impact craters of the size of 30 km in diameter would form every 30 million years. The implication here is that a great northern ocean may have existed for millions of years. One argument against an ocean has been the lack of shoreline features. These features may have been washed away by these tsunami events. The parts of Mars studied in this research are Chryse Planitia and northwestern Arabia Terra. These tsunamis affected some surfaces in the Ismenius Lacus quadrangle and in the Mare Acidalium quadrangle.

== See also ==
- Climate of Mars
- Deuteronilus Mensae
- Dunes
- Fretted terrain
- Glacier
- Glaciers on Mars
- Gully (Mars)
- HiRISE
- Impact crater
- List of quadrangles on Mars
- Lobate debris apron
- Lyot Crater
- Polygonal patterned ground
- Protonilus Mensae
- Ring mold crater
- Upper Plains Unit
- Vallis
- Water on Mars

MC-01 Mare Boreum (features)
MC-02 Diacria (features)		MC-03 Arcadia (features)	MC-04 Acidalium (features)	MC-05 Ismenius Lacus (features)		MC-06 Casius (features)	MC-07 Cebrenia (features)
MC-08 Amazonis (features)	MC-09 Tharsis (features)	MC-10 Lunae Palus (features)	MC-11 Oxia Palus (features)	MC-12 Arabia (features)	MC-13 Syrtis Major (features)	MC-14 Amenthes (features)	MC-15 Elysium (features)
MC-16 Memnonia (features)	MC-17 Phoenicis Lacus (features)	MC-18 Coprates (features)	MC-19 Margaritifer Sinus (features)	MC-20 Sinus Sabaeus (features)	MC-21 Iapygia (features)	MC-22 Mare Tyrrhenum (features)	MC-23 Aeolis (features)
MC-24 Phaethontis (features)		MC-25 Thaumasia (features)	MC-26 Argyre (features)	MC-27 Noachis (features)		MC-28 Hellas (features)	MC-29 Eridania (features)
MC-30 Mare Australe (features)
