= Wittenberg =

Town in Saxony-Anhalt, Germany

Wittenberg Lutherstadt Wittenberg
- Town
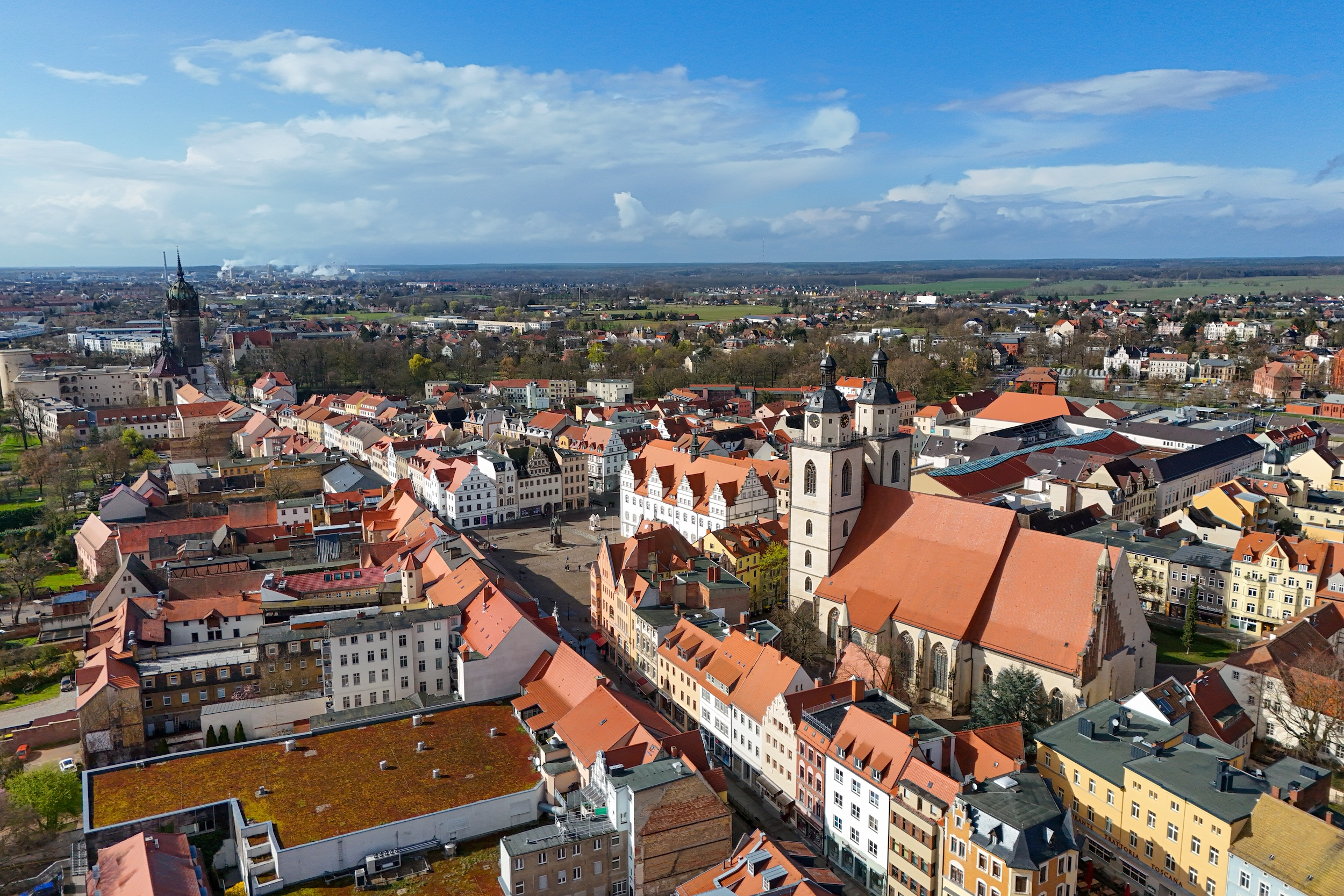
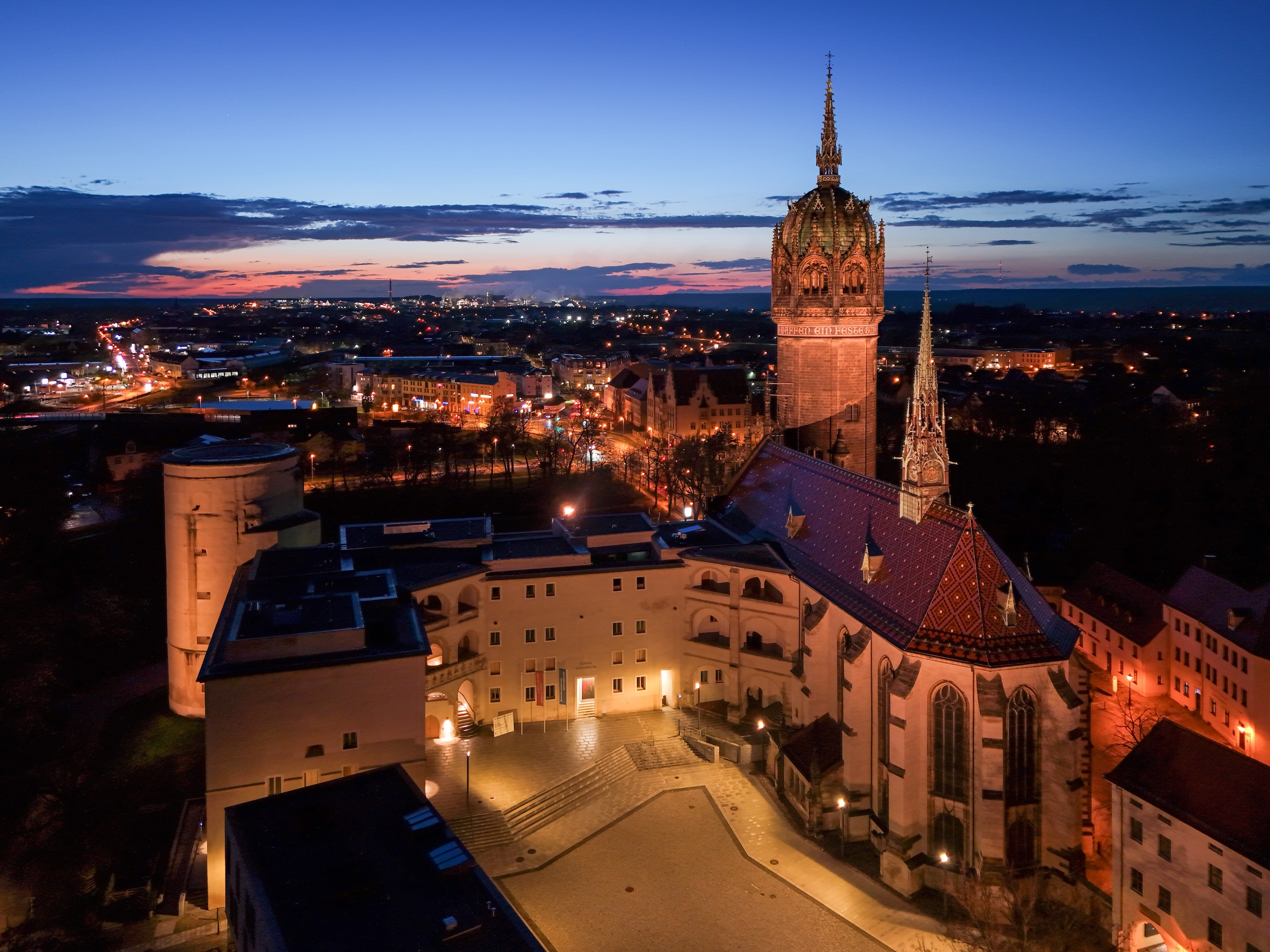
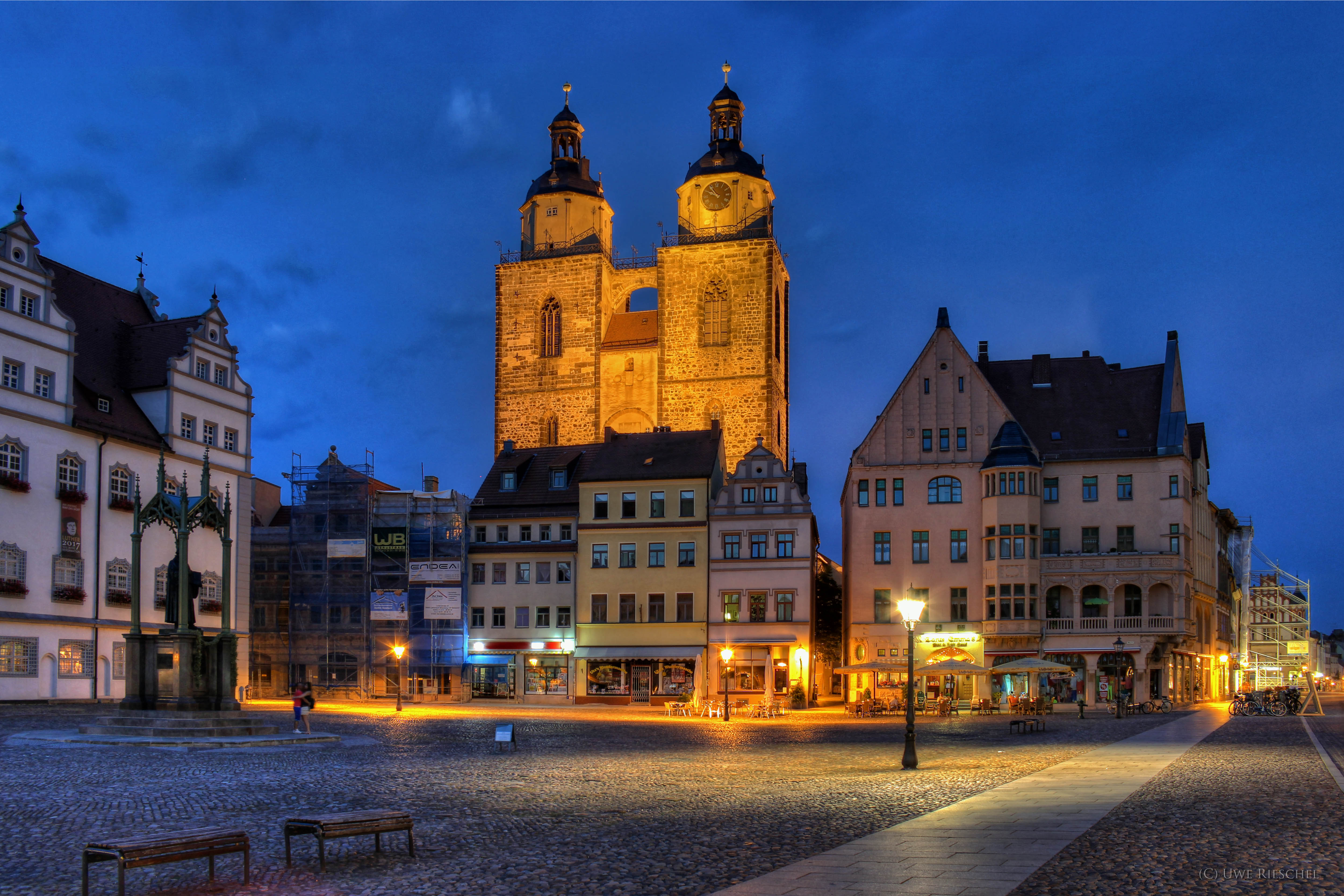
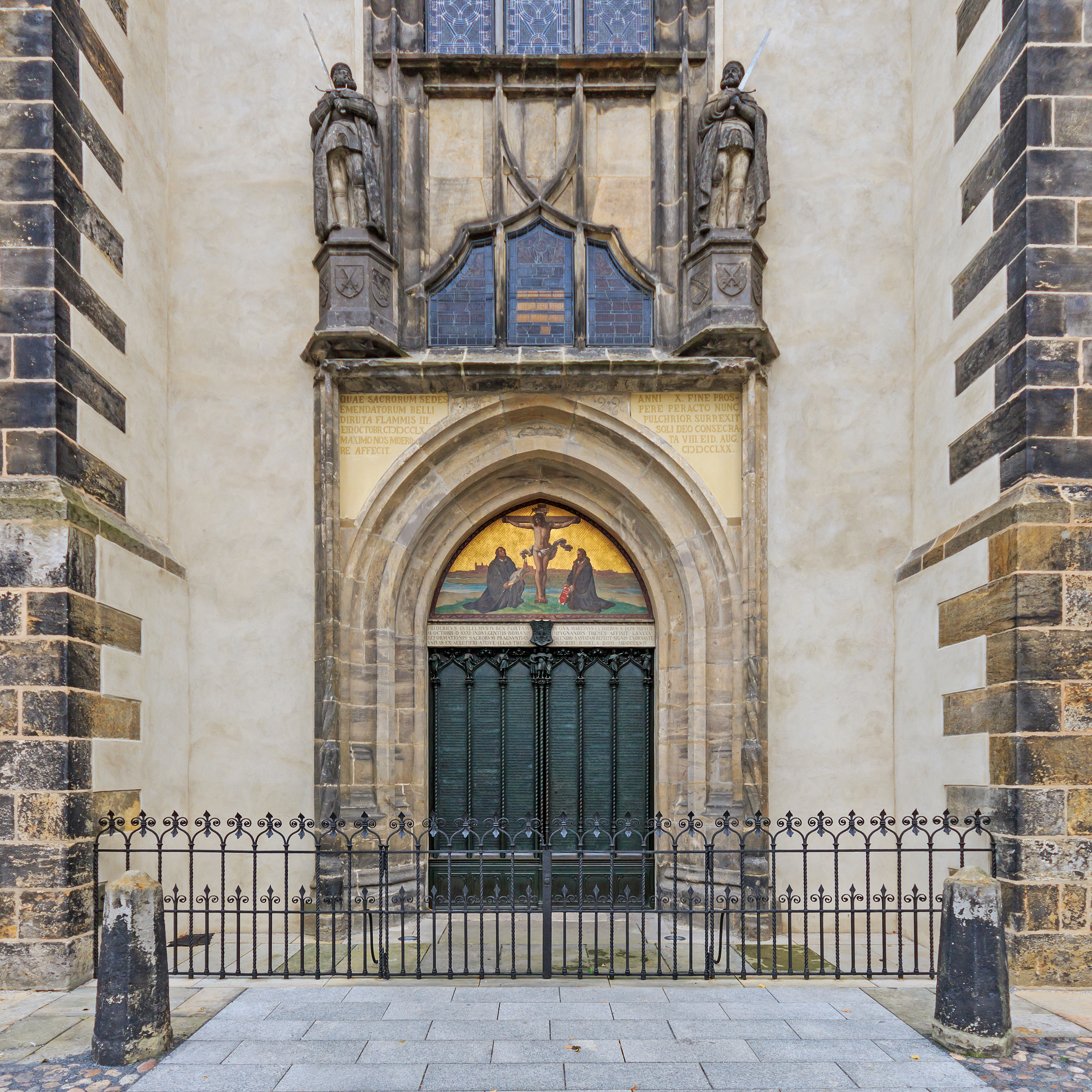
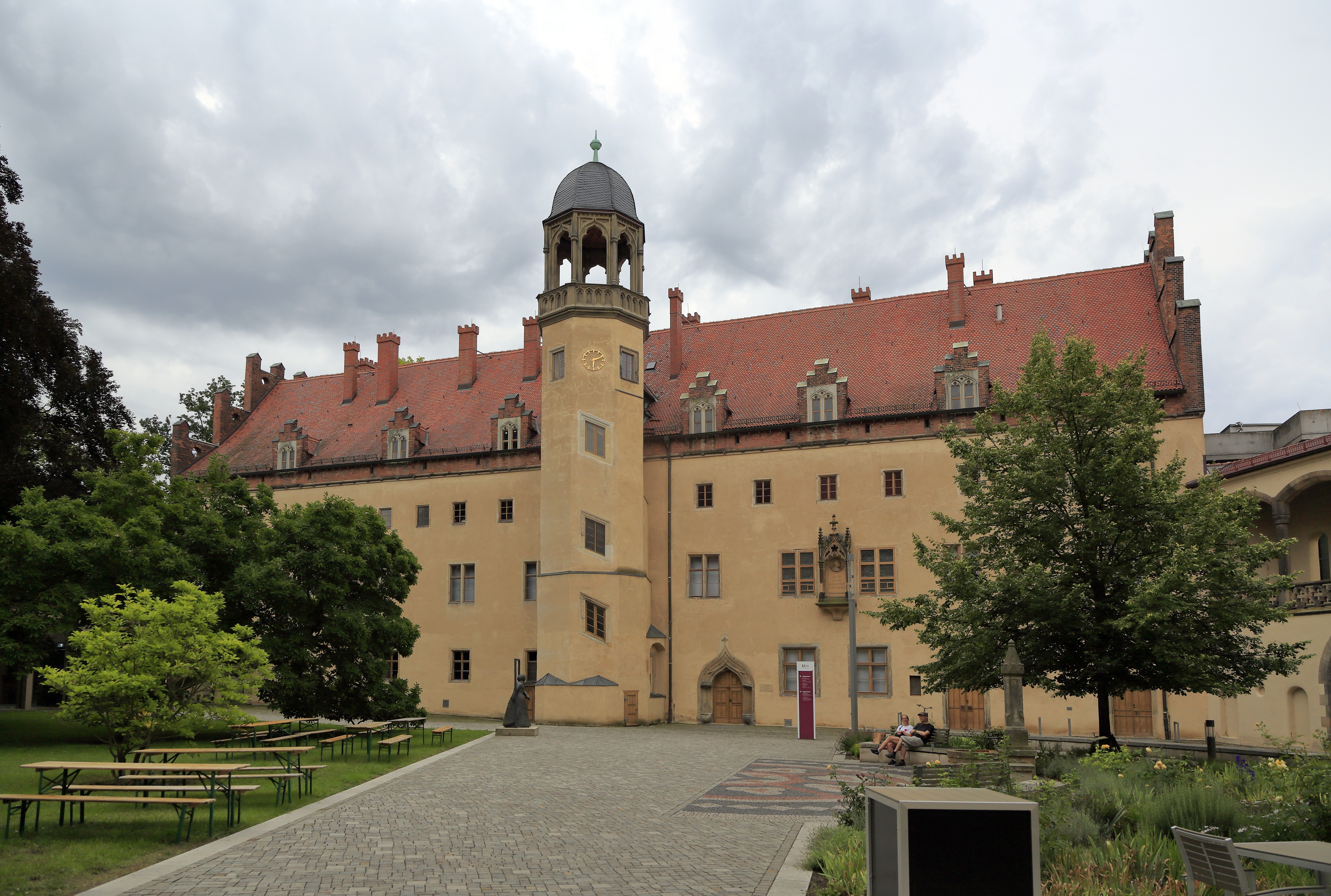
- View of Wittenberg Schlosskirche Stadtkirche Theses Doors Lutherhaus

- Coat of arms

- Location of Wittenberg within Wittenberg district
- Interactive map of Wittenberg
- Location within Germany Location within Saxony-Anhalt
- Coordinates: 51.8671°N 12.6484°E
- Country: Germany
- State: Saxony-Anhalt
- District: Wittenberg

Government
  - Mayor (2022–29): Torsten Zugehör (Ind.)

Area
  - Total: 240.41 km^{2} (92.82 sq mi)
- Elevation: 67 m (220 ft)

Population (2025-12-31)
  - Total: 44,937
  - Density: 186.92/km^{2} (484.12/sq mi)
- Time zone: UTC+01:00 (CET)
  - Summer (DST): UTC+02:00 (CEST)
- Postal codes: 06886
- Dialling codes: 03491
- Vehicle registration: WB
- Website: wittenberg.de

Wittenberg, (Note: /ˈwɪtənbɜːrɡ, ˈvɪt-/ WIT-ən-burg, VIT-, German: [ˈvɪtn̩bɛʁk]) officially Lutherstadt Wittenberg, (Note: German: [ˈluːtɐʃtat ˈvɪtn̩bɛʁk], lit. 'Luther Town Wittenberg') is the fourth-largest town in the state of Saxony-Anhalt, Germany. It is situated on the River Elbe, 60 kilometers (37 mi) north of Leipzig and 90 kilometers (56 mi) south-west of Berlin. It has a population of 46,008 (2018).

Wittenberg's honorific title Lutherstadt stems from its close connections with the theologian Martin Luther and the Reformation, usually taken to have begun in the town, marking the birth of Protestantism. Several of Wittenberg's buildings are associated with these historical and religious events, including a preserved part of the Augustinian monastery in which Luther lived, first as a celibate monk and later as property owner with his later wife Katharina von Bora and family. Wittenberg was also the seat of the prince Elector of Saxony, a dignity held by the dukes of the Duchy of Saxe-Wittenberg, making it one of the most powerful cities in the Holy Roman Empire. Following the Congress of Vienna the town was transferred to the Kingdom of Prussia. Largely spared destruction during the Second World War, it later became part of East Germany.

Today, Wittenberg is an industrial centre and tourist destination, best known for its intact historic center and various memorial sites dedicated to Luther and his collaborator, fellow theologian Philip Melanchthon. The buildings associated with those two figures were added to the UNESCO World Heritage list in 1996, along with other sites in Eisleben, because of their religious significance and testimony to one of the most influential movements of medieval Europe.

== History ==
Historical affiliations

Duchy of Saxony 1180–1296
Duchy of Saxe-Wittenberg 1296–1356
Electorate of Saxony 1356–1806
Kingdom of Saxony 1806–1815
Kingdom of Prussia 1815–1871
German Empire 1871–1918
Weimar Republic 1918–1933
Nazi Germany 1933–1945
(Allied-occupied Germany) Soviet occupation zone 1945–1949
East Germany 1949–1990
Germany 1990–present

Historical documents first mention the settlement in 1180 as a small village founded by Flemish colonists under the rule of the House of Ascania. In 1260 this village became the residence of the dukes of Saxe-Wittenberg, and in 1293 the settlement was granted its town charter as a free-standing town.

Wittenberg developed into an important trade centre during the following few centuries because of its central location. When the local branch of the Ascanians died out in 1422, control of Saxe-Wittenberg passed to the House of Wettin. The town became an important regional political and cultural centre at the end of the 15th century when Frederick III ("the Wise"), the Elector of Saxony from 1486 to 1525, made his residence in Wittenberg. Several parts of the boundaries of the town were extended soon afterwards. The second bridge over the Elbe River was built between 1487 and 1490 and the Castle Church (Schlosskirche) was erected between 1496 and 1506. The Elector's palace was rebuilt at the same time.

In 1502, Elector Frederick founded the University of Wittenberg, which attracted some writers such as Martin Luther, a professor of theology beginning in 1508, and Philipp Melanchthon, a professor of Greek and subsequently Luther's friend and disciple, starting a decade later in 1518.

On 31 October 1517, Luther nailed his "Ninety-five Theses" against the selling of indulgences to the door of the Castle Church, an event taken as marking the beginning of the Protestant Reformation and the start of a major branch of Western Christianity, Lutheranism. The Anabaptist movement had one of its earliest homes in Wittenberg, when the Zwickau prophets moved there in late 1521, only to be suppressed by Luther when he returned from the Wartburg in spring of 1522.

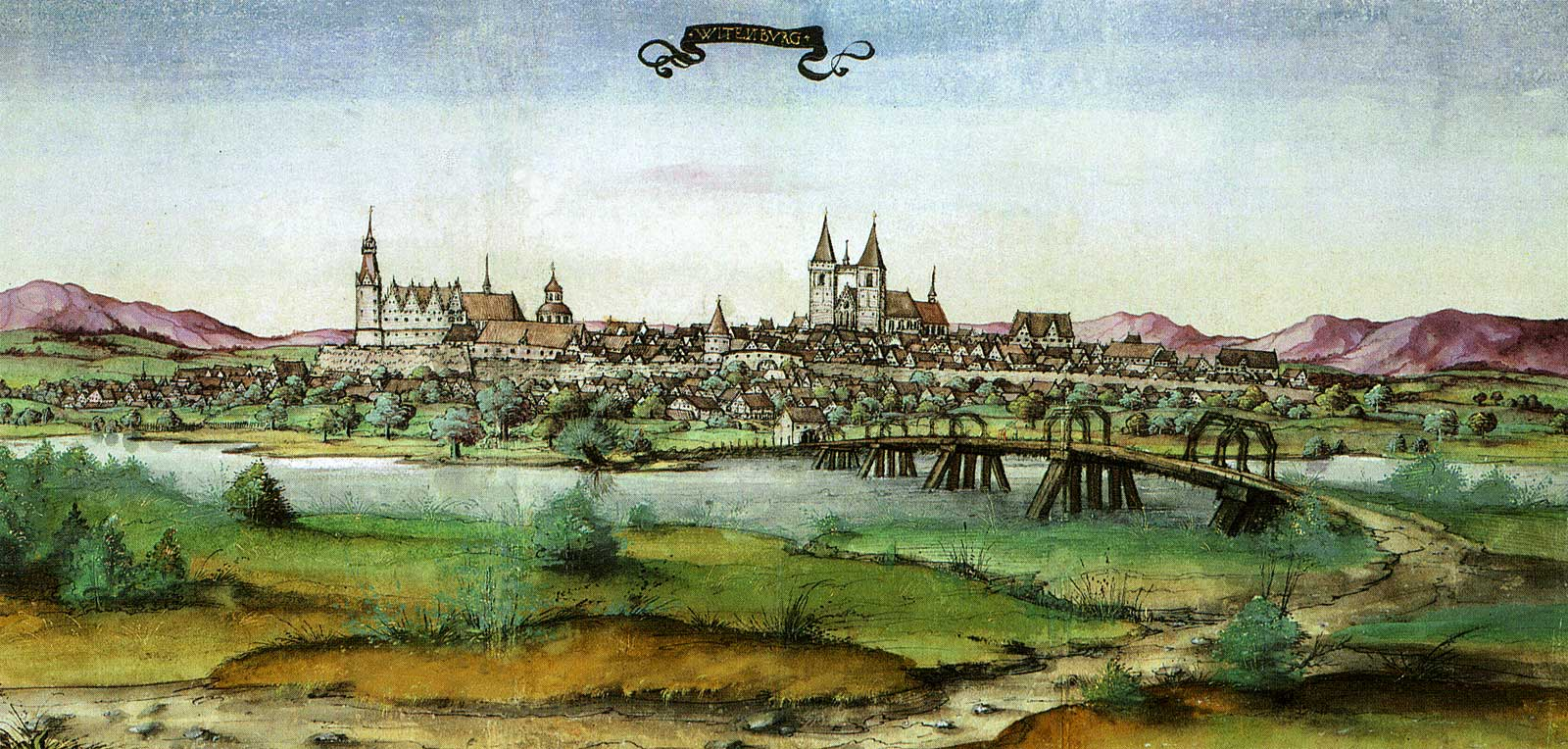
Wittenberg, 1536

The Capitulation of Wittenberg (1547) is the name given to the treaty by which John Frederick the Magnanimous was compelled to resign the electoral dignity and most of his territory to the Albertine branch of the noble House of Wettin.

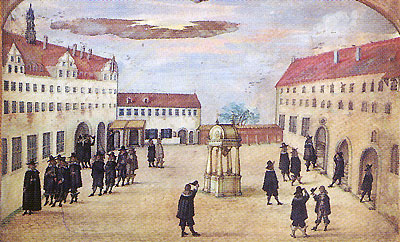
University of Wittenberg in 1644

In 1760, during the Seven Years' War, the Austrians bombarded the town, which was then occupied by the Prussians. The French took control in 1806, and Napoleon commanded the refortification of the town in 1813. In 1814, the Prussian Army under Tauentzien stormed Wittenberg; he received the title of "von Wittenberg" as a reward. Wittenberg became part of Prussia a year later following the fall of Napoleon and negotiations at the Congress of Vienna, administered within the Province of Saxony. Wittenberg continued to be a fortress of the third class until the reorganisation of German defences after the foundation of the new German Empire led to its dismantling in 1873.

From 1914 to 1918, during the First World War, a 10 1/2-acre (4.2 ha) camp was set up two miles from the town at Klein Wittenberg. Eight compounds held 13,000 men. During the typhus epidemic of 1914–1915, conditions were harsh. The camp medical officer, Dr. Aschenbach, was awarded the Iron Cross for his part in the epidemic. The award was questioned by the Allies. The use of dogs to attack POW's was criticised by American Ambassador James W. Gerard in his book "Four Years in Germany".

Unlike many other historic German cities during World War II, Wittenberg's town centre was spared destruction during the conflict. The Allies agreed not to bomb Wittenberg, though fighting took place in the town, with bullet pock-marks visible on the statues of Luther and Melanchthon in the market square – or so the popular version of the town's history goes. In fact the Luther statue was not present in the town square during much of the war but in storage at Luther Brunnen, a roadhouse a few kilometres north of the town.

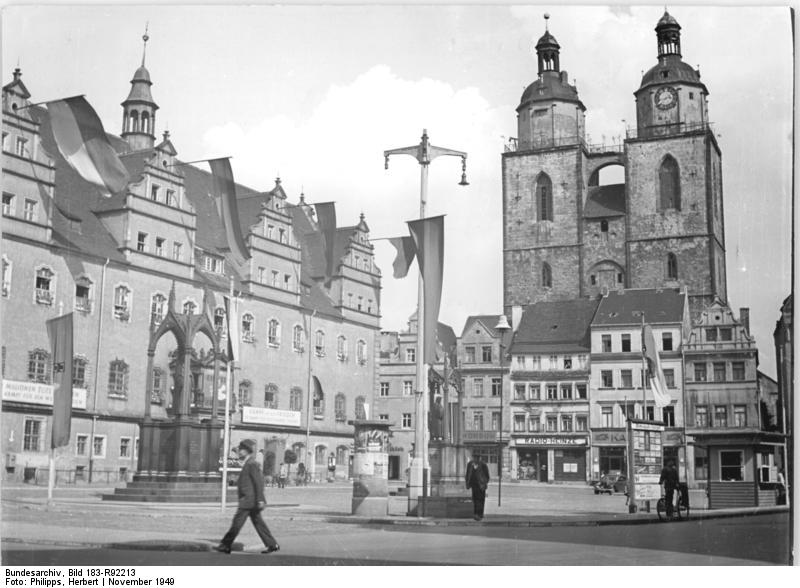
Market square in 1949

Wittenberg's reputation as a town protected from Allied bombing is largely accurate. However, just outside Wittenberg the government had built the Arado Flugzeugwerke (the Arado Aircraft Factory), which produced components of airplanes for the Luftwaffe. The war factory was worked by Jews, Russians, Poles, political prisoners and even a few Americans—all prisoners engaging in forced labour, including prisoners-of-war who were nominally exempt from such labor. American and British planes bombed the factory near the end of the war, resulting in the death of over one thousand POWs. The 1995 publication of "...und morgen war Krieg!" by Renate Gruber-Lieblich attempts to document the tragic bombing outside Wittenberg.

In 1945, Wittenberg issued 19 of its own postage stamps, each depicting Hitler but with a large black round overprint covering his face. At the end of the war, Soviet forces occupied Wittenberg; it became part of East Germany in 1949. During the East German period, it formed part of Halle District. By means of the peaceful revolution in 1989, the communist régime dissolved and the town has been governed democratically since 1990.

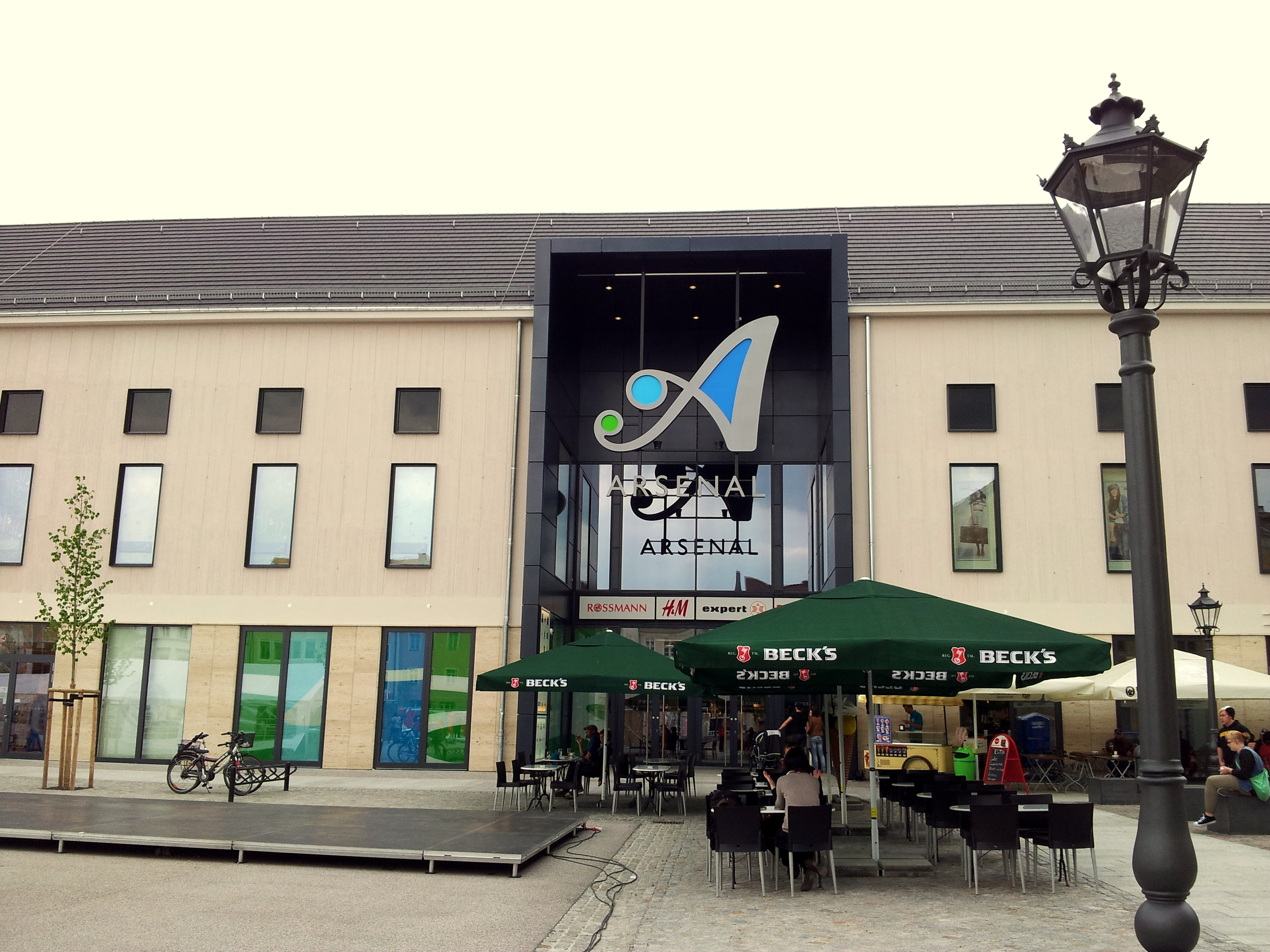
Arsenal shopping centre, opened in 2012

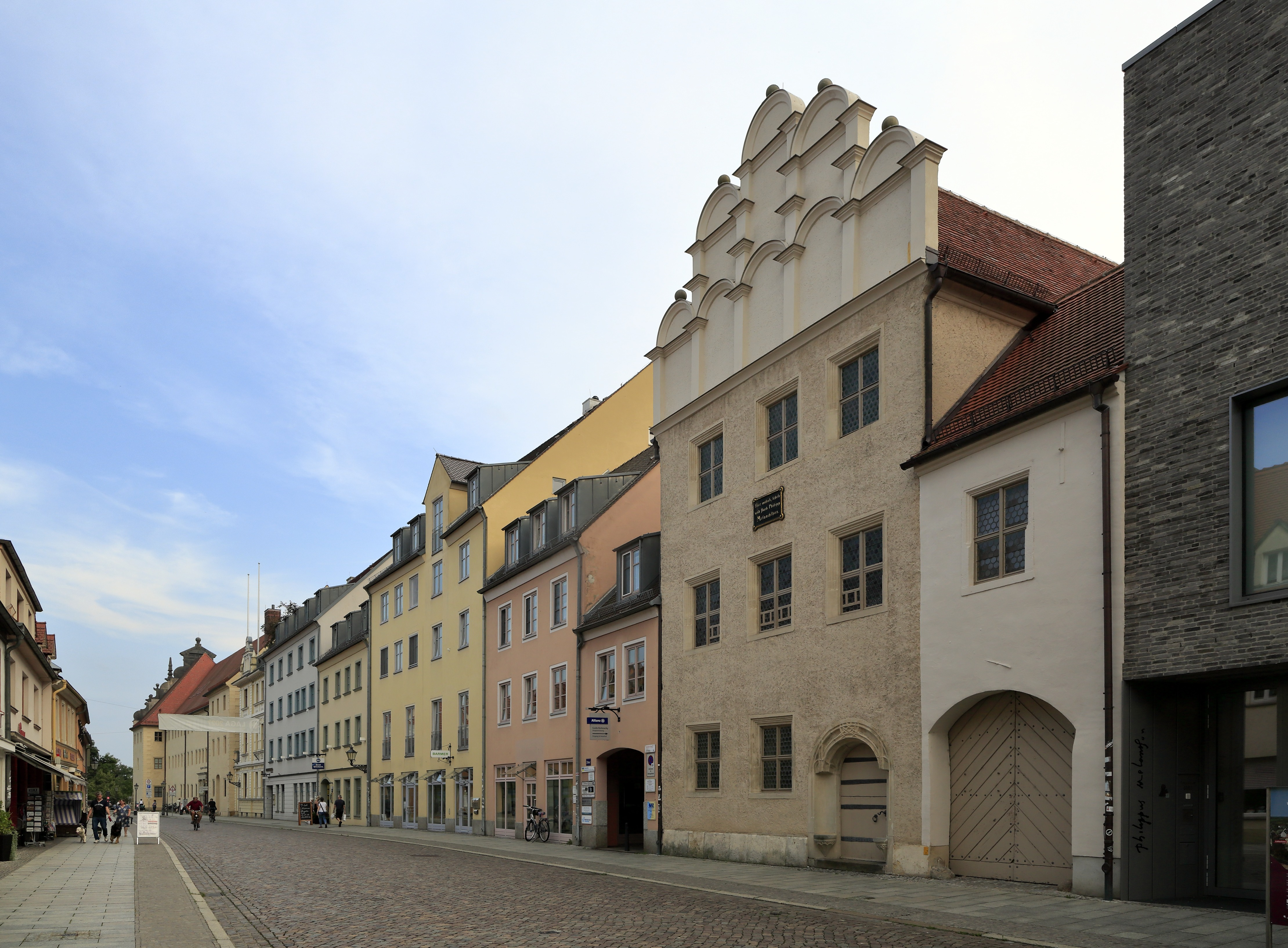
Restored houses in the city center, 2023

Wittenberg is currently characterized by renovation and new construction work, an economic recovery and tourism development as a "place of pilgrimage for the Reformation". With the Luther Decade starting in 2008, the city began preparing for the 500th anniversary of the Reformation, which took place in 2017. Numerous buildings have been restored, the infrastructure has been partially renewed and numerous new attractions have been created in the city (e.g. the new Lutherstadt Wittenberg Hauptbahnhof, Arsenal shopping centre, Luthergarden or the Panometer).

In 2014 Lutherstadt Wittenberg was awarded the honorary title European City of the Reformation by the Community of Protestant Churches in Europe.

=== Historical population ===
The figures are given for the metropolitan district at the point in time. Up to 1791 the figures are generally estimated, later figures are from census or local authorities.

Historical population

Year	Pop.	±% p.a.
1500	2,000	—
1532	4,500	+2.57%
1791	4,860	+0.03%
1792	4,703	−3.23%
1793	4,662	−0.87%
1794	4,617	−0.97%
1814	4,727	+0.12%
1826	6,725	+2.98%
1834	8,107	+2.36%
1846	10,283	+2.00%
1875	12,479	+0.67%
1880	13,448	+1.51%
1885	13,836	+0.57%
1890	14,443	+0.86%
1895	16,479	+2.67%

Year	Pop.	±% p.a.
1900	18,345	+2.17%
1905	20,331	+2.08%
1910	22,419	+1.97%
1925	24,160	+0.50%
1939	35,130	+2.71%
1946	41,304	+2.34%
1950	49,852	+4.81%
1964	46,828	−0.45%
1971	47,323	+0.15%
1981	53,874	+1.30%
1989	51,754	−0.50%
1990	49,682	−4.00%
1992	55,096	+5.31%
1995	53,207	−1.16%
2000	49,643	−1.38%

Year	Pop.	±% p.a.
2005	47,805	−0.75%
2006	46,776	−2.15%
2007	45,615	−2.48%
2008	47,695	+4.56%
2009	50,113	+5.07%
2010	49,496	−1.23%
2011	49,076	−0.85%
2012	46,930	−4.37%
2013	46,729	−0.43%
2020	45,425	−0.40%
2022	45,061	−0.40%
2023	45,126	+0.14%
2024	45,249	+0.27%
2025	46,765	+3.35%

Source: 2012 census.

== Divisions ==
The town Wittenberg consists of Wittenberg proper and the following Ortschaften or municipal divisions:

- Abtsdorf
- Apollensdorf
- Boßdorf
- Griebo
- Kropstädt
- Mochau
- Nudersdorf
- Pratau
- Reinsdorf
- Schmilkendorf
- Seegrehna
- Straach

== Climate ==
Wittenberg has a typical oceanic climate (Köppen: Cfb; Trewartha: Dobk) with cool winters and warm summers. The average temperature in Wittenberg ranges from 1 °C (34 °F) in winter to 19 °C (66 °F) in summer, with the average temperature from May to September being above 10 °C (50 °F). Winter begins in early October and spring begins in mid-April of the following year. There are 14.1 days of daytime high temperatures exceeding 30 °C (86 °F) each year, and about 18 days of daytime maximum temperatures below freezing each winter.

The Wittenberg weather station has recorded the following extreme values:

- Highest Temperature 38.5 °C (101.3 °F) on 9 August 1992.
- Warmest Minimum 22.6 °C (72.7 °F) on 7 August 2015.
- Coldest Maximum −17.4 °C (0.7 °F) on 1 February 1956.
- Lowest Temperature −24.6 °C (−12.3 °F) on 2 February 1956.
- Highest Daily Precipitation 97.4 mm (3.83 in) on 27 July 2016.
- Wettest Month 177.2 mm (6.98 in) in July 1954.
- Wettest Year 786.0 mm (30.94 in) in 2007.
- Driest Year 308.0 mm (12.13 in) in 2018.
- Earliest Snowfall: 30 October 1940.
- Latest Snowfall: 29 April 1985.
- Longest annual sunshine: 2,117.7 hours in 2018.
- Shortest annual sunshine: 1,388.1 hours in 1977.

Climate data for Wittenberg (1991–2020 normals, extremes 1937–present)
Month	Jan	Feb	Mar	Apr	May	Jun	Jul	Aug	Sep	Oct	Nov	Dec	Year
Record high °C (°F)	15.9 (60.6)	19.1 (66.4)	25.0 (77.0)	32.0 (89.6)	33.3 (91.9)	38.0 (100.4)	37.8 (100.0)	38.5 (101.3)	33.9 (93.0)	28.0 (82.4)	21.2 (70.2)	17.8 (64.0)	38.5 (101.3)
Mean maximum °C (°F)	10.9 (51.6)	12.7 (54.9)	17.9 (64.2)	24.2 (75.6)	28.7 (83.7)	31.9 (89.4)	33.4 (92.1)	33.1 (91.6)	27.5 (81.5)	21.8 (71.2)	15.1 (59.2)	11.6 (52.9)	35.2 (95.4)
Mean daily maximum °C (°F)	3.5 (38.3)	5.0 (41.0)	9.3 (48.7)	15.2 (59.4)	19.8 (67.6)	23.1 (73.6)	25.4 (77.7)	25.1 (77.2)	20.1 (68.2)	14.1 (57.4)	7.9 (46.2)	4.3 (39.7)	14.4 (57.9)
Daily mean °C (°F)	0.8 (33.4)	1.7 (35.1)	4.9 (40.8)	9.8 (49.6)	14.3 (57.7)	17.5 (63.5)	19.6 (67.3)	19.2 (66.6)	14.7 (58.5)	9.7 (49.5)	4.9 (40.8)	1.8 (35.2)	9.9 (49.8)
Mean daily minimum °C (°F)	−1.7 (28.9)	−1.4 (29.5)	1.0 (33.8)	4.5 (40.1)	8.6 (47.5)	11.9 (53.4)	14.1 (57.4)	13.8 (56.8)	10.0 (50.0)	5.9 (42.6)	2.1 (35.8)	−0.7 (30.7)	5.7 (42.3)
Mean minimum °C (°F)	−11.7 (10.9)	−9.0 (15.8)	−4.9 (23.2)	−2.1 (28.2)	2.2 (36.0)	6.3 (43.3)	8.9 (48.0)	8.2 (46.8)	4.5 (40.1)	−0.6 (30.9)	−4.3 (24.3)	−8.4 (16.9)	−13.6 (7.5)
Record low °C (°F)	−23.1 (−9.6)	−24.6 (−12.3)	−17.9 (−0.2)	−6.7 (19.9)	−2.6 (27.3)	0.9 (33.6)	5.4 (41.7)	3.8 (38.8)	0.1 (32.2)	−5.8 (21.6)	−15.5 (4.1)	−22.2 (−8.0)	−24.6 (−12.3)
Average precipitation mm (inches)	50.1 (1.97)	33.8 (1.33)	40.3 (1.59)	29.8 (1.17)	48.2 (1.90)	55.1 (2.17)	69.2 (2.72)	56.0 (2.20)	48.0 (1.89)	40.7 (1.60)	45.0 (1.77)	46.4 (1.83)	565.3 (22.26)
Average extreme snow depth cm (inches)	7.1 (2.8)	6.7 (2.6)	3.2 (1.3)	0.5 (0.2)	0 (0)	0 (0)	0 (0)	0 (0)	0 (0)	0 (0)	1.6 (0.6)	5.9 (2.3)	12.9 (5.1)
Average precipitation days (≥ 1.0 mm)	16.9	13.9	14.8	11.0	12.5	12.1	13.8	12.7	11.5	14.1	15.0	16.7	164.8
Average snowy days	9.3	7.7	2.6	0.3	0	0	0	0	0	0	1.3	5.8	27
Average relative humidity (%)	85.8	81.3	75.9	66.8	66.5	66.6	66.7	67.2	74.9	82.1	87.8	87.6	75.8
Mean monthly sunshine hours	58.1	78.6	123.8	187.5	222.7	223.2	228.4	218.5	164.5	116.3	58.7	47.0	1,718.7
Source 1: World Meteorological Organization
Source 2: DWD Open Data

== Sights and culture ==
Wittenberg
UNESCO World Heritage Site
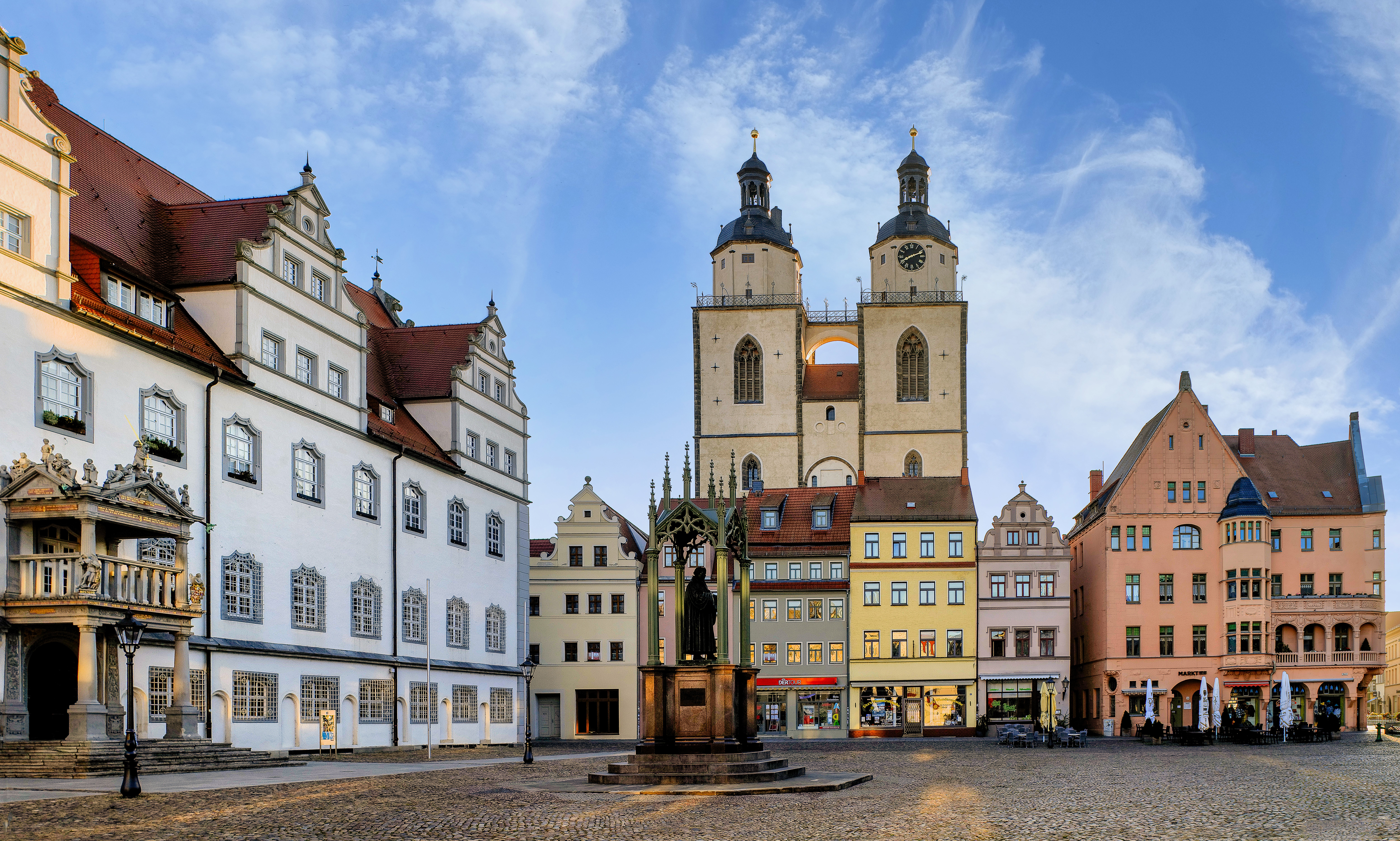
- Market square with Stadtkirche Wittenberg
- Interactive map of Wittenberg
- Part of: Luther Memorials in Eisleben and Wittenberg
- Includes: Lutherhaus, Melanchthonhaus, Stadtkirche Wittenberg and All Saints' Church, Wittenberg
- Criteria: Cultural: iv, vi
- Reference: 783
- Inscription: 1996 (20th Session)

Lutherstadt Wittenberg has a wide range of cultural sites. Most are located within the historic old town along the Wittenberg Culture Mile.

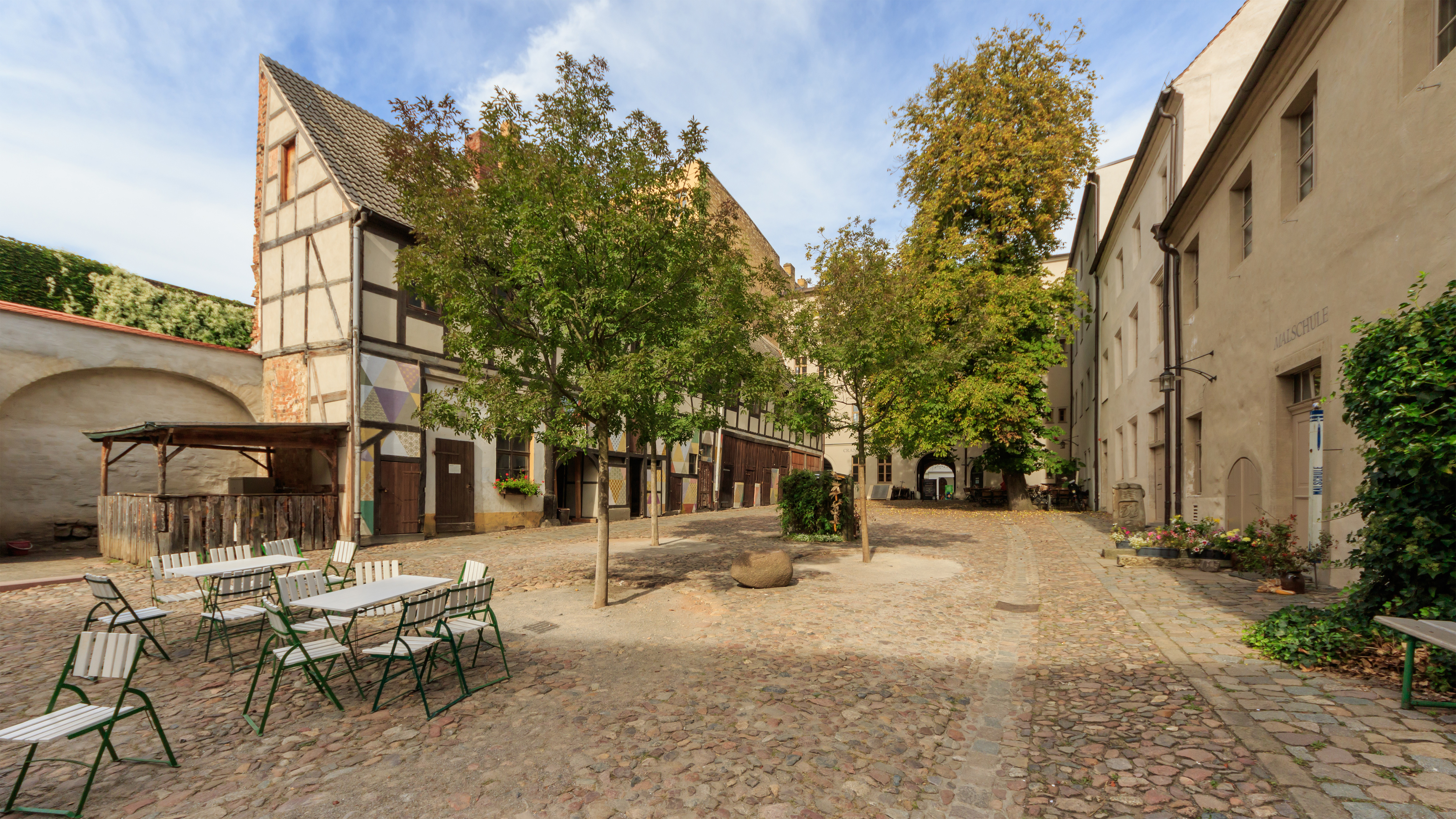
Cranachhof, one of many courtyards in Wittenberg

Wittenberg is home to numerous historical sites, as well as portraits and other paintings by Lucas Cranach the Elder and Younger. On the doors of All Saints' Church, the Schlosskirche ("castle church", built in 1496–1506) Luther is said to have nailed his 95 theses in 1517. It was seriously damaged by fire in 1760 during a bombardment by the French during the Seven Years' War, was practically rebuilt, and was later (1885–1892) restored. The wooden doors, burnt in 1760, were replaced in 1858 by bronze doors, bearing the Latin text of the theses. Inside the church are the tombs of Martin Luther, Philipp Melanchthon, Johannes Bugenhagen, Paul Eber and of the electors Frederick the Wise (by Peter Vischer the Younger, 1527) and John the Constant (by Hans Vischer), and portraits of the reformers by Lucas Cranach the Younger, who is also buried in the church.

St. Mary's Church, the parish church in which Luther often preached, was built in the 14th century, but has been much altered since Luther's time. It contains a painting by Lucas Cranach the Elder, representing the Last Supper (with the faces of Luther and other reformers), Baptism and Confession, also a font by Hermann Vischer the Elder (1457). In addition, there are numerous historic paintings in the church.

The ancient electoral palace is another of the buildings that suffered severely in 1760; it now contains archives.

Martin Luther's home, the Lutherhaus, where he studied and lived both before and after the Reformation, is now a museum containing many artifacts from his life. Melanchthon's house and the house of Lucas Cranach the Elder, mayor of Wittenberg, can also be found here. Statues of Luther (by Schadow), Melanchthon and Bugenhagen embellish the town. The spot outside the Elster Gate where Luther publicly burned the papal bull in 1520 is marked by an oak tree.

The original Wittenberg University quadrangle also lies in the city centre.

=== Buildings ===
==== Churches ====
===== Schlosskirche =====
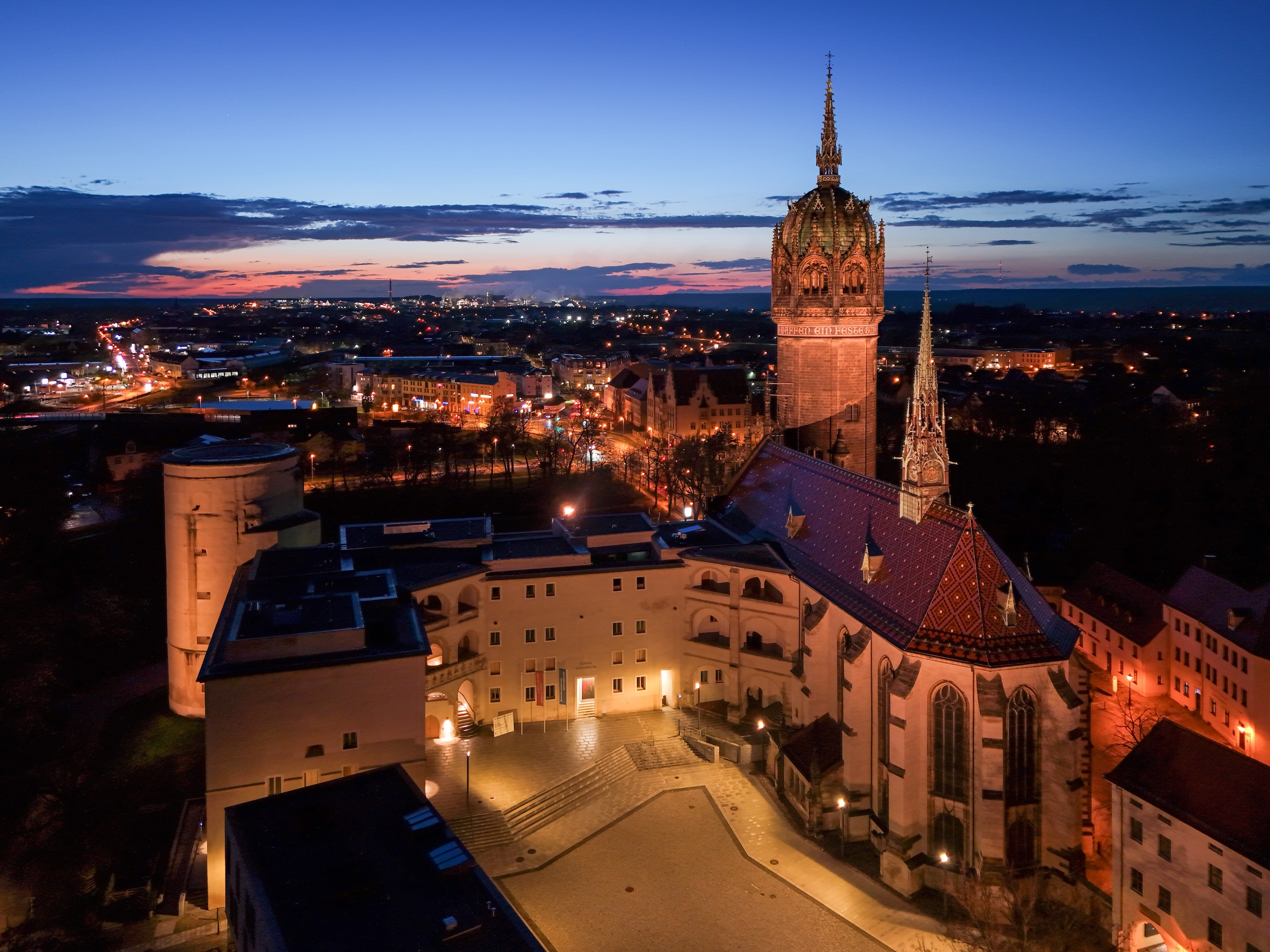
Schlosskirche at night

One of the town's main attractions is the Schlosskirche (Castle Church), most notably associated with the publication of Martin Luther's 95 Theses, a bold attack on the Roman Catholic Church's practice of indulgences. The castle church was remodelled between 1883 and 1892. According to the intentions of the builders, the world-historical significance of the castle church was to be expressed. In the spirit of the historicism period, the statement was related to the precursors and bearers of the Reformation, thus creating a Reformation memorial. On the occasion of the 500th anniversary of the posting of the theses in 2017, the church was extensively renovated.

===== Stadtkirche Wittenberg =====
St. Mary's Town Church and Parish Church is the mother church of the Reformation. The first Protestant service was held in it in 1521 by Justus Jonas the Elder and Andreas Bodenstein of Karlstadt. As Martin Luther's preaching church, it was the Reformation official church of the general superintendents of the Saxon Kurkreis. After the Congress of Vienna it became the official residence of the Wittenberg superintendents. The artistic decoration is well preserved and includes works by Lucas Cranach the Elder and Lucas Cranach the Younger. Epitaphs on the interior and exterior walls refer to the work of many important personalities. The cemetery chapel of the Holy Corpse stands to the south of the town church and once belonged to the walled cemetery area of the church.

===== Unbefleckte Empfängnis Catholic Church =====
The church on Mauerstraße was consecrated in 1872 by Bishop Konrad Martin. It was renovated in 1999/2000.

===== Christ Church =====
Christ Church was built as another church in 1907/1908 in the suburb of Kleinwittenberg in historicist forms.

==== Other buildings ====
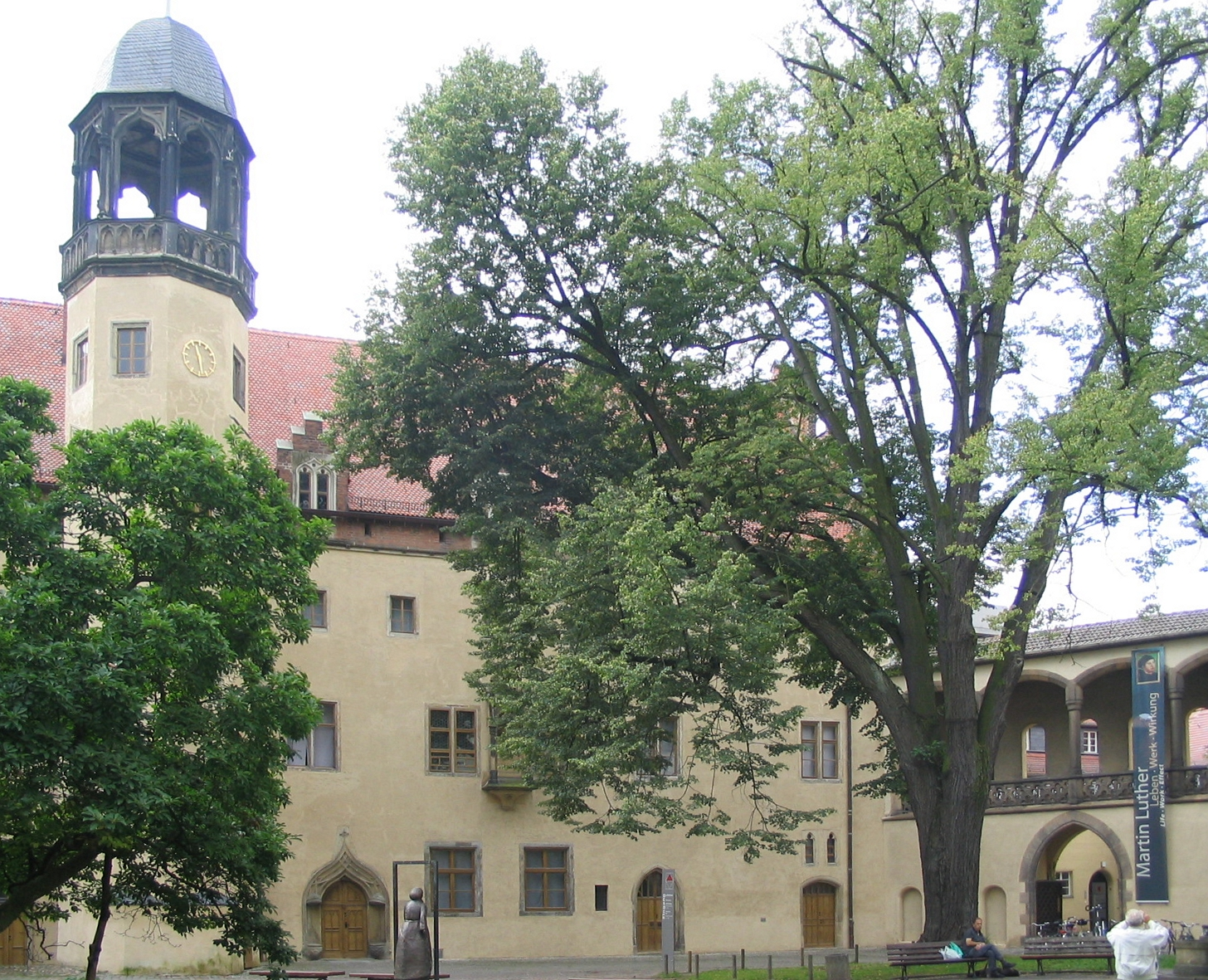
Lutherhaus

===== Augusteum and Luther House =====
The representative showcase building Augusteum was once an extension of the University of Wittenberg "Leucorea". In the inner courtyard of the Augusteum is the former home of Martin Luther. Today, the building houses the Reformation History Museum with its collections of pictures, writings and contemporary exhibits from the Reformation era

===== Melanchthon House =====
The architectural style of the Melanchthon House in Collegienstraße, which expresses the self-confident modernity of the Renaissance, is an architectural sight. In this house the reformer Philipp Melanchthon lived and died. It houses an exhibition. In 2013, the house received an extension according to plans by the architects Dietsch & Weber from Halle made of grey brick.

===== University Leucorea Wittenberg =====
Founded in 1502, the reformers Martin Luther and Melanchthon spent time at the University of Leucorea in Collegienstraße.

===== Hamlethaus =====
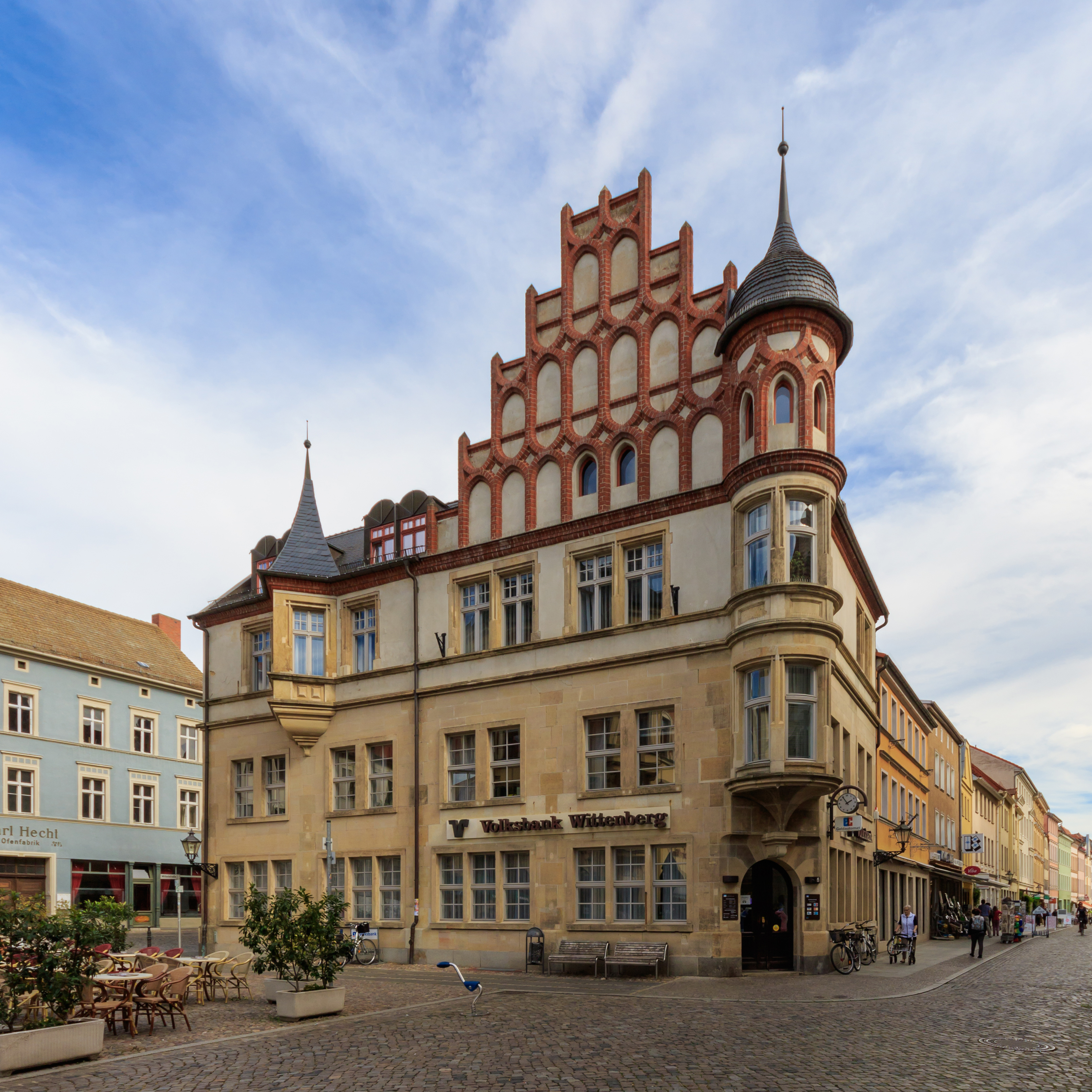
Hamlethaus

The Hamlethaus in Collegienstraße blends into the ensemble of the town.

===== Bugenhagenhaus =====
The Bugenhagen House next to the town church is the oldest Protestant vicarage in the world and is one of the most significant memorials to the Reformation. Until 1997, it was the residence and place of work of the Wittenberg superintendents without interruption since the Reformation. Johannes Bugenhagen was the first pastor to live here until his death in 1558. Between 2004 and 2007, the building was thoroughly renovated and now serves as a spiritual community and meeting centre.

===== Stadthaus =====
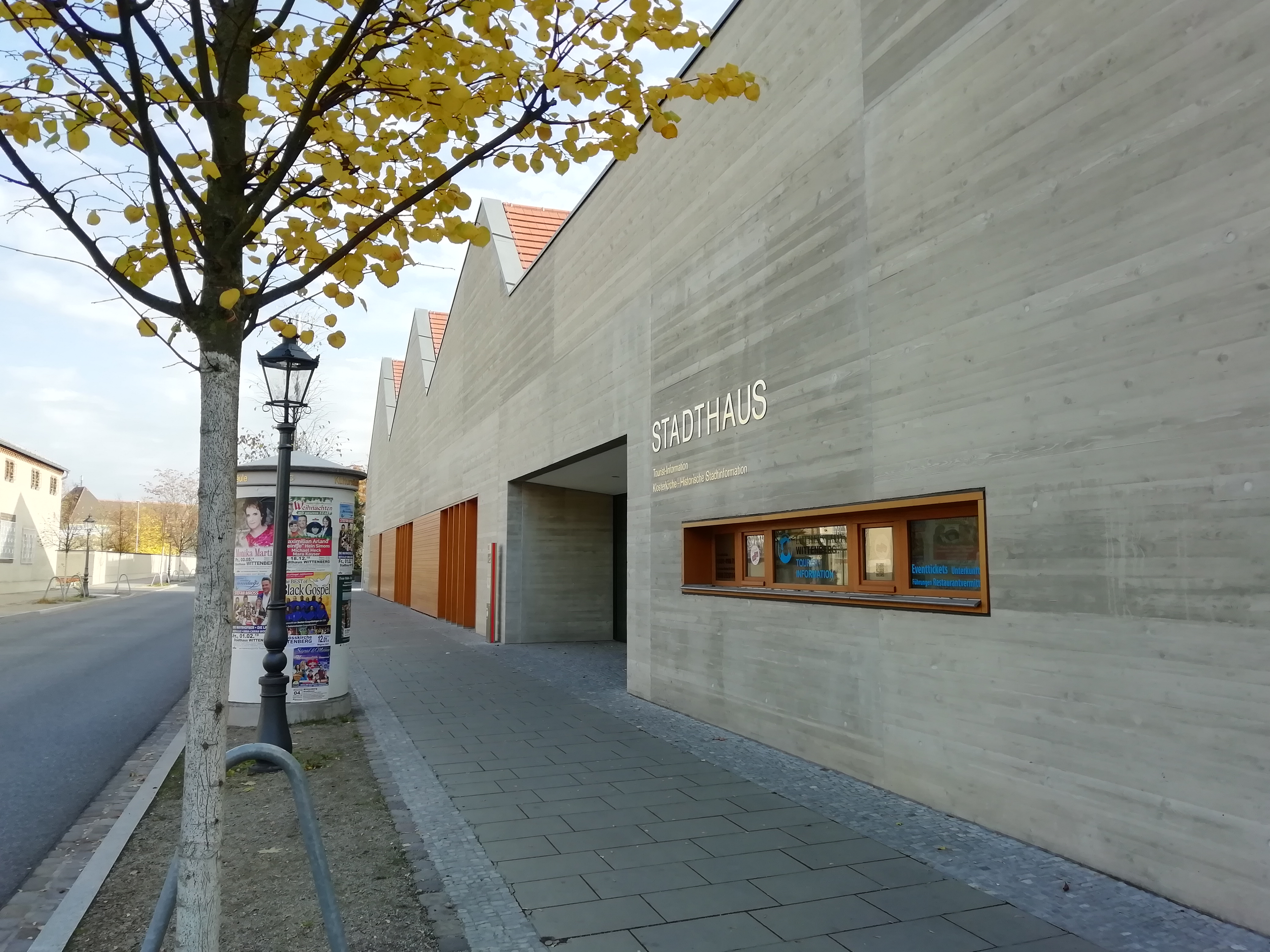
Stadthaus

The Stadthaus is a modern building complex on Arsenalplatz that includes several historic buildings. Their origins date back to the 13th century. The town house contains significant remains of the medieval building fabric of the former monastery church of the Franciscans, which in turn was used as the burial place of the Ascanians. As early as 1536, the building was converted into a granary by Conrad Theiß and heavily remodelled by adding several levels. The medieval windows were closed and pouring openings were installed. During the Seven Years' War, the building was severely damaged and rebuilt with a lower building height. Several building activities in the following period have greatly changed the appearance of the building. At the end of the 19th century, for example, one storey was added and large window openings were broken in on the south side. Between 1945 and 1992, Arsenal Square with the town house was occupied by the Red Army and therefore inaccessible. On the site of the former Franciscan monastery, the city's Central Visitors' Reception was opened in 2014/2015. It includes the event centre Stadthaus, the Historical City Information, the Council Archive and the Tourist and City Information Centre.

===== Altes Rathaus and Marktplatz =====
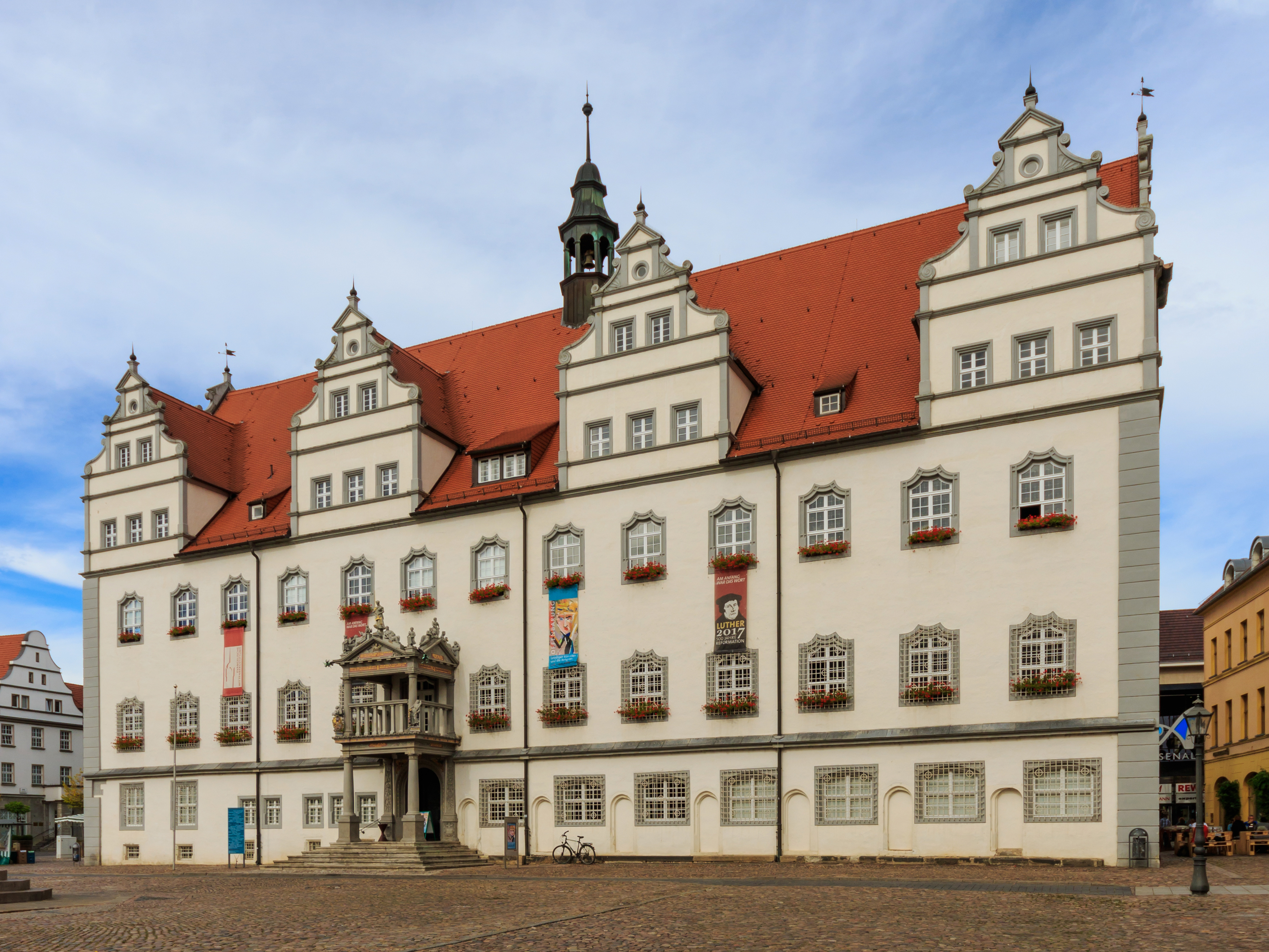
Town hall

In the centre of the old town is the market square, where an ensemble of town houses has grown up over the centuries. On it are the Renaissance town hall, the monuments to Martin Luther (designed by Schadow) and Philipp Melanchthon (by Drake), as well as the Marktbrunnen. Since the town administration has been located in the former Tauentzien barracks in Lutherstraße beginning in 2000 (New Town Hall), the town hall on the market square has been called the Old Town Hall and has since served more representative purposes.

===== Cranach-Höfe =====
The Cranach Courts attest to the work of Lucas Cranach the Elder, Lucas Cranach the Younger, Hans Cranach, Augustin Cranach, and Lucas Cranach III in Wittenberg. The building at Markt 4 and the pharmacy with the courtyard at Schlossstraße 1 show points of contact with Lucas Cranach and his descendants.

Lucas Cranach the Elder set up his own print shop in the once-famous printing town of Wittenberg. Among other things, the 95 Theses, the first part of the Luther Bible, Luther's Table Talks, and numerous woodcuts were printed here. After the reconstruction of the Cranach courtyards, a historic print shop was re-established in Schlossstrasse, where texts (e.g. Luther's table speeches) and illustrations (in linocut) are now produced as privately printed matter using the letterpress process. The historical Gutenberg press in the Cranachhof at Markt 4 demonstrates how printing was done in the Middle Ages.

===== Wittenberg Castle =====
Wittenberg Castle is the former residence of the Saxon Electors. After being destroyed in 1760 and 1814, it was used as a barracks as part of the defensive fortifications. Since the First World War, the castle has served civilian purposes.

=== Museums ===
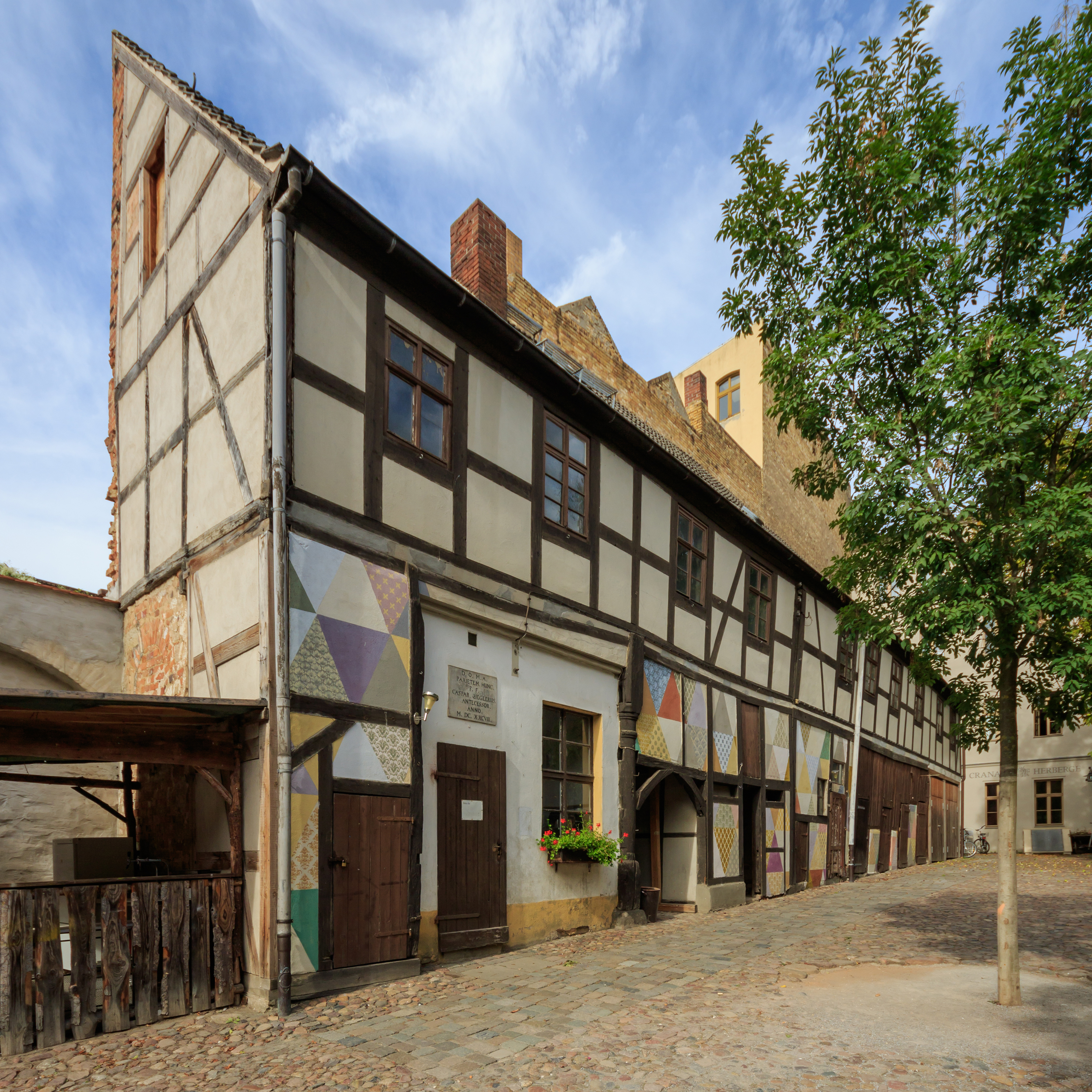
Cranach-Hof

- Cranach-Höfe, Markt 4 (changing exhibitions)
- Altes Rathaus (changing exhibitions)
- Christian Art Foundation Wittenberg with a permanent exhibition and changing special exhibitions in Wittenberg Castle (access via visitor centre)
- Haus der Geschichte (20th century housing culture and in particular that of the former GDR), Schlossstraße 6
- Museum of Municipal Collections in the Zeughaus (city history; Julius Riemer collection: natural history, ethnology), Arsenalplatz
- Science Center futurea, Markt 25
- Historical City Information and burial place of the Ascanians in the monastery church, Arsenalplatz

=== Other sights ===
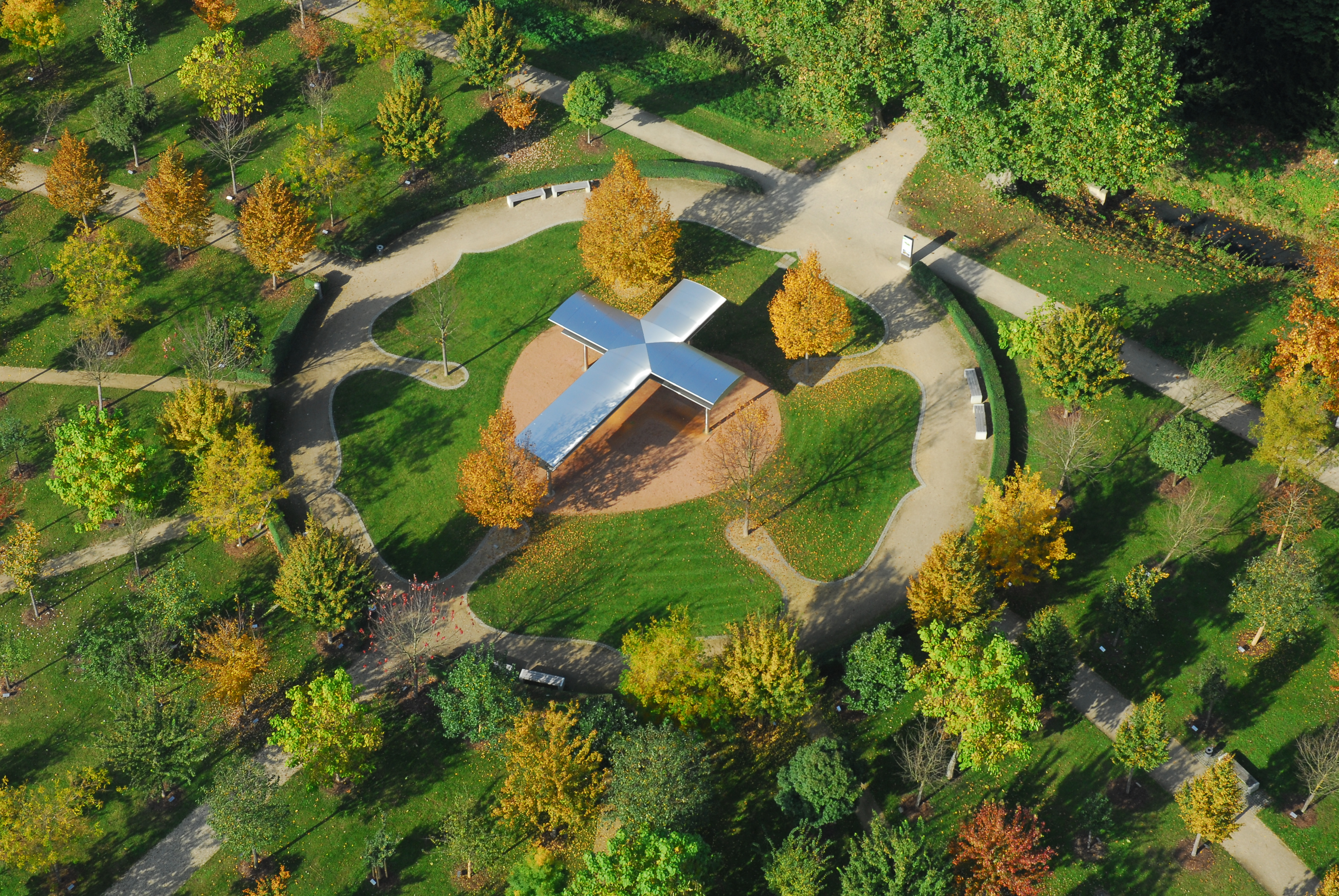
Luthergarten

- Luthereiche at the southern end of Lutherstraße, where Martin Luther burned the Bull of Banishment of the Pope in 1520, thus completing his separation from the Roman Catholic Church.
- Röhrwasser, historical water supply system. In the 16th century, the steady growth of the population of the town of Wittenberg made a supply of fresh and clear water increasingly necessary. The existing wells and streams were no longer sufficient, as they were increasingly polluted with rubbish. The tubewater changed all that. With the tube water connection, fresh spring water was available to the citizens day and night, summer and winter. It was not until 1883 that the tubewater lost its importance due to the central water supply. Today, the Wittenberg tube water system with its 20 or so existing wells is the only functioning tube water supply system from the Middle Ages north of the Alps and thus a technical monument. Since 2002, parts of the streams flowing through the town have been opened up.
- Ratsarchiv Wittenberg, Juristentrasse 16.
- Kirchliches Forschungsheim, Friedrichstrasse 1a.
- Luthergarten, park with 270 trees from all over the world near the castle on Kurfürstenring (formerly Hallesche Straße).
- Panoramic circular image Luther 1517 by Yadegar Asisi, Wilhelm-Weber-Straße near the Lutherhaus
- Tierpark Wittenberg (Zoological Garden), Juristenstraße.
- Alaris Butterfly Park, Rothemarkstraße.
- K-Building (Kommandantengebäude), to house the planned study collection of the municipal collections, with attached lecture and conference centre, Juristenstrasse 14

== Coat of arms ==
Wittenberg's civic coat of arms conveys with its various heraldic elements something of the town's history. On 27 June 1293, Wittenberg was granted town rights by Duke Albert II. There then arose a mediaeval town whose highest governing body was its council. This council, known to have existed as early as 1317, was given the job of administering the town in its care through law and legislation, and of handling the town's revenue. For documentation, the administration used its own seal. One version of what is believed to be the town's oldest town seal, which the council used, and which dated from the first half of the 14th century, set the pattern with its elements for various civic coats of arms down to the present day.

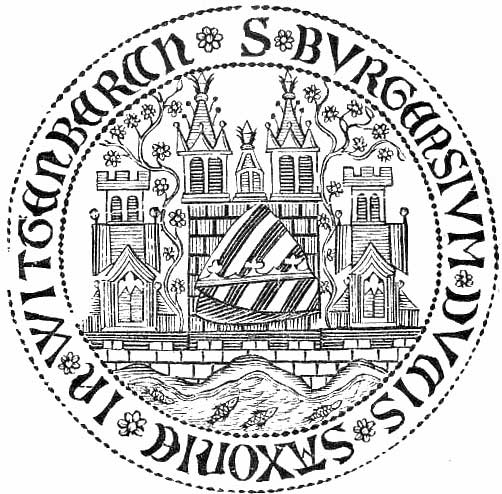
Wittenberg's oldest coat of arms

The coat of arms symbolizes, with its crenelated wall and the towers within and each side, a town that was already strongly fortified by 1409. The two shields in the centre form the coat of arms of the Electorate of Saxony with the Saxon arms on the right, whose gold and black stripes recall the Ascanian rulers' house colours with the Rautenkranz or crancelin (literally "rue wreath"; see the Saxony article for more) across them symbolizing the town's founder Duke Albrecht II since 1262, when it appeared in his arms. The shield on the left is the Wittenberg district's arms. In 1356, Emperor Charles IV bestowed upon the Duke of Saxony-Wittenberg the honour of Elector. Wittenberg became an Electoral residence. The shield with its crossed swords stands for the office of "Arch-Marshal of the Holy Roman Empire" inextricably joined by the Electorate, brought to Wittenberg by Rudolf I. Both coats of arms continued to be used by the Wettins after the Ascanians died out. The flowing water at the foot of the shield symbolizes Wittenberg's location on the River Elbe. The fish is a salmon, which as once abundant in the Elbe. The fishermen, like all professions in town, got their own order in 1422, and the fish found its way onto their coat of arms.

== Economy and infrastructure ==
The town is a centre of the chemical industry with the SKW Stickstoffwerke Piesteritz GmbH. The whole area of the industrial park covers more than 220 hectares with more than 1,500 workers. Tourism plays a major role. Wittenberg is one of the top destinations in Saxony-Anhalt.

Lutherstadt Wittenberg station is the main railway station. It connects Wittenberg hourly with Berlin to the north and Leipzig and Halle (Saale) to the south. The station was rebuilt to be more environmentally friendly and re-opened in December 2016.

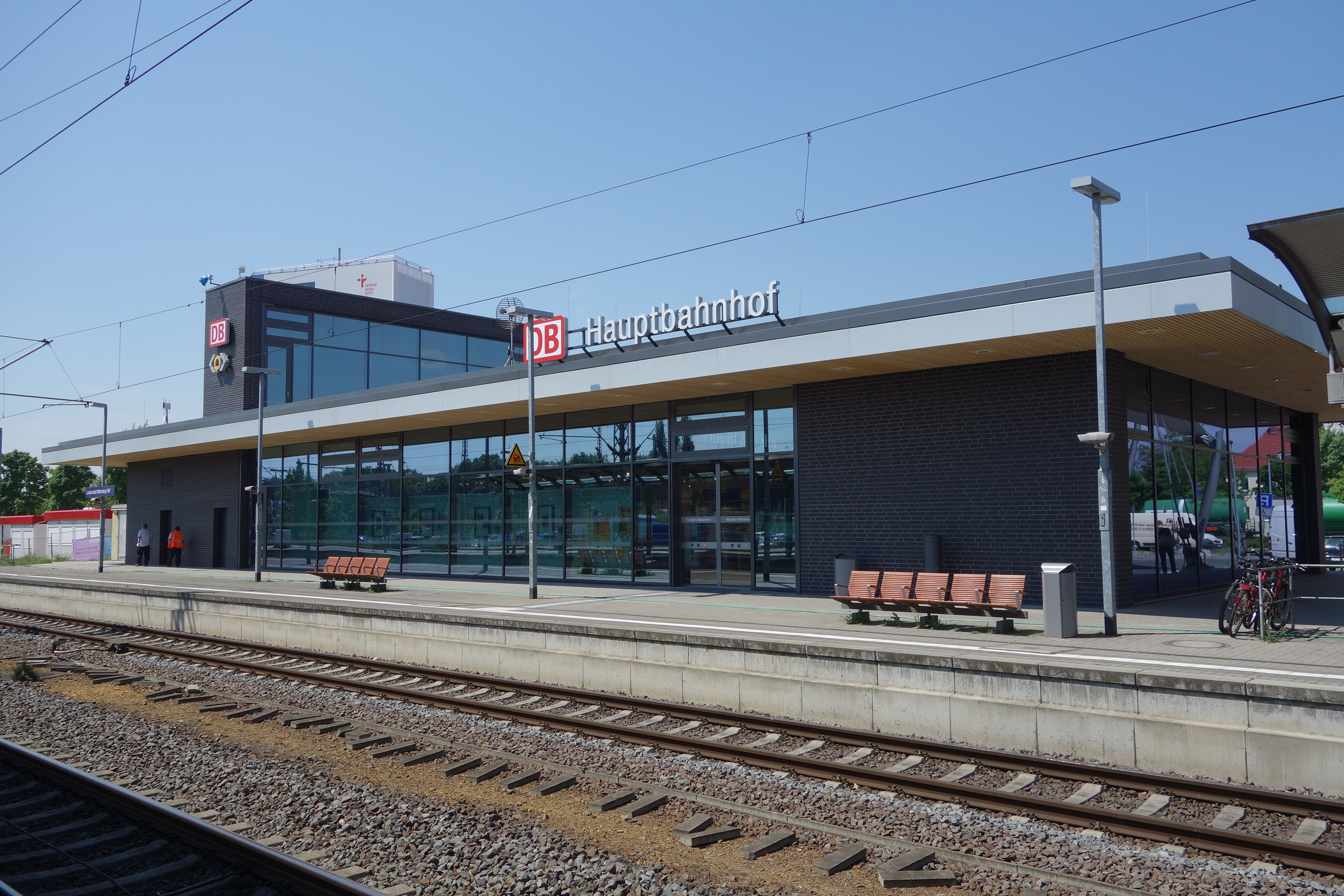
The new Lutherstadt Wittenberg station in 2017

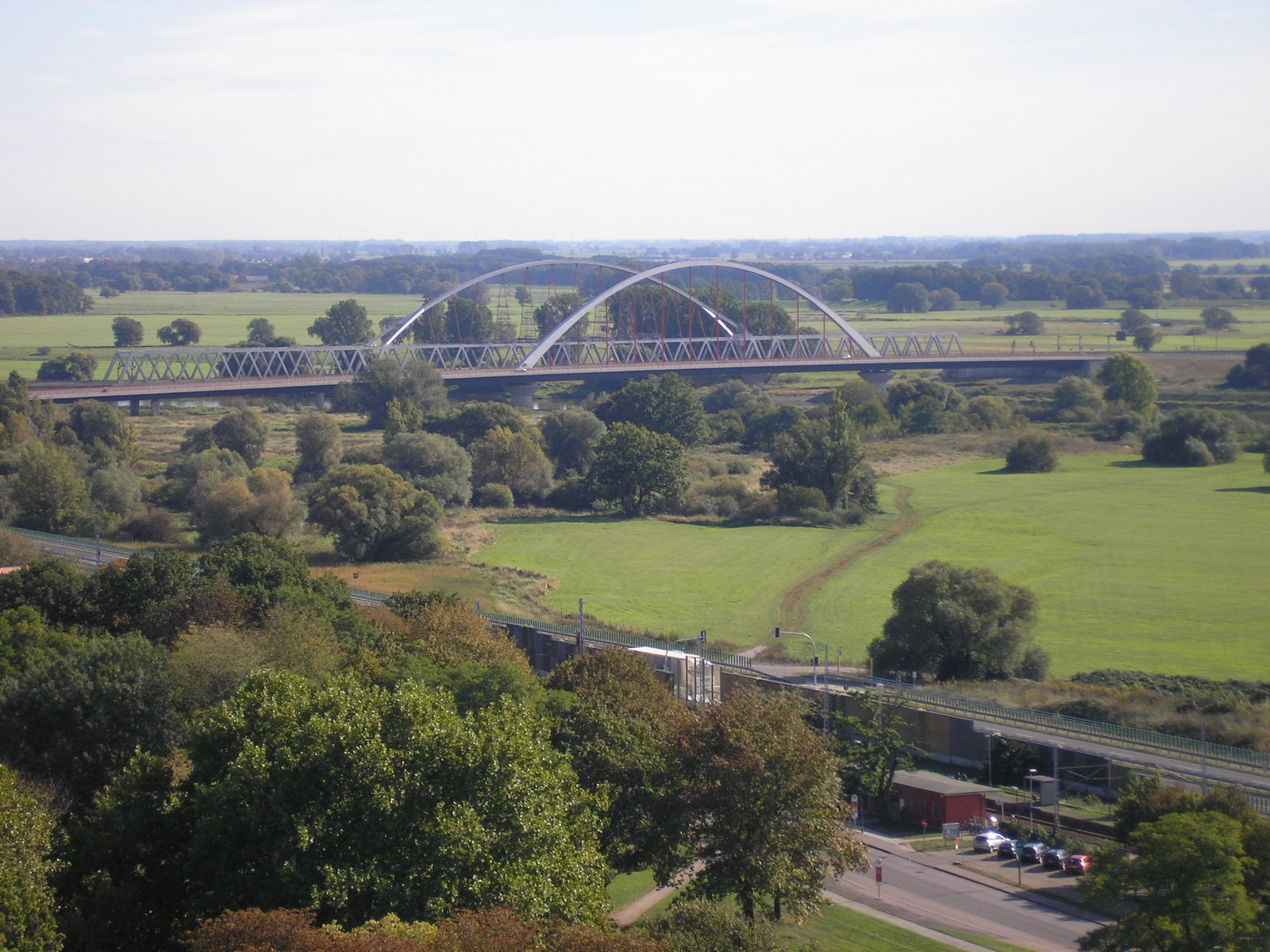
The Elbe bridge is part of the Bundesstraße 2 federal highway

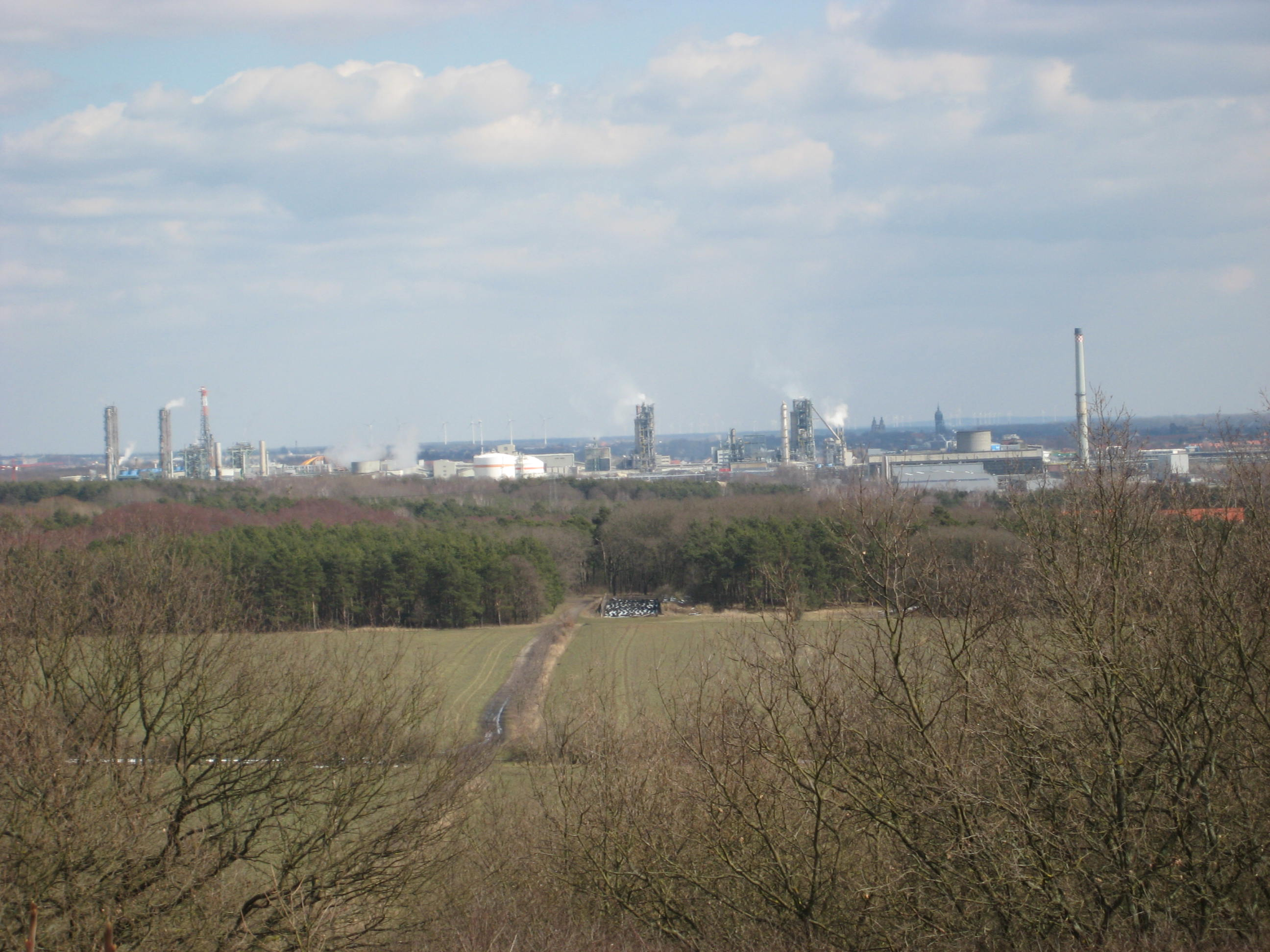
The 'SKW Piesteritz' industrial area

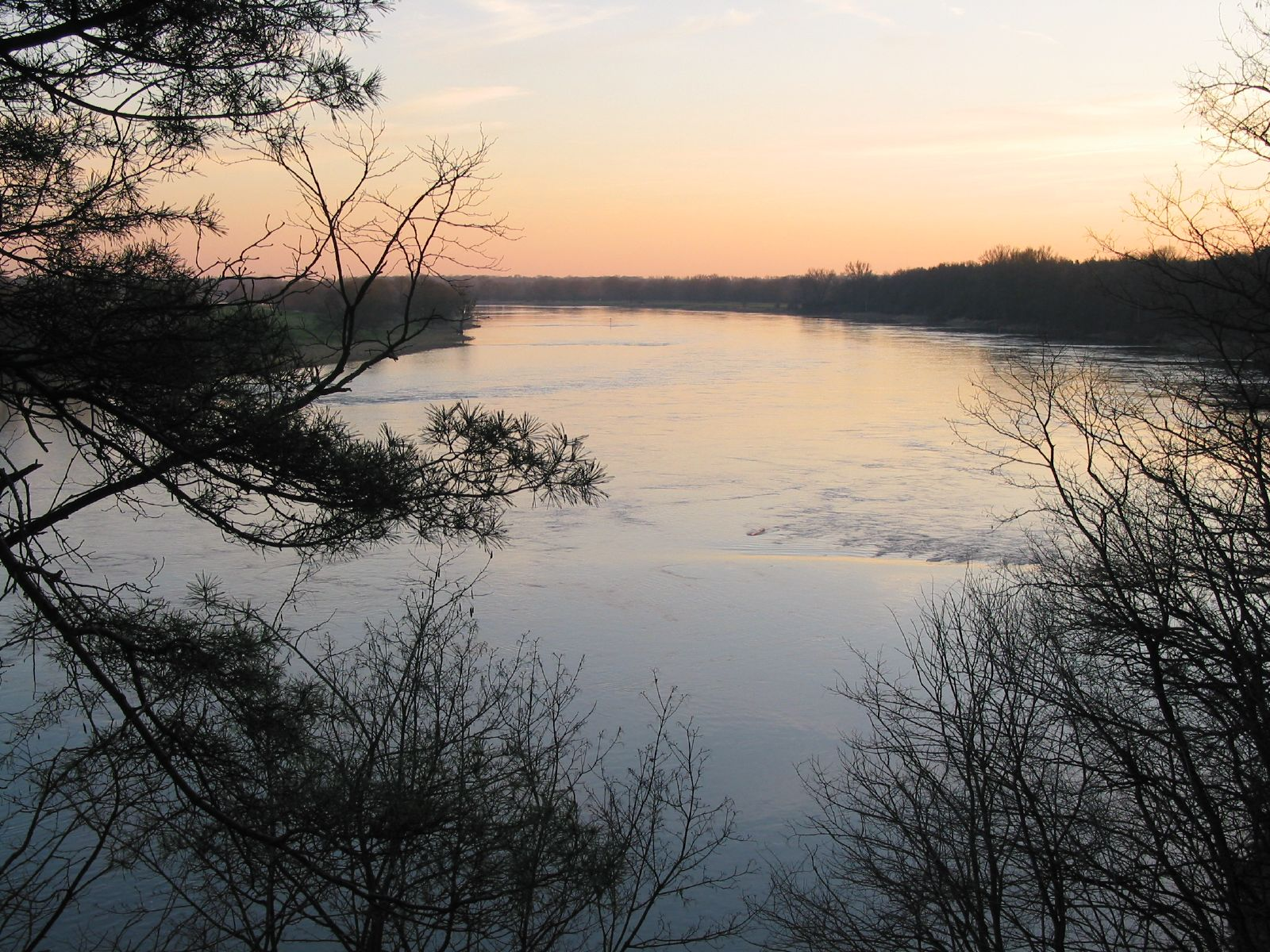
The Elbe connects Wittenberg with Hamburg and Magdeburg

== Theatre, culture and education ==
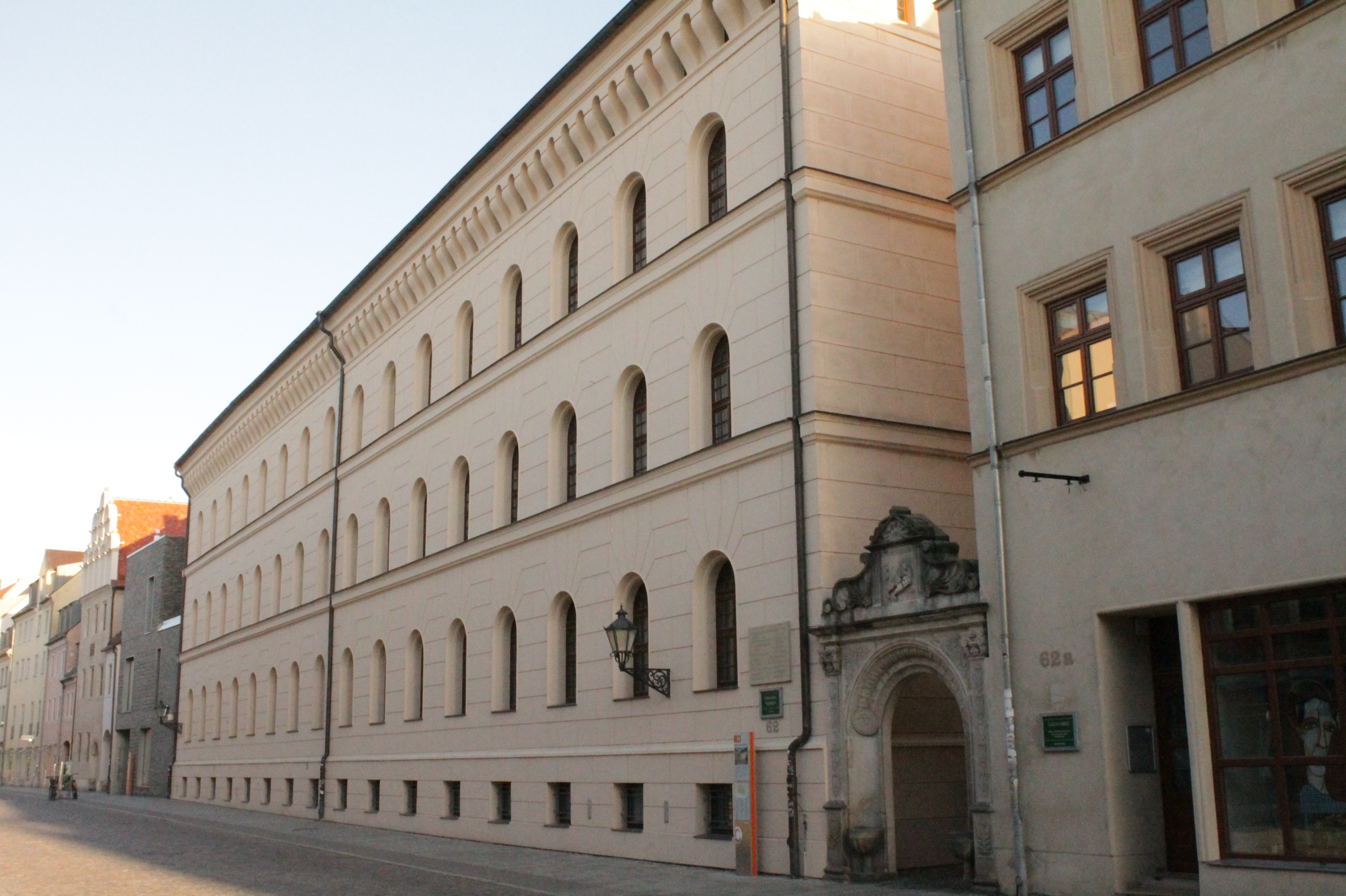
Leucorea

Wittenberg has a long tradition of cultural events. The Central German State Theatre (Mitteldeutsches Landestheater) reached great importance in GDR times. Since 1996, the town has staged open-air theatre shows based on the Lutheran history still alive in many historical places of the ancient town. As highlights, in 2001 and 2005, Fernando Scarpa became the artistic director of the "Bühne Wittenberg" (Stage Wittenberg), a project for theatre, art and culture in the whole of Germany which attracts many visitors to the town and whose success is known European-wide. On 2002 and 2003 Stefano Vagnini, Italian composer and organist created the music for Thesys and Luther Stories.

Wittenberg is the seat of the Leucorea which is part of the Martin Luther University of Halle-Wittenberg, the largest university in Saxony-Anhalt. It is also home to the Gymnasium Leucorea, the largest college-preparatory secondary school in the state. The Gymnasium's Hundertwasser site is the only school building designed by Viennese architect Friedensreich Hundertwasser.

== Representation in art and literature ==
Wittenberg appears in early modern literature as a university town associated with both Reformation theology and illicit learning. The anonymous chapbook Historia von D. Johann Fausten (1587) makes the town Faust’s place of study and the nearby woods the site of his pact with the devil; the English translation of 1592, The Historie of the damnable life and deserved death of Doctor John Faustus, carried that setting into English. Christopher Marlowe’s tragedy Doctor Faustus (c. 1592) likewise places the scholar at the University of Wittenberg. William Shakespeare’s Hamlet does not take place in the town, but the prince and Horatio are said to have studied there, a detail often read as linking Elsinore to Wittenberg’s reputation for new learning.

Later drama returns to the city as a stage. John Osborne’s play Luther (1961) includes scenes in the Wittenberg cloister and on the steps of the Castle Church on the eve of the posting of the Ninety-five Theses. David Davalos’s comedy Wittenberg (premiered 2008) is set at the university in 1517 and puts Hamlet, Martin Luther, and John Faustus on the same campus.

On film, Wittenberg is a principal narrative location in biographies of Luther, notably Irving Pichel’s Martin Luther (1953) and Eric Till’s Luther (2003), although the 2003 production used other German and Czech towns as stand-ins for the sixteenth-century city.

In the visual arts the town is both subject and workshop. Lucas Cranach the Elder and Lucas Cranach the Younger worked in Wittenberg as court painters; their portraits of Luther and Melanchthon and the 1547 Wittenberg Altarpiece in the Town Church were made for local churches and patrons. Nineteenth-century history paintings including Eyre Crowe’s Wittenberg, October 31, 1517 (1864) depict the famous nailing of Luther's theses to the church door. In the city itself, Yadegar Asisi’s 360-degree panorama Luther 1517 reconstructs Wittenberg as it was at the beginning of the Reformation.

== Personalities from the 19th to the 21st century ==
Not only the men of the Reformation era Martin Luther, Philipp Melanchthon and Lucas Cranach left their mark on Wittenberg. Much more than in its role as the capital of Kursachsen and as the residential town of Saxony-Wittenberg, the city was shaped by the university. The names and dates of many personalities are recorded on memorial plaques on the houses in the old town.

=== 1801–1850 ===
- Johann Friedrich von Brandt (* 1802 in Jüterbog; † 1879 in Merreküll), medical doctor and naturalist
- Friedrich Drake (* 1805 in Pyrmont; † 1882 in Berlin), sculptor
- Friedrich Wilhelm Ritschl (* 1806 in Großvargula; † 1876 in Leipzig), philologist
- Johann Hinrich Wichern (* 1808 in Hamburg; † 1881 in Hamburg), theologian
- Johann Gottfried Galle (* 1812 in Pabsthaus; † 1910 in Potsdam), astronomer
- Werner von Siemens (* 1816 in Lenthe; † 1892 Berlin), industrialist, founder of electrical engineering
- Karl Wilhelm Nitzsch (* 1818 in Zerbst; † 1880 in Berlin), historian
- Adalbert Falk (* 1827 in Metschkau; † 1900 in Hamm), Prussian minister of culture, honorary citizen of Wittenberg

=== 1851–1900 ===
- Karl Lamprecht (* 1856 in Jessen; † 1915 in Leipzig), historian
- Nathan Söderblom (* 1866 in Trönö; † 1931 in Uppsala), theologian, Nobel Peace Prize laureate, honorary citizen of Wittenberg
- Otto Kleinschmidt (* 1870 in Geinsheim 1870; † 1954 in Wittenberg), natural scientist.
- Otto Dibelius (* 1880 in Berlin; † 1967 in West Berlin), theologian
- Julius Riemer (* 1880 in Berlin; 1958 in Wittenberg), museum founder
- Else Hertzer (*1884 in Wittenberg; † 1978 in West Berlin), expressionist painter
- Otto Rasch (* 1891 in Friedrichsruh; † 1948 in Nuremberg), Lord Mayor 1934–36, as commander of Einsatzgruppe C responsible, among other things, for the massacre of Babyn Yar
- Hermann Oberth (* 1894 in Hermannstadt; † 1989 in Nuremberg), nuclear physicist

=== 1901–1945 ===
- Erwin Wickert (* 1915 in Bralitz; † 2008 in Remagen), diplomat and writer
- Konrad Wolf (* 1925 in Hechingen; † 1982 in Berlin), director
- Ezard Haußmann (* 1935 in Potsdam; † 2010 in Potsdam), actor
- Wolfgang Böhmer (* 1936 in Dürrhennersdorf), medical doctor, former Minister President of Saxony-Anhalt
- Friedrich Schorlemmer (* 1944 in Wittenberge), theologian

=== After 1945 ===
- Reiner Haseloff (* 1954 in Bülzig), politician (CDU), Minister-President of Saxony-Anhalt since 2011
- Frank Wartenberg (* 1955 in Prenzlau), track and field athlete
- Christiane Wartenberg (* 1956 in Prenzlau), track and field athlete
- Mathias Tietke (* 1959 in Wittenberg), right‑wing extremist, yoga teacher and non‑fiction author
- Peter Fitzek (* 1965 in Halle an der Saale), activist of the Reich citizenship movement, founder of the fantasy state Kingdom of Germany
- Fernando Scarpa (* 1968 in Milan), Italian film director
- Nils Seethaler (* 1981 in Berlin), provenance researcher and museum initiator

== Twin towns – sister cities ==
Wittenberg is twinned with:

- Göttingen, Germany (1988)
- Bretten, Germany (1990)
- Springfield, Ohio, United States (1995)
- Békéscsaba, Hungary (1999)
- Haderslev, Denmark (2004)
- Beveren, Belgium (2019)
- Mediaș, Romania (2019)
- Mogilev, Belarus (2019)

== Gallery ==
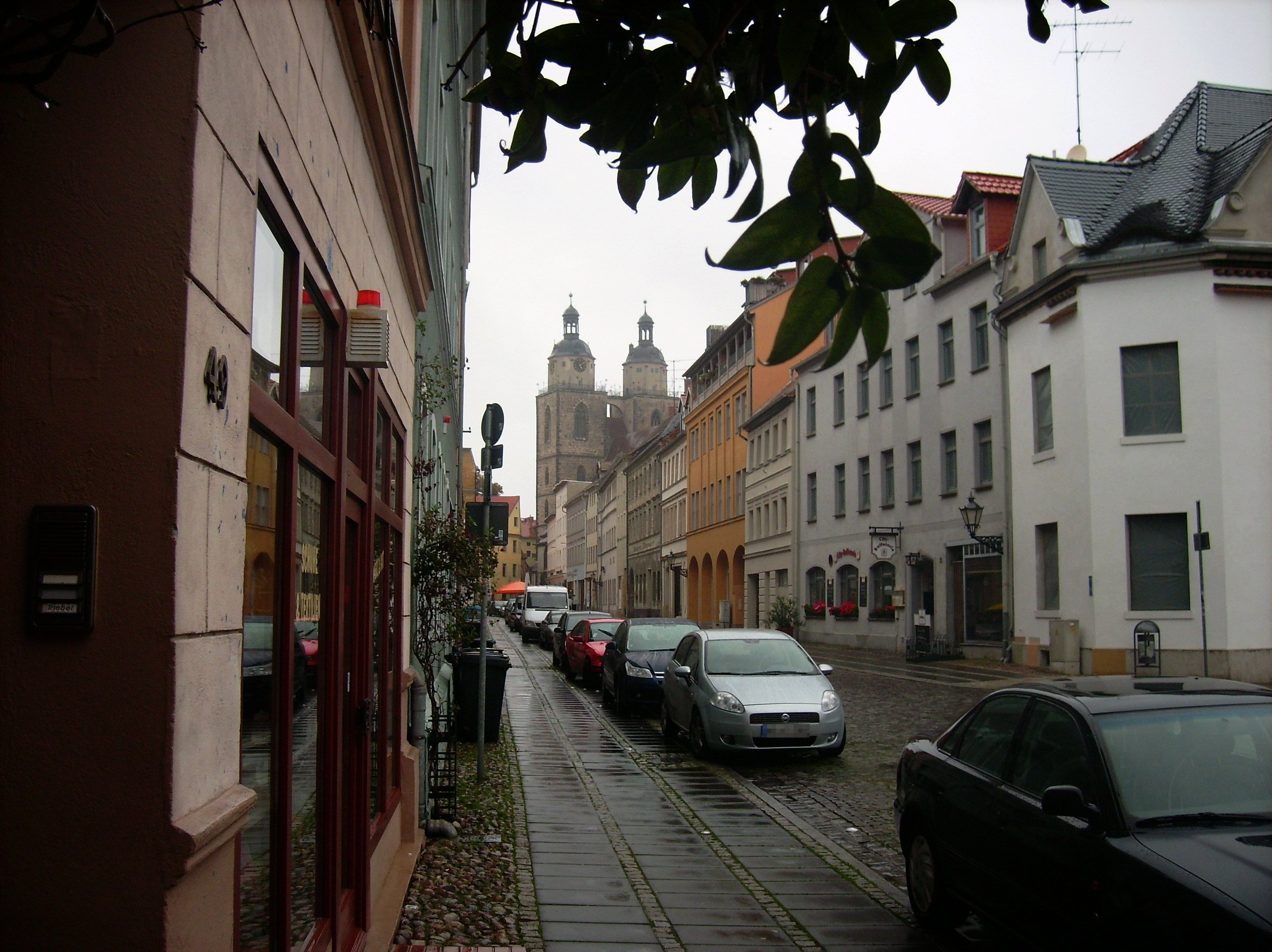
Wittenberg old town

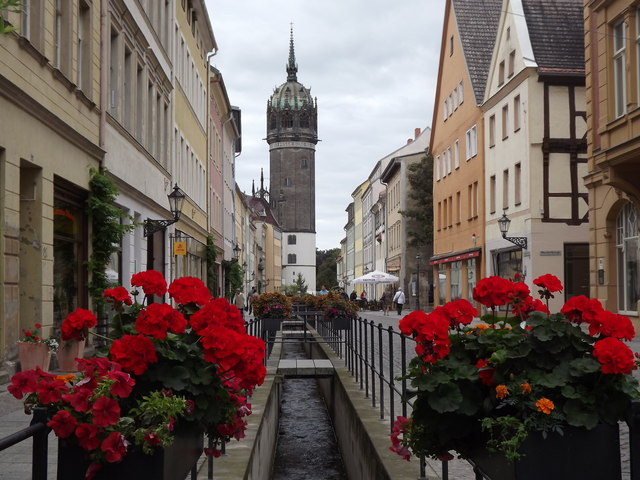
View to All Saints' Church

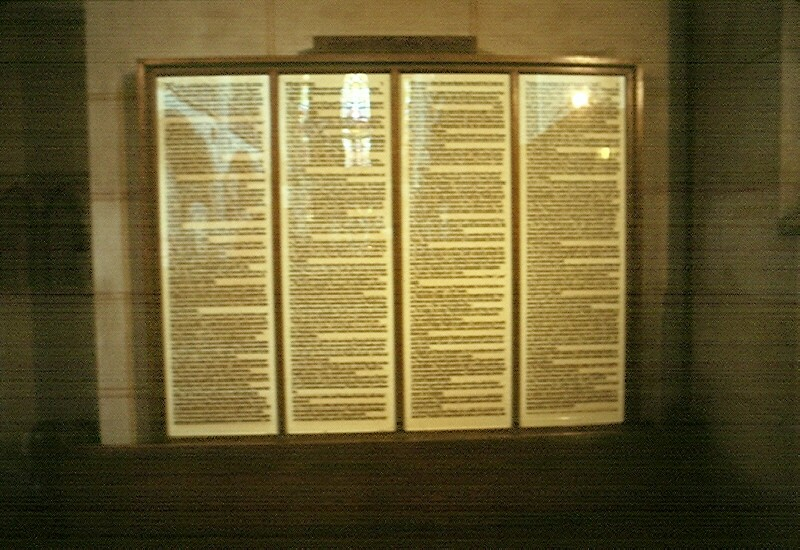
Replica of the Ninety-five Theses in the All Saints' Church

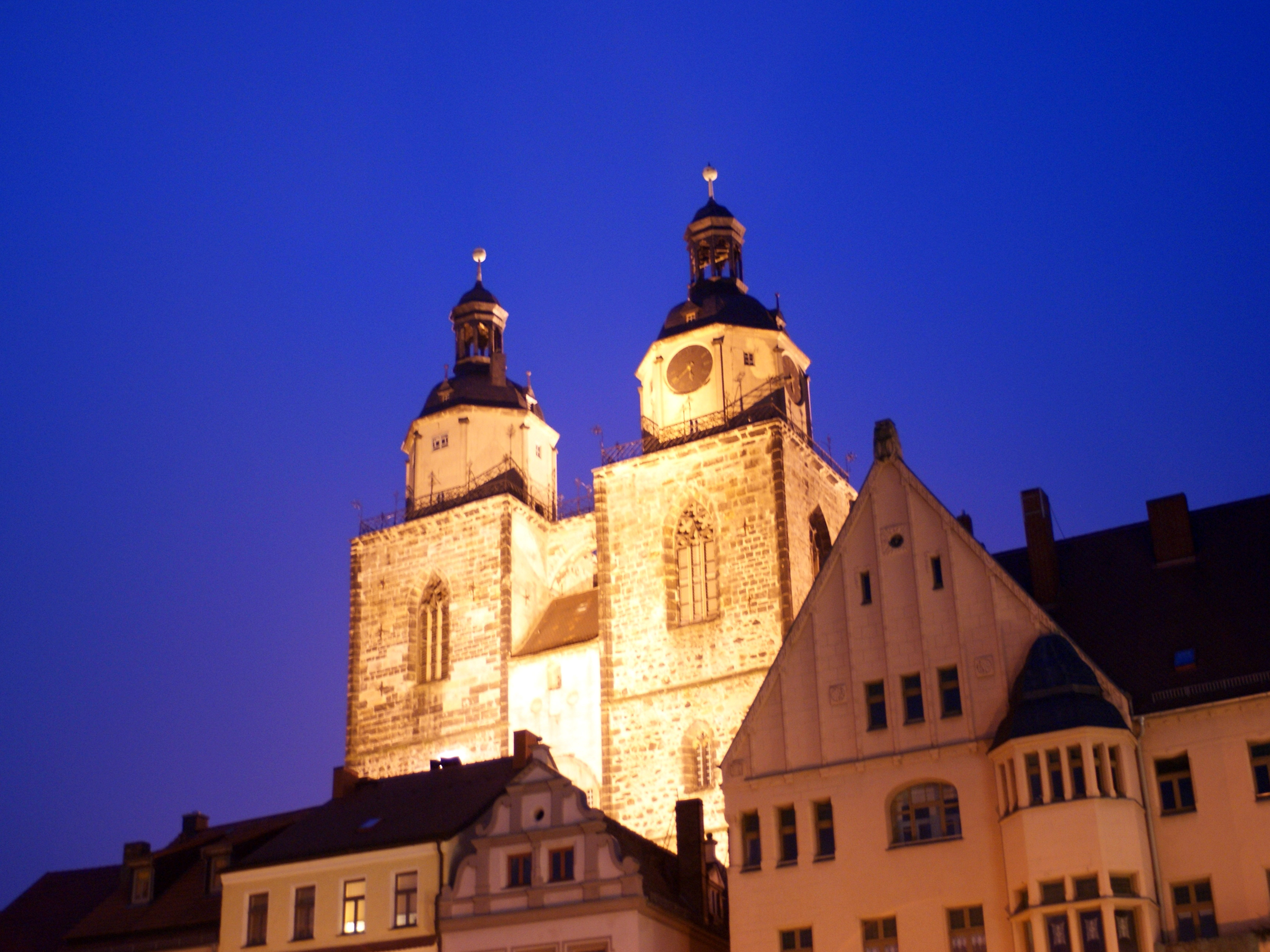
Stadtkirche

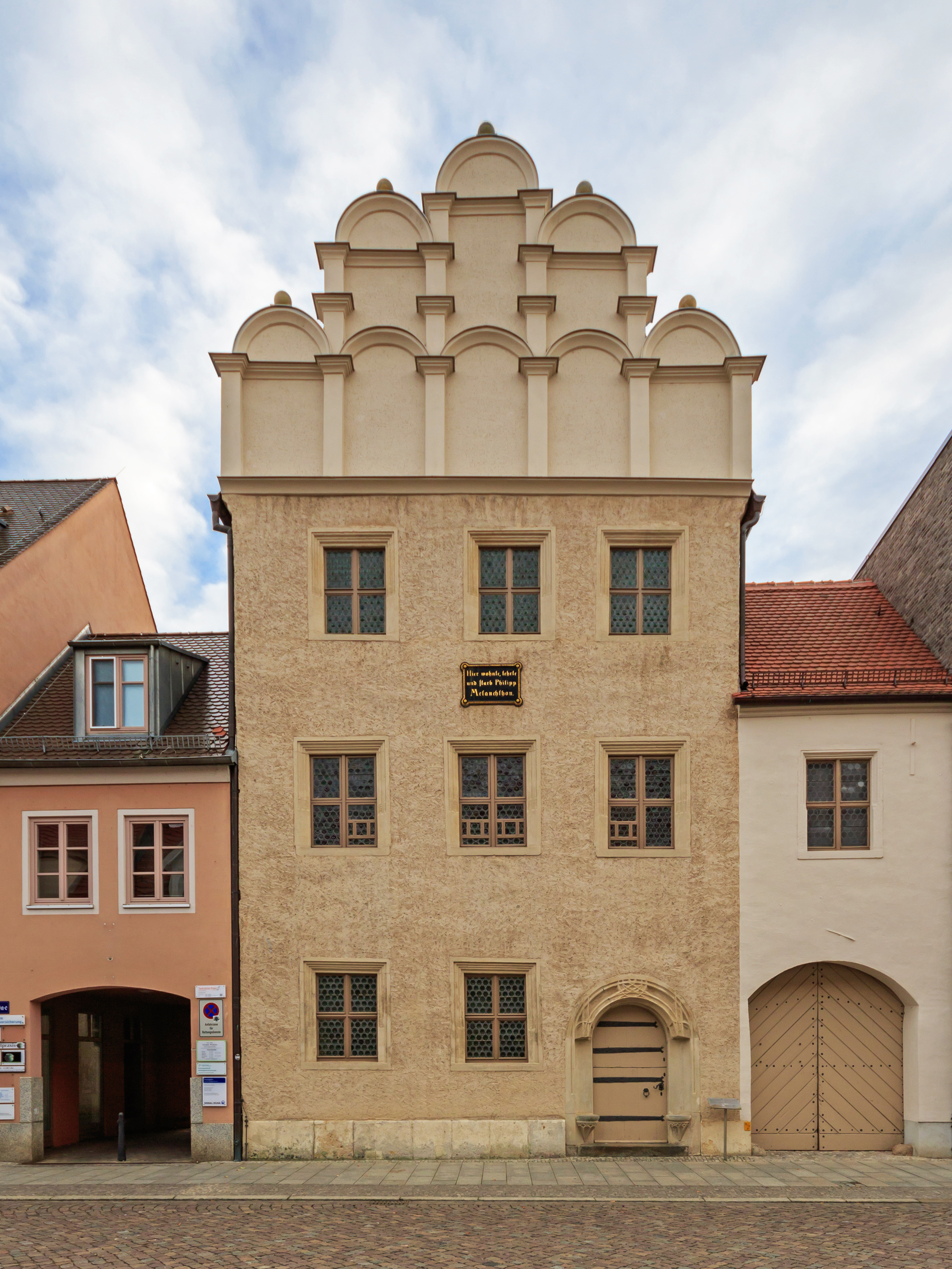
Melanchthonhaus (Wittenberg)

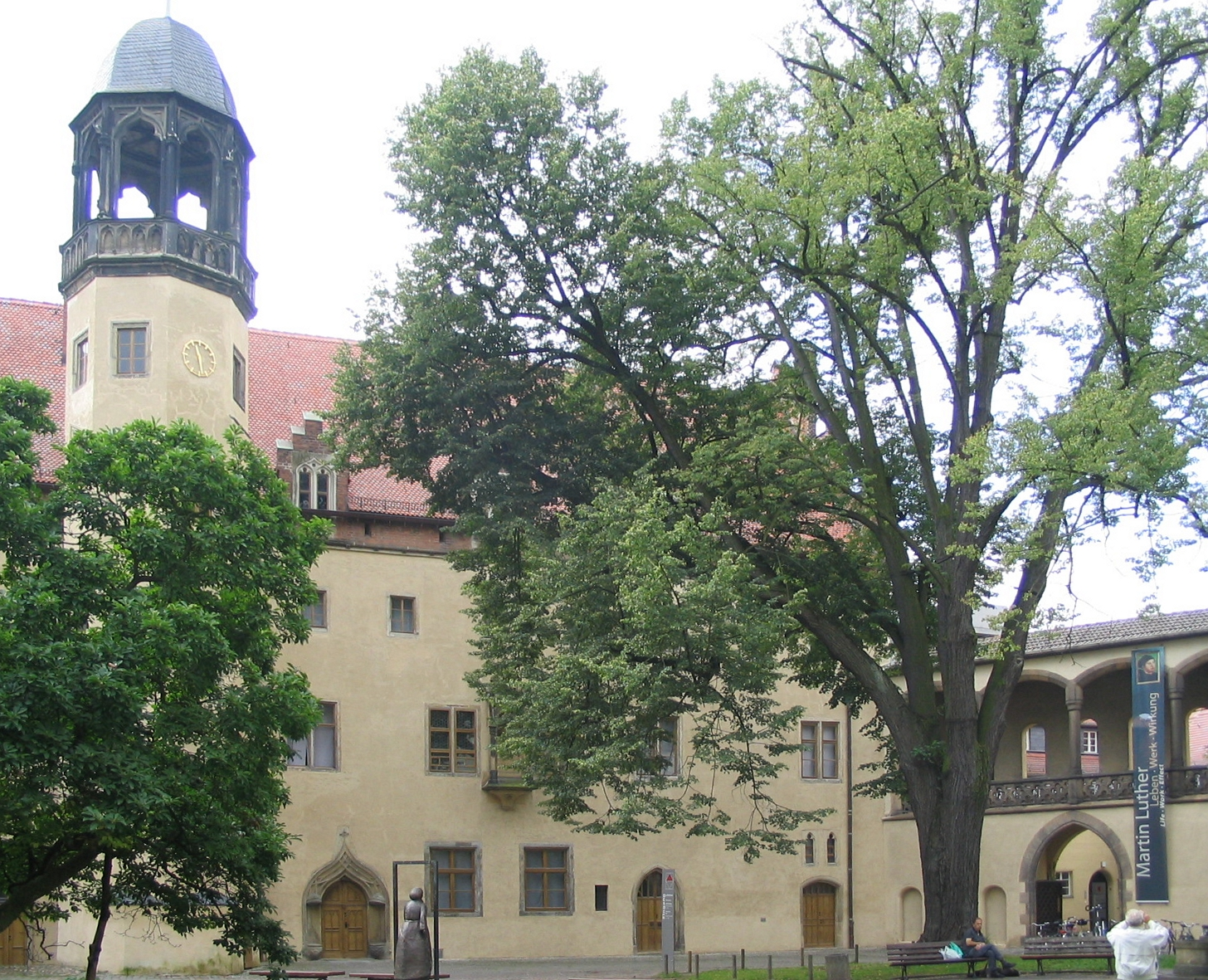
The Augusteum and Lutherhaus

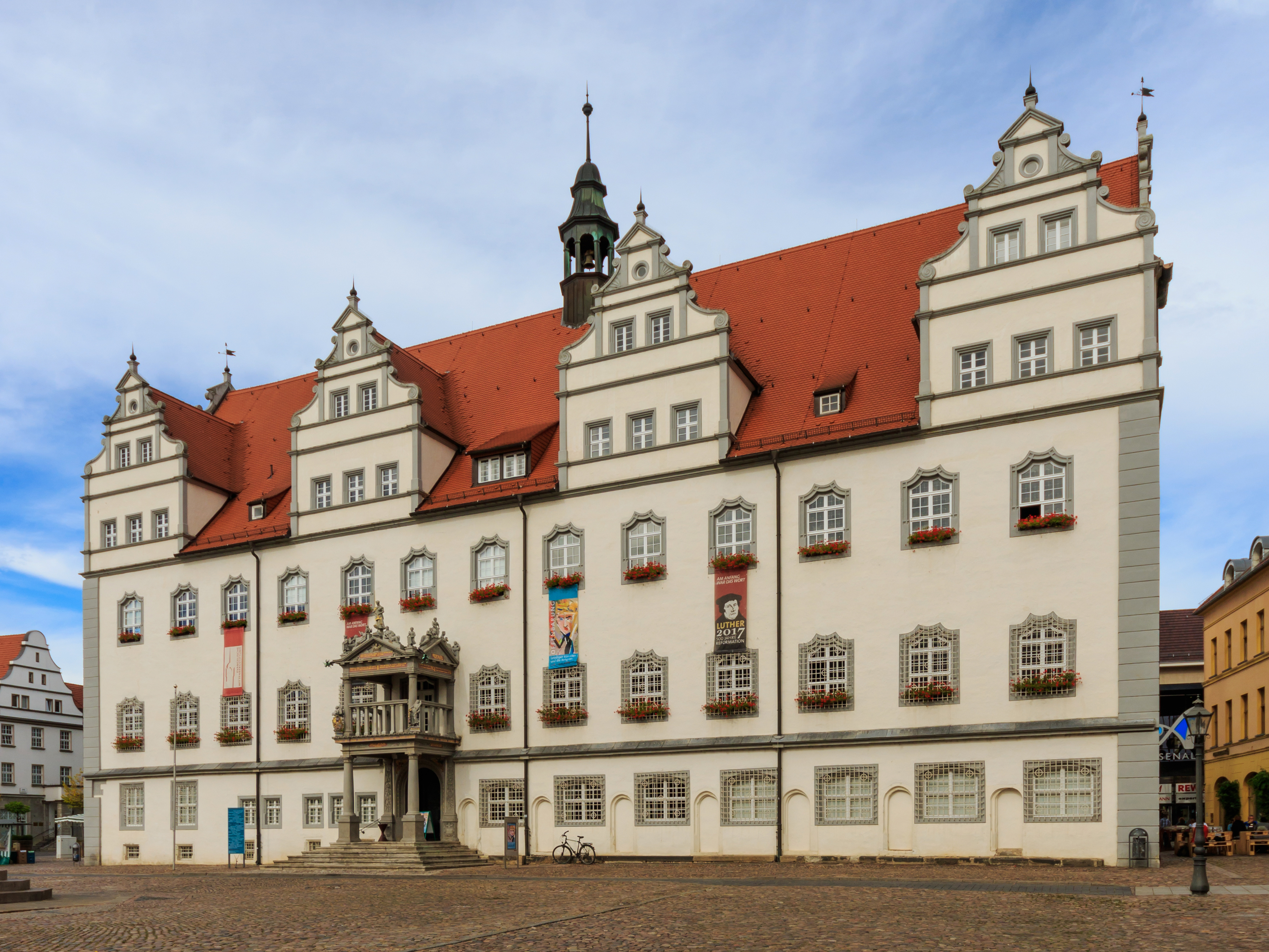
Town hall

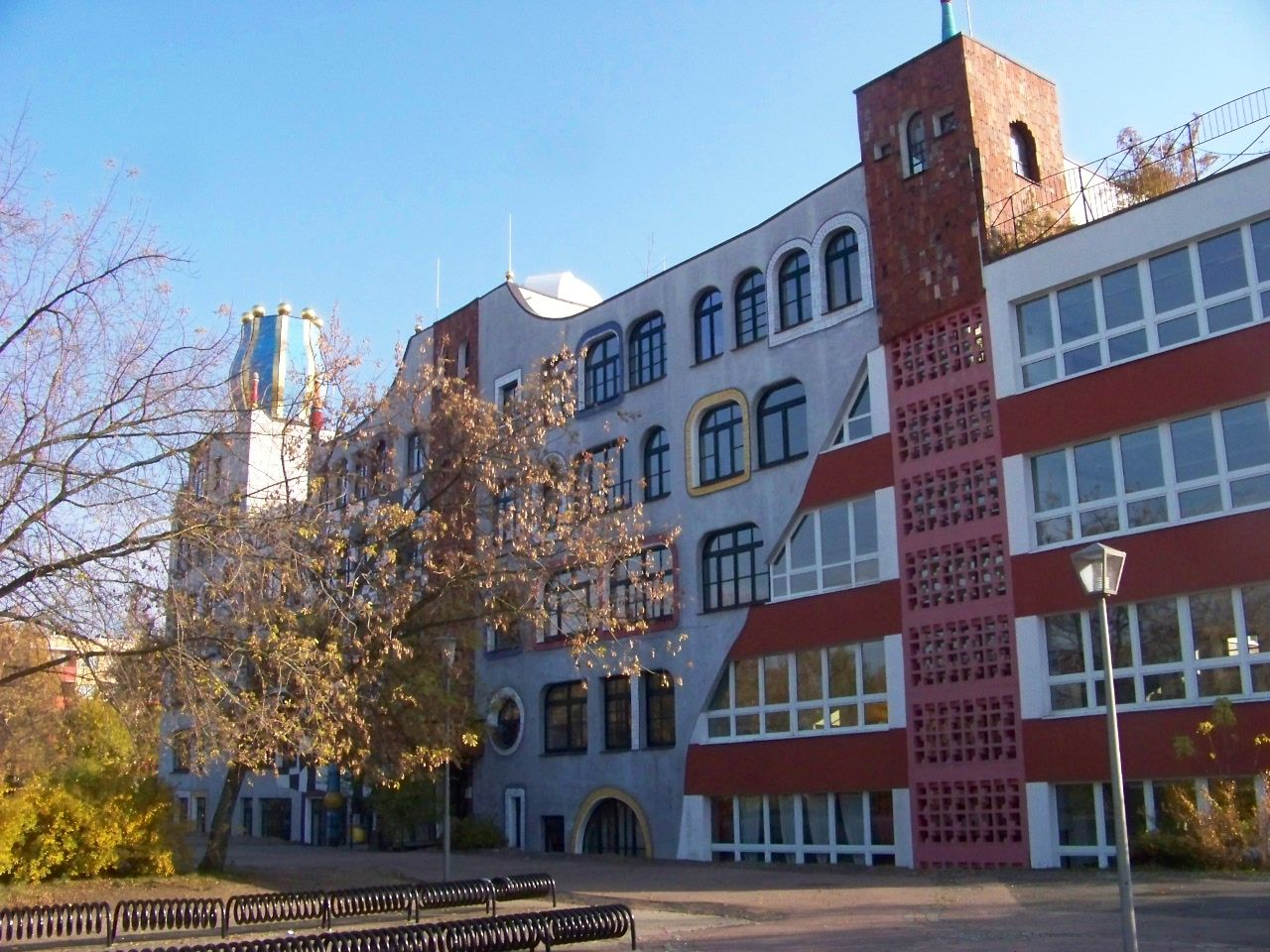
Hundertwasserschule, School by Friedensreich Hundertwasser

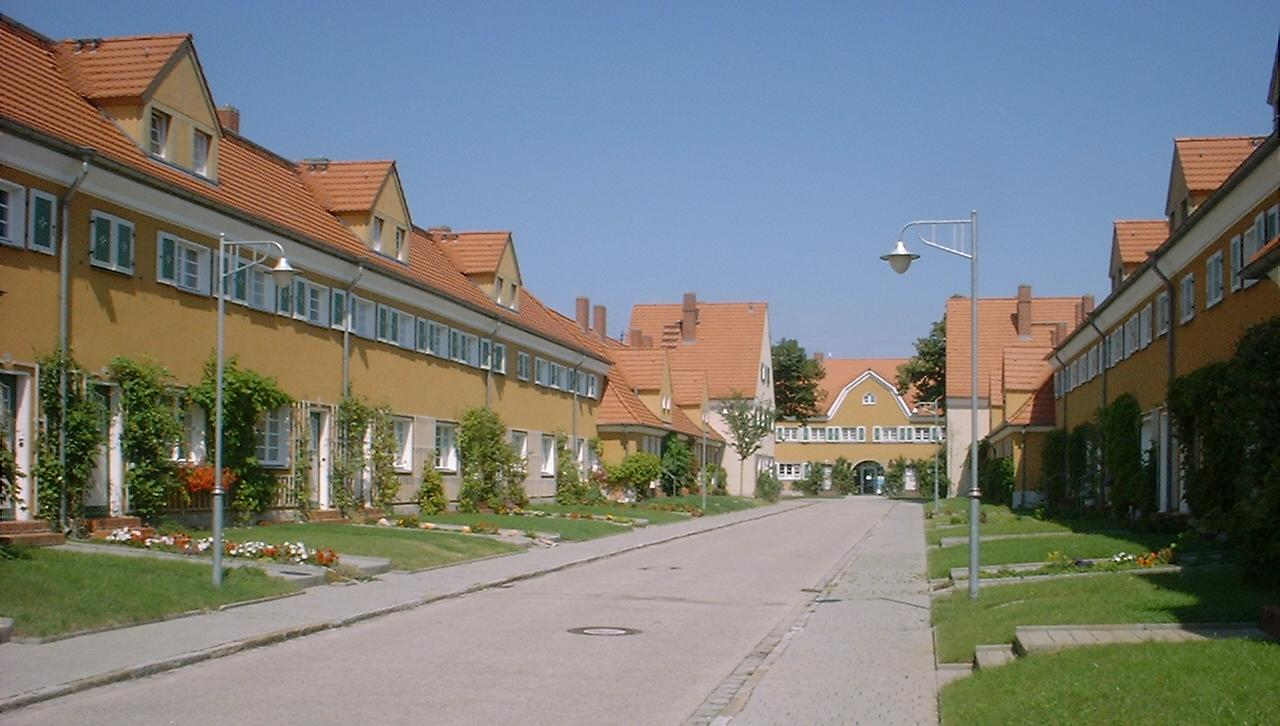
Werksiedlung Wittenberg

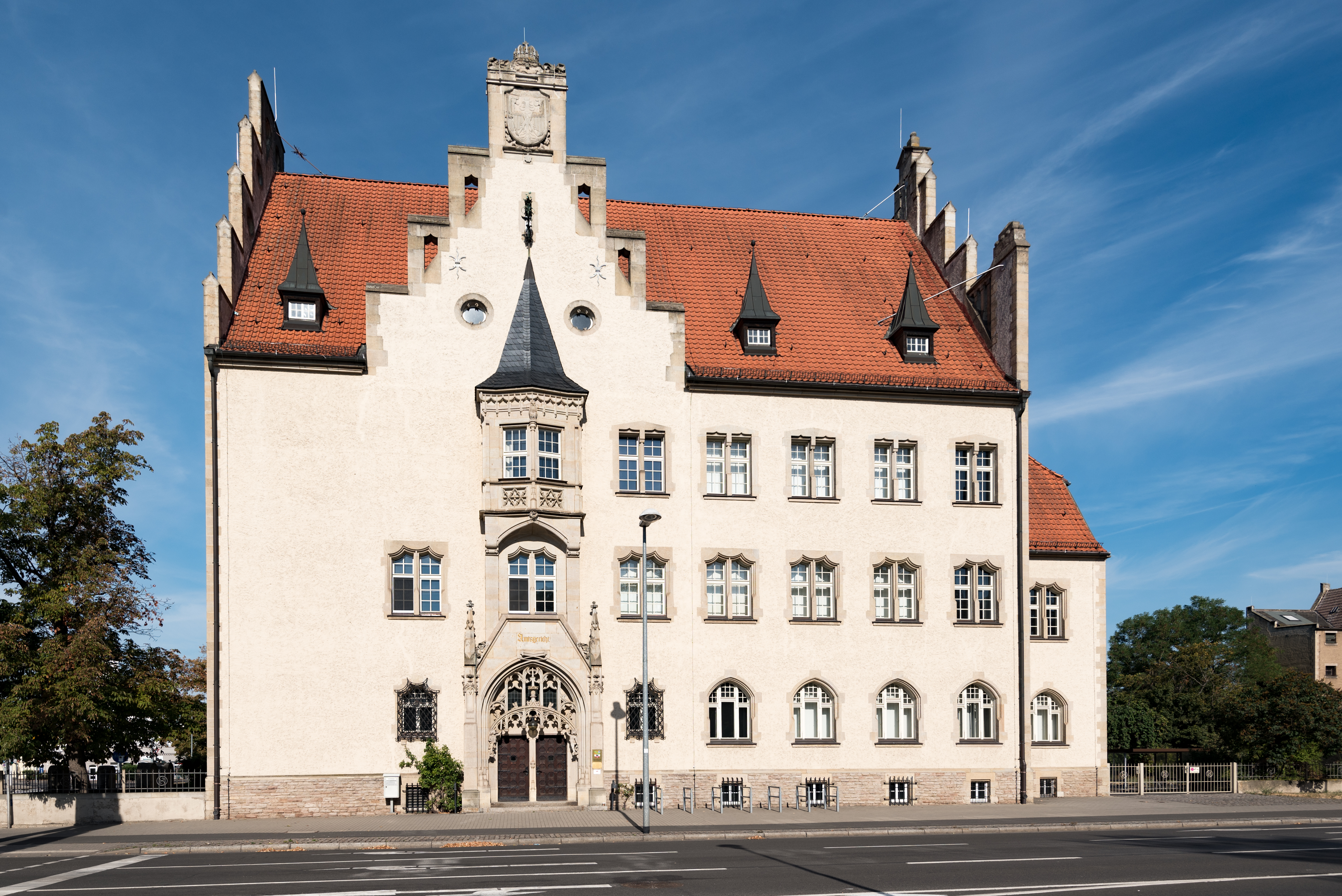
Amtsgericht

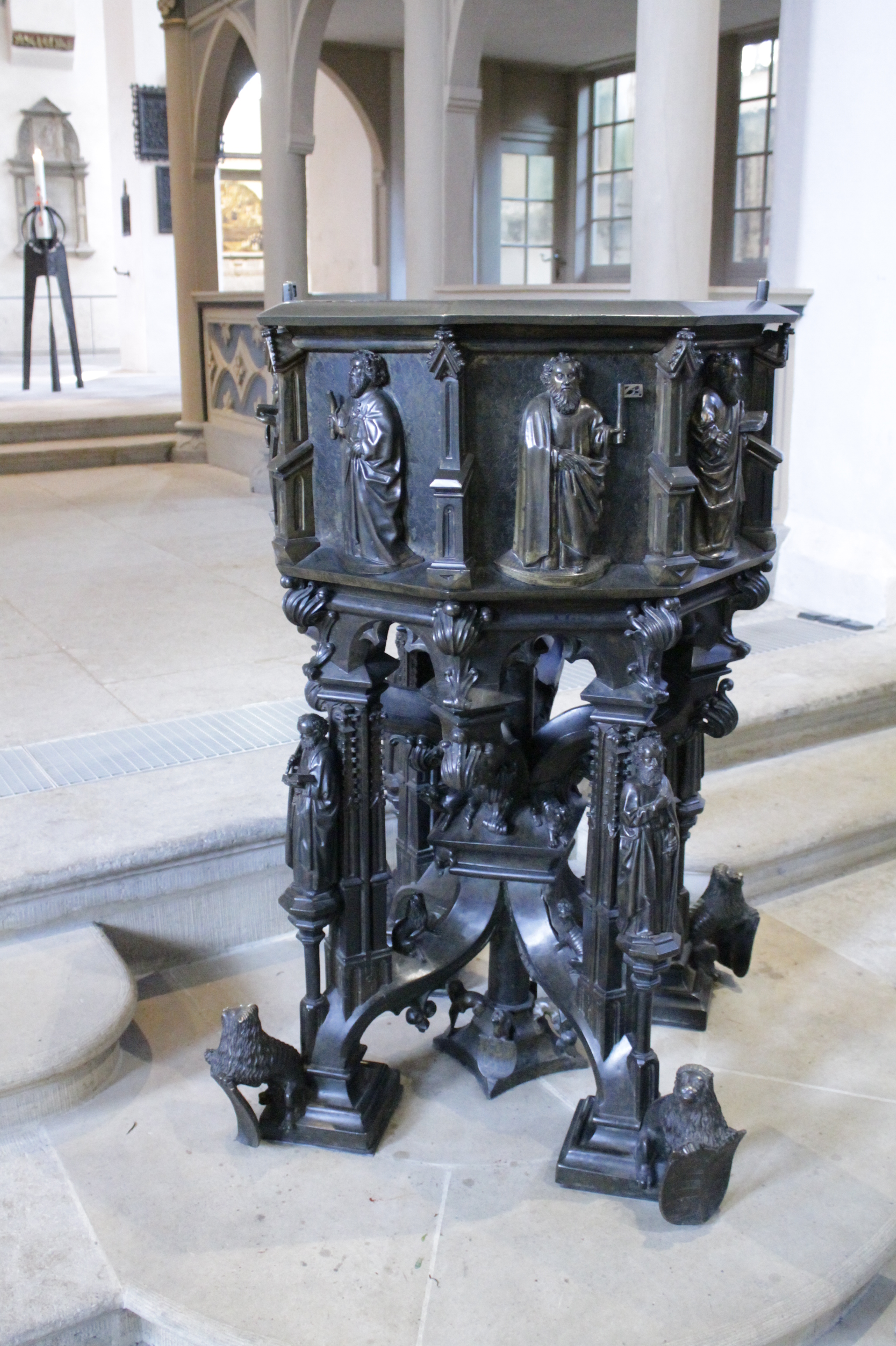
Font by Hermann Vischer the Elder, St Mary's Church, Wittenberg

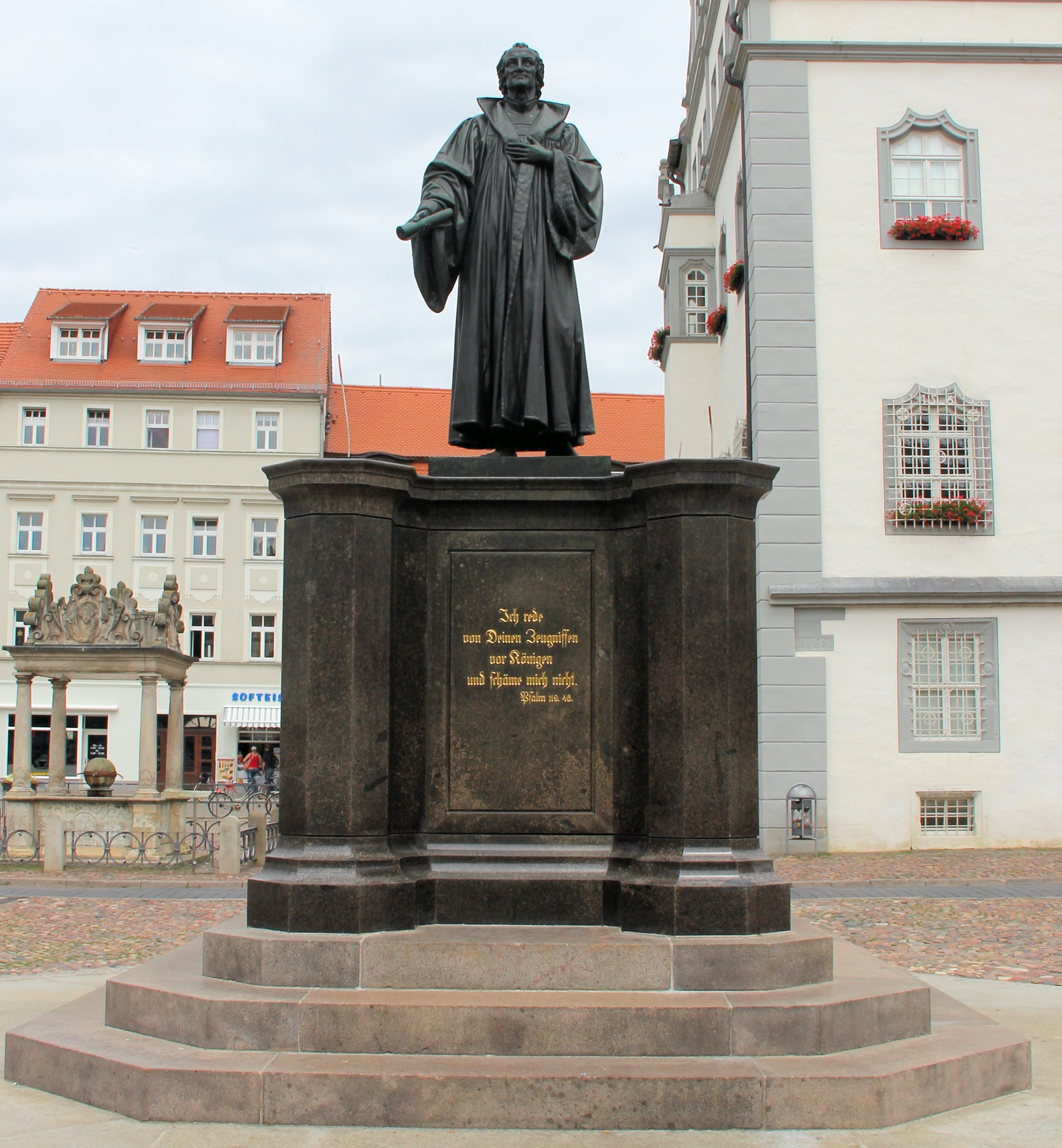
Philipp Melanchthon in the market square

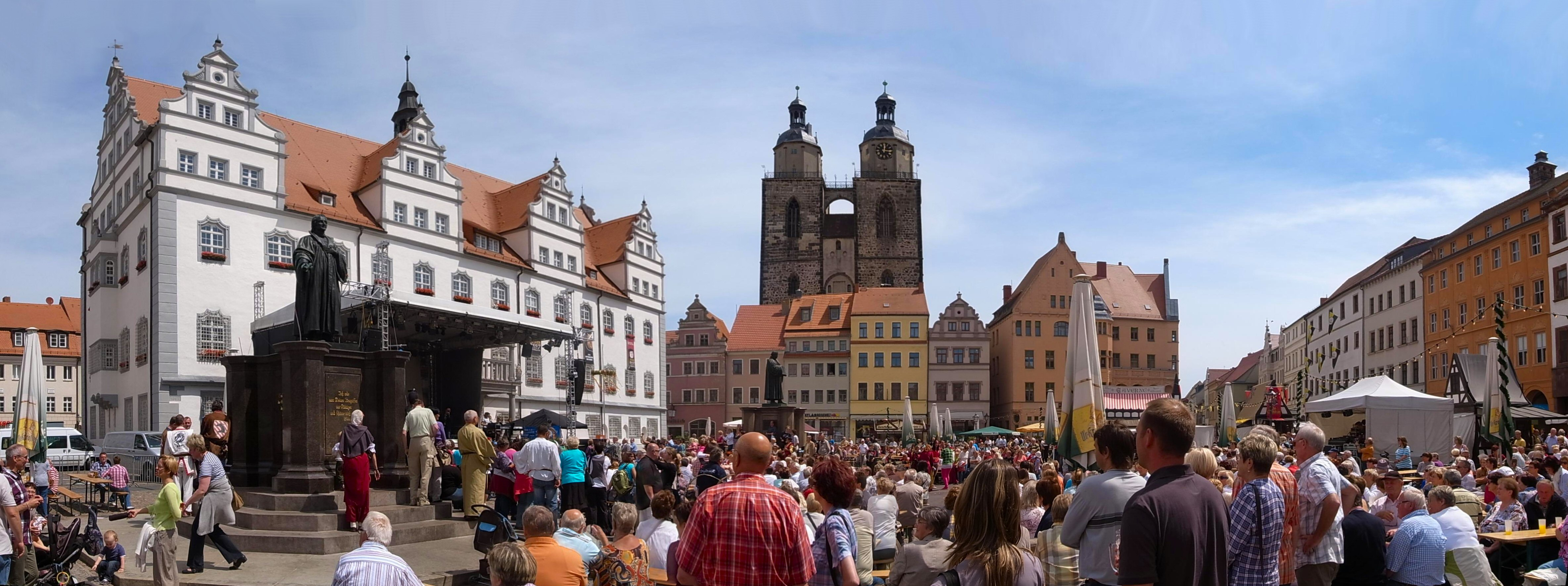
Market square, with ancient town hall, statue of Martin Luther and Stadtkirche

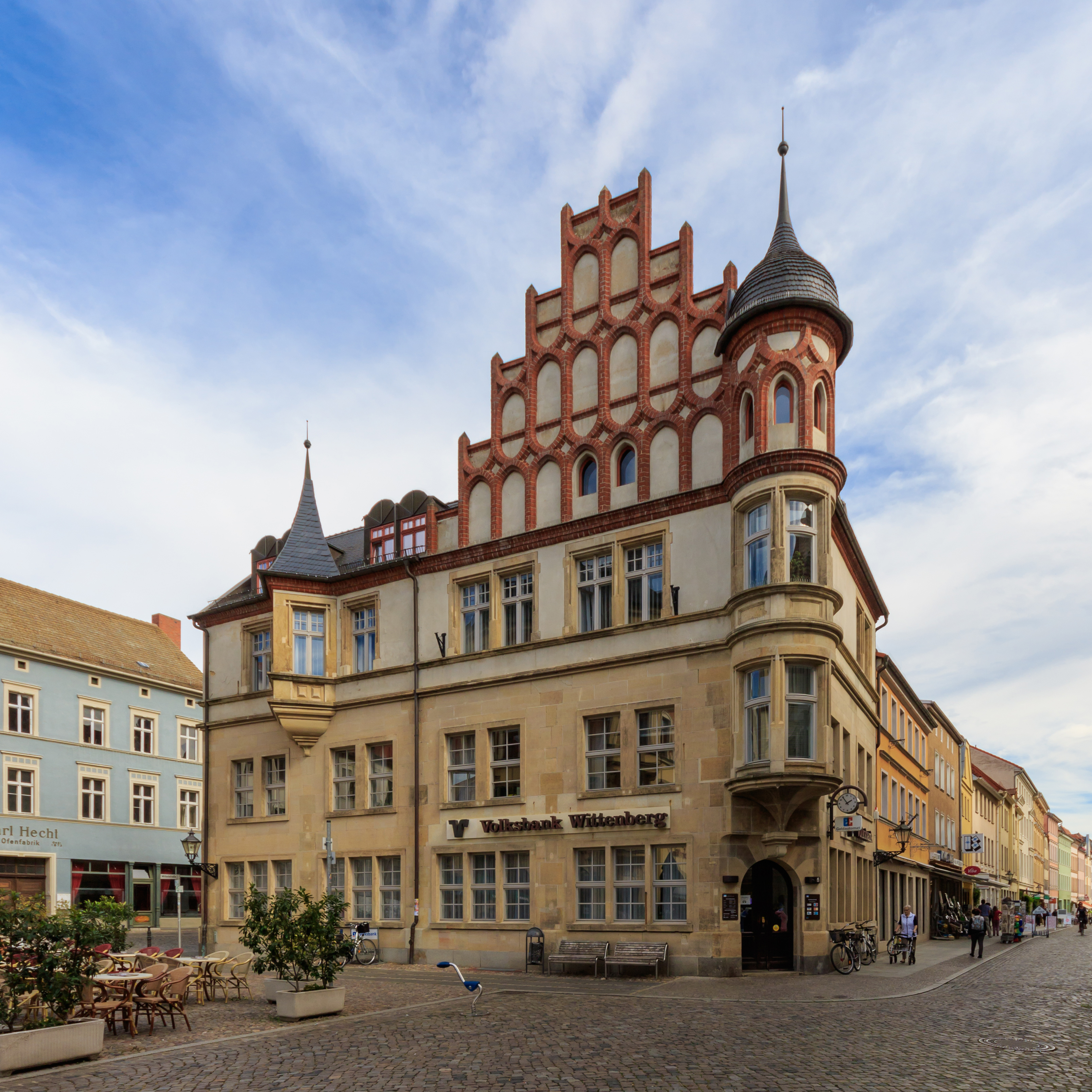
Hamlethaus at Wittenberg old town

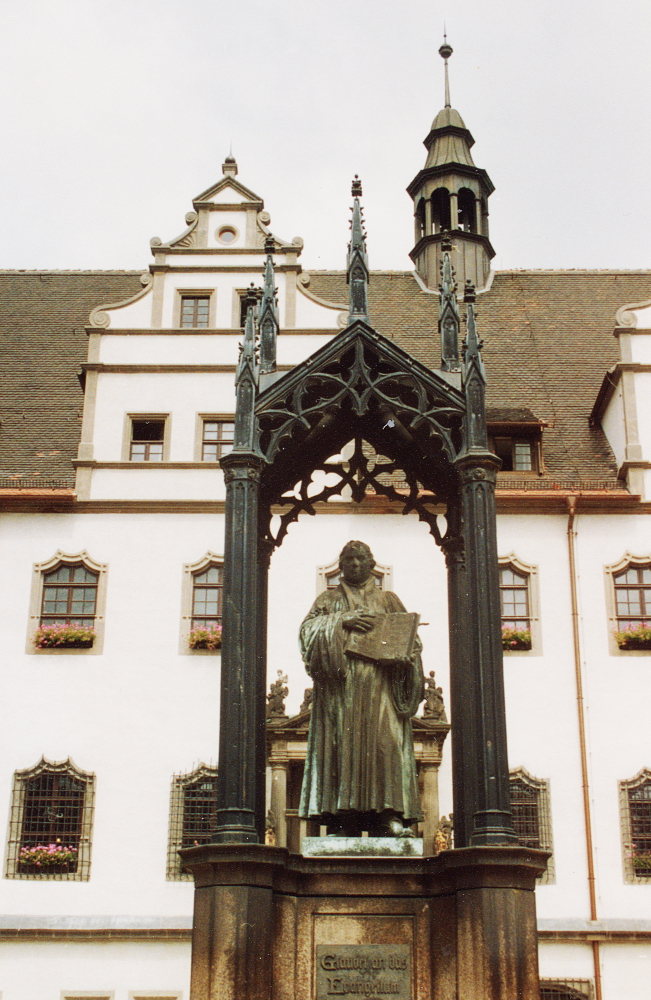
Maarten Luther Statue

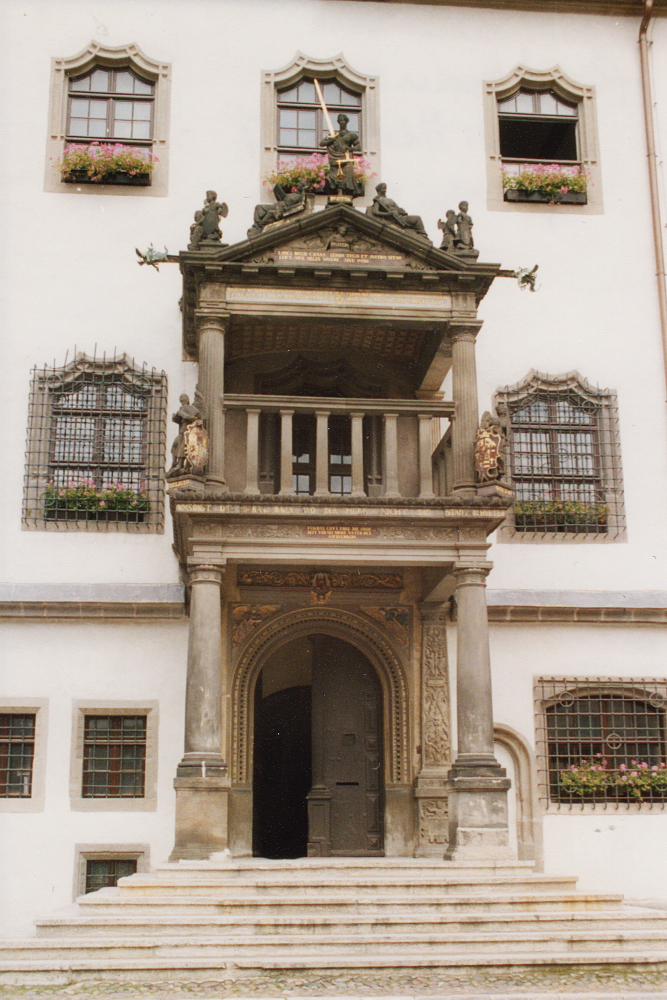
Town hall

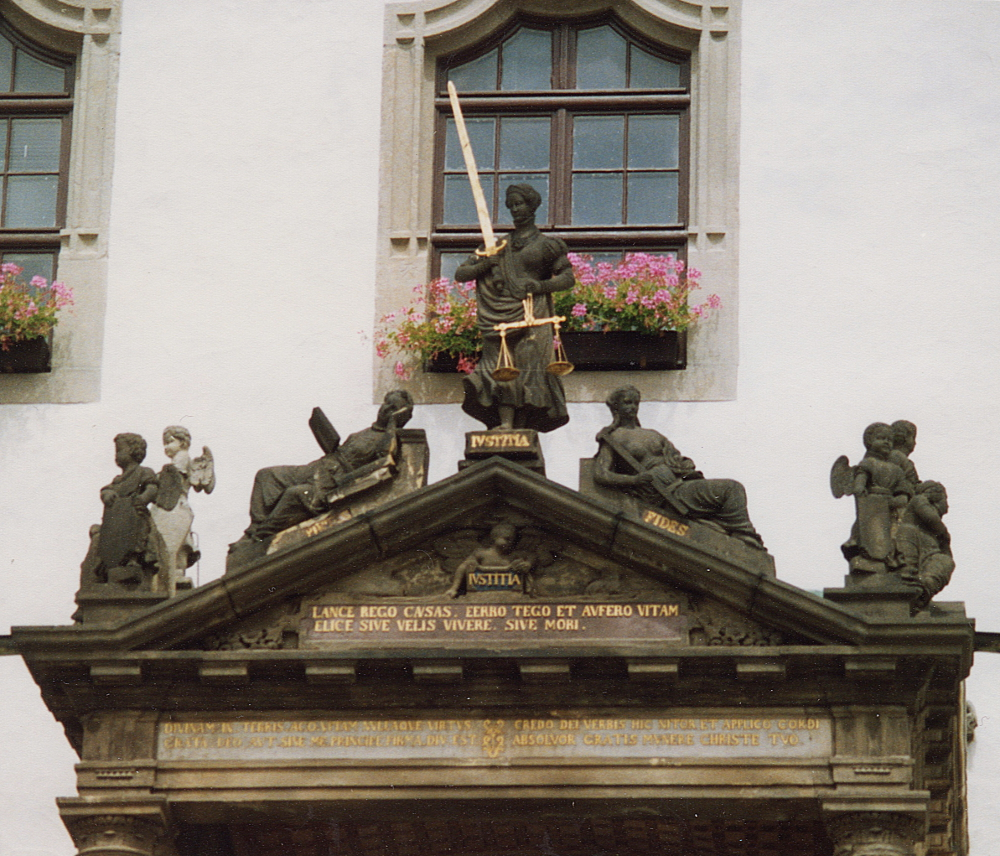
Facade images, town hall

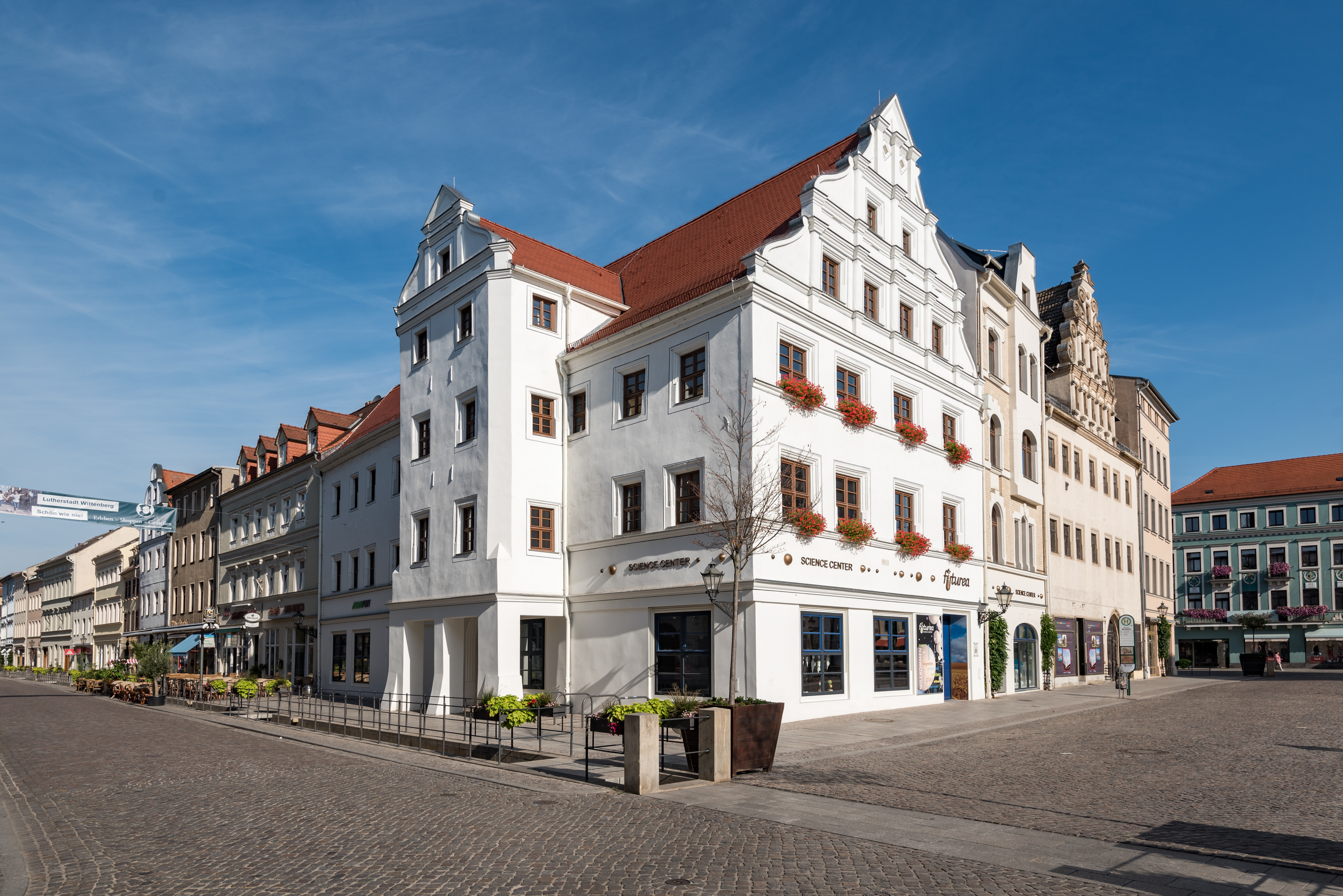
Futurea Science Center museum at market

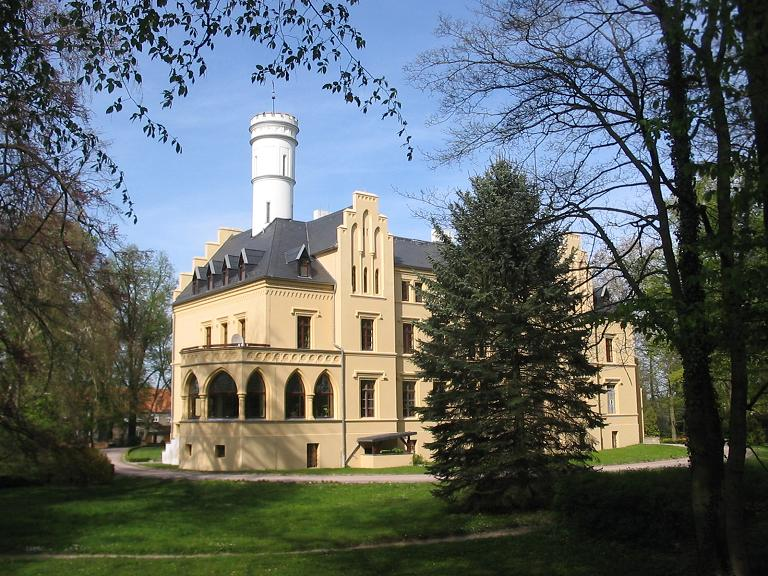
Kropstädt Castle

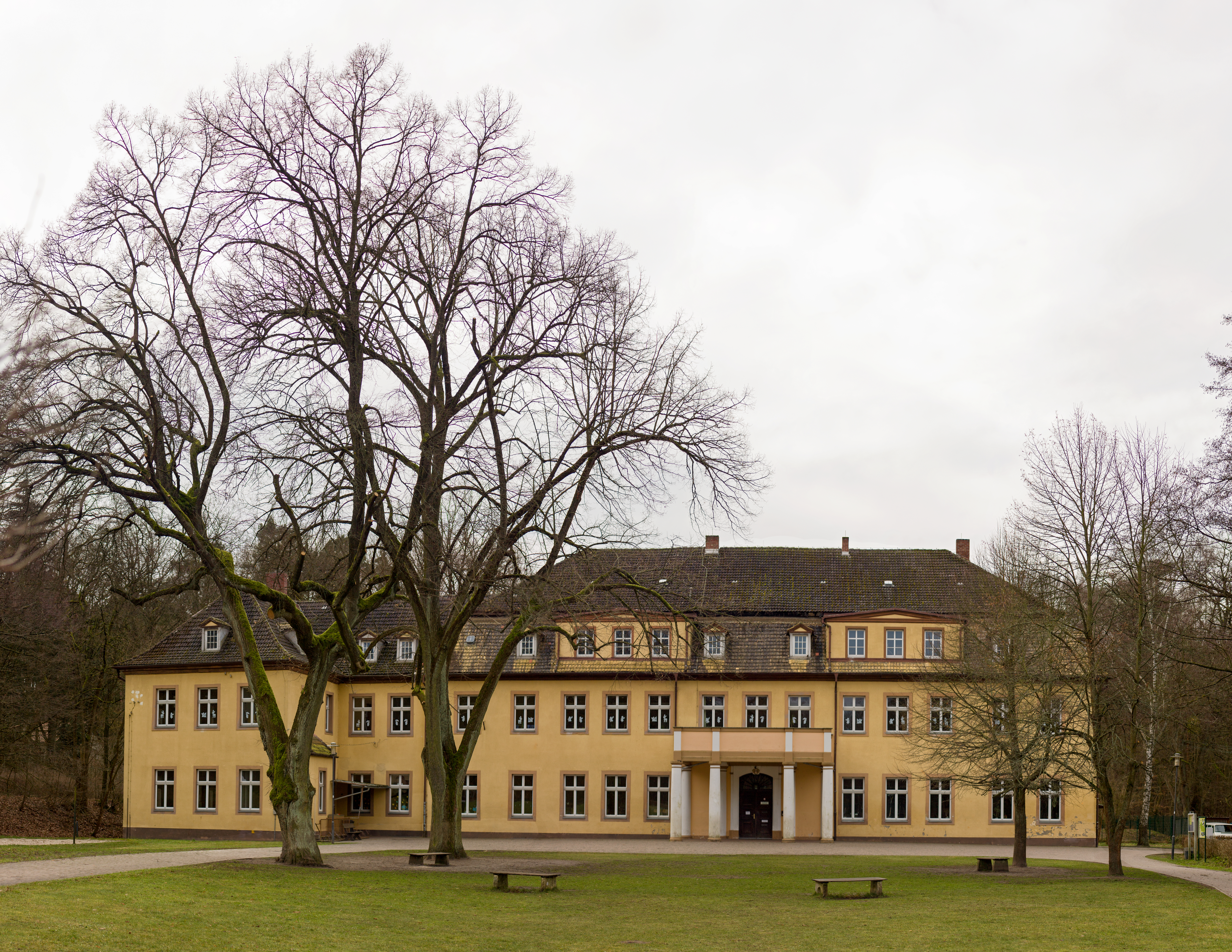
Nudersdorf Castle
