= Elbaue-Fläming =

Coordinates: 51°55′N 12°47′E

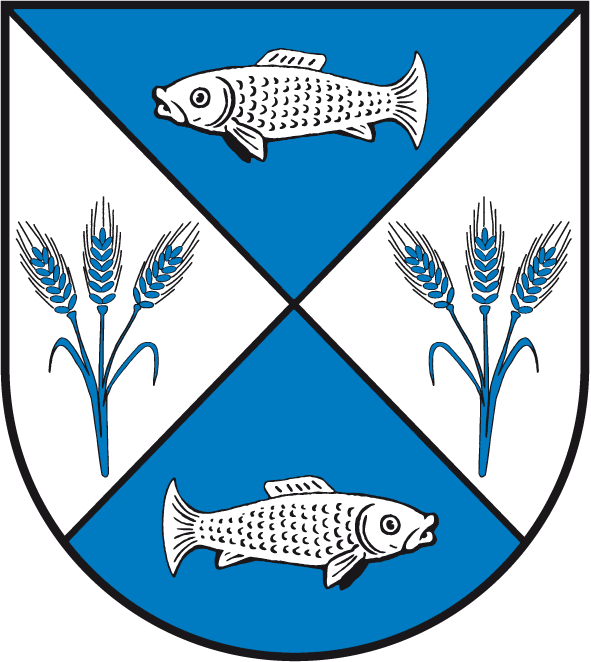
Coat of arms VG Elbaue-Fläming

Elbaue-Fläming was a Verwaltungsgemeinschaft ("administrative community") in the district of Wittenberg, in Saxony-Anhalt, Germany. It was situated on the right bank of the Elbe, north and east of Wittenberg. The seat of the Verwaltungsgemeinschaft was in Zahna. It was disbanded in January 2011.

The Verwaltungsgemeinschaft Elbaue-Fläming consisted of the following municipalities (population in 2005 in brackets):

- Dietrichsdorf (258)
- Elster (Elbe) (2,643)
- Gadegast (227)
- Klöden (653)
- Leetza (377)
- Listerfehrda (366)
- Mühlanger (1,477)
- Schützberg (162)
- Zahna * (4,440)
- Zemnick (139)
- Zörnigall (960)
