= Abtsdorf =

- Stadtteil of Wittenberg
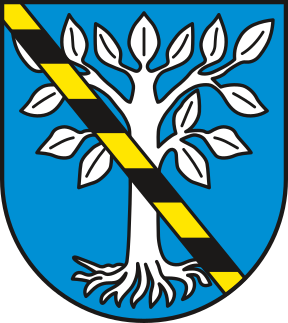
- Coat of arms
- Interactive map of Abtsdorf
- Location within Germany Location within Saxony-Anhalt
- Coordinates: 51°53′25″N 12°43′46″E
- Country: Germany
- State: Saxony-Anhalt
- District: Wittenberg
- Town: Wittenberg

Area
  - Total: 9.70 km^{2} (3.75 sq mi)
- Elevation: 101 m (331 ft)

Population (2006-12-31)
  - Total: 1,392
  - Density: 144/km^{2} (372/sq mi)
- Time zone: UTC+01:00 (CET)
  - Summer (DST): UTC+02:00 (CEST)
- Postal codes: 06888
- Dialling codes: 03491
- Vehicle registration: WB

Abtsdorf is a village and a former municipality in the Wittenberg district of Saxony-Anhalt in Germany. Since 1 January 2009, it has been part of the town of Wittenberg.

== Transport ==
On the community's southern edge lies the Zörnigall railway station on the Anhalter Bahn line, served every other hour by the Regionalexpress between Wittenberg and Berlin run by DB Regio AG.

Federal Highway (Bundesstraße) B 2 from Wittenberg to Leipzig runs about 4 km northwest of the community, and the B 187 from Roßlau to Wittenberg and Jessen about 4 km to the south.

The nearest Autobahn interchanges are at Klein Marzehns and Coswig on A 9, both about 25 km away.

== Sources ==
- Wittenberg municipal website: Abtsdorf
- Landkreis Wittenberg Amtsblatt 2008
- Dorfverein Abtsdorf
- Absdorf. In: August Schumann: Vollständiges Staats-, Post- und Zeitungslexikon von Sachsen. vol. 1, p. 4. Zwickau 1814
