= Leetza =

- Ortsteil of Zahna-Elster
- Interactive map of Leetza
- Location within Germany Location within Saxony-Anhalt
- Coordinates: 51°53′N 12°49′E
- Country: Germany
- State: Saxony-Anhalt
- District: Wittenberg
- Town: Zahna-Elster

Area
  - Total: 21.86 km^{2} (8.44 sq mi)
- Elevation: 75 m (246 ft)

Population (2009-12-31)
  - Total: 359
  - Density: 16.4/km^{2} (42.5/sq mi)
- Time zone: UTC+01:00 (CET)
  - Summer (DST): UTC+02:00 (CEST)
- Postal codes: 06895
- Dialling codes: 034924
- Vehicle registration: WB

Leetza is a village and a former municipality in Wittenberg district in Saxony-Anhalt, Germany. Since 1 January 2011, it is part of the town Zahna-Elster. The municipality belonged to the administrative municipality (Verwaltungsgemeinschaft) of Elbaue-Fläming.

The village has a historic church (kirche) that was restored in 2014.

== Geography ==
Leetza lies about 14 km east of Lutherstadt Wittenberg.

== Economy and transportation ==
Federal Highway (Bundesstraße) B 187 between Wittenberg and Jessen is about 7 km to the south.
