= Elster (Elbe) =

- Ortsteil of Zahna-Elster
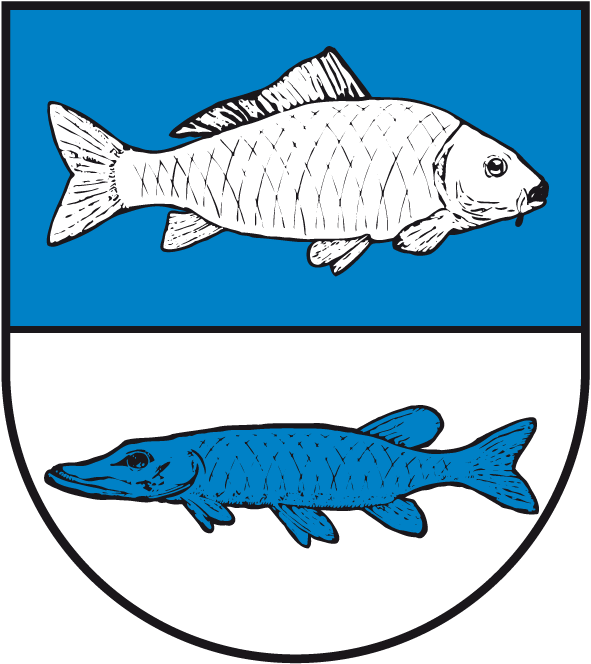
- Coat of arms
- Interactive map of Elster
- Location within Germany Location within Saxony-Anhalt
- Coordinates: 51°49′46″N 12°49′29″E
- Country: Germany
- State: Saxony-Anhalt
- District: Wittenberg
- Town: Zahna-Elster

Area
  - Total: 20.68 km^{2} (7.98 sq mi)
- Elevation: 77 m (253 ft)

Population (2009-12-31)
  - Total: 2,527
  - Density: 122.2/km^{2} (316.5/sq mi)
- Time zone: UTC+01:00 (CET)
  - Summer (DST): UTC+02:00 (CEST)
- Postal codes: 06918
- Dialling codes: 035383
- Vehicle registration: WB
- Website: www.elster-elbe.de

Elster (Elbe) (German pronunciation: [ˈɛlstɐ]) is a village and a former municipality in Saxony-Anhalt, Germany located in Wittenberg district. Since 1 January 2011, it is part of the town Zahna-Elster. From 2005 until 2011 it belonged to the administrative municipality (Verwaltungsgemeinschaft) of Elbaue-Fläming, before 2005 it belonged to the administrative community of Elster-Seyda-Klöden.

== Geography and transport ==
The community lies about 15 km east of Wittenberg and 10 km west of Jessen. Through the community runs the Federal Highway (Bundesstraße) B 187 and the railway line between Wittenberg and Cottbus.

It lies at the mouth of the Black Elster, where it empties into the Elbe. The International Bicycle Trail R2 runs through Elster along the Elbe. A reaction ferry is still used here for crossing the river. Scenically charming are the Elbauen, which at high water work as natural polders. During the so-called Flood of the Century in 2006, these natural polders were not high enough to keep the water back, leading to a great deal of the community being flooded.

Moreover, in 2004, a new landing stage was dedicated where Elbe cruise ships now stop.

== History ==
Elster had its first documentary mention in 1187 under the name Alstermunde. Until sometime before the Second World War, it was an important shipping and fishing community. Nowadays, the biggest employers are agriculture and small handicraft businesses.

From 1815 to 1944, Elster was part of the Prussian Province of Saxony and from 1944 to 1945 of the Province of Halle-Merseburg.

After World War II, Elster was incorporated into the Province (since 1947, State) of Saxony-Anhalt from 1945 to 1952 and the Bezirk Cottbus of East Germany from 1952 to 1990. Since 1990, Elster has been part of Saxony-Anhalt, since 2011 as a part of Zahna-Elster.

== Subdivisions ==
Elster consists of Iserbegka, Gielsdorf, Meltendorf, and Elster
