= Zemnick =

- Ortsteil of Zahna-Elster
- Interactive map of Zemnick
- Location within Germany Location within Saxony-Anhalt
- Coordinates: 51°52′0″N 12°50′48″E
- Country: Germany
- State: Saxony-Anhalt
- District: Wittenberg
- Town: Zahna-Elster

Area
  - Total: 6.83 km^{2} (2.64 sq mi)
- Elevation: 75 m (246 ft)

Population (2009-12-31)
  - Total: 123
  - Density: 18.0/km^{2} (46.6/sq mi)
- Time zone: UTC+01:00 (CET)
  - Summer (DST): UTC+02:00 (CEST)
- Postal codes: 06918
- Dialling codes: 035387
- Vehicle registration: WB

Zemnick is a village and a former municipality in Wittenberg district in Saxony-Anhalt, Germany. Since 1 January 2011, it is part of the town Zahna-Elster. It belonged to the administrative municipality (Verwaltungsgemeinschaft) of Elbaue-Fläming.

== Geography ==
Zemnick is a round village (Rundling) and lies about 19 km northeast of Lutherstadt Wittenberg.

== History ==
From 1815 to 1944, Zemnick was part of the Prussian Province of Saxony and from 1944 to 1945 of the Province of Halle-Merseburg.

After World War II, Zemnick was incorporated into the Province (since 1947, State) of Saxony-Anhalt from 1945 to 1952 and the Bezirk Cottbus of East Germany from 1952 to 1990. Since 1990, Zemnick has been part of Saxony-Anhalt, since 2011 as a part of Zahna-Elster.

== Buildings ==
In 1888, the church was built with an organ by Conrad Geissler.

== Economy and transportation ==
Federal Highway (Bundesstraße) B 187 between Wittenberg and Jessen is about 5 km to the south.
