= Gadegast =

- Ortsteil of Zahna-Elster
- Coat of arms
- Interactive map of Gadegast
- Location within Germany Location within Saxony-Anhalt
- Coordinates: 51°53′N 12°54′E
- Country: Germany
- State: Saxony-Anhalt
- District: Wittenberg
- Town: Zahna-Elster

Area
  - Total: 11.15 km^{2} (4.31 sq mi)
- Elevation: 77 m (253 ft)

Population (2009-12-31)
  - Total: 196
  - Density: 17.6/km^{2} (45.5/sq mi)
- Time zone: UTC+01:00 (CET)
  - Summer (DST): UTC+02:00 (CEST)
- Postal codes: 06918
- Dialling codes: 035387
- Vehicle registration: WB

Gadegast is a village and a former municipality in Wittenberg district in Saxony-Anhalt, Germany. Since 1 January 2011, it is part of the town Zahna-Elster. The municipality belonged to the administrative municipality (Verwaltungsgemeinschaft) of Elbaue-Fläming.

== Geography ==
Gadegast lies about 17 km east of Lutherstadt Wittenberg.

== History ==
Gadegast had its first documentary mention in 1385. In 1508, the name was written Gathegast, and in 1550 Gategast. The community lay until 1815 in the Saxon Amt of Seyda, whereafter it became Prussian.

In 1550, 32 men who owned property lived in the community, among them 18 gardeners who were directly under the Amt's authority. The village had its own court seat and judge. Moreover, it had its own parish church.

Also at that time, Gadegast bordered on the villages of Schadewalde, Mellnitz, Zallmsdorf, and Seyda.

From 1815 to 1944, Gadegast was part of the Prussian Province of Saxony and from 1944 to 1945 of the Province of Halle-Merseburg.

After World War II, Gadegast was incorporated into the Province (since 1947, State) of Saxony-Anhalt from 1945 to 1952 and the Bezirk Cottbus of East Germany from 1952 to 1990. Since 1990, Gadegast has been part of Saxony-Anhalt, since 2011 as a part of Zahna-Elster.

== Transportation ==
Federal Highway (Bundesstraße) B 187 between Jessen and Wittenberg lies 11 km to the south of the community.
