= Coswig (Verwaltungsgemeinschaft) =

Coordinates: 51°53′N 12°26′E

Coswig (Anhalt) is a former Verwaltungsgemeinschaft ("administrative community") in the district of Wittenberg, in Saxony-Anhalt, Germany. The seat of the Verwaltungsgemeinschaft was in Coswig. It was disbanded in September 2010.

The Verwaltungsgemeinschaft of Coswig (Anhalt) consisted of the following municipalities (population in 2008 in brackets):

1. Coswig (12,917)
2. Thießen (700)
