= Mochau, Saxony-Anhalt =

Mochau
- Stadtteil of Wittenberg
- Interactive map of Mochau
- Location within Germany Location within Saxony-Anhalt
- Coordinates: 51°56′N 12°41′E
- Country: Germany
- State: Saxony-Anhalt
- District: Wittenberg
- Town: Wittenberg

Area
  - Total: 10.96 km^{2} (4.23 sq mi)
- Elevation: 134 m (440 ft)

Population (2006-12-31)
  - Total: 568
  - Density: 51.8/km^{2} (134/sq mi)
- Time zone: UTC+01:00 (CET)
  - Summer (DST): UTC+02:00 (CEST)
- Postal codes: 06888
- Dialling codes: 03491
- Vehicle registration: WB

Mochau is a village and a former municipality in Wittenberg district in Saxony-Anhalt, Germany. Since 1 January 2009, it is part of the town Wittenberg.

== History ==
Mochau was first mentioned in historical sources in 1378 as "Mochow". Until the early 20th century, Mochau and the nearby village of Theissen consisted of only a few farming establishments. The communities grew with the development of industry in Wittenberg, each becoming independent villages. Mochau and Theissen were combined into the single municipality (Gemeinde) of Mochau in 1974. In 2009, the community was incorporated into the town of Wittenberg, along with the municipality of Abtsdorf. Local support for incorporation into Wittenberg was reported to be around 80 percent of the community.

In the year before joining with Wittenberg, Mochau (meaning the villages of Mochau and Theissen combined as a municipality) had a total of 545 residents.

== Geography ==
Mochau lies about 7 km north of Lutherstadt Wittenberg in the Fläming.

== Economy and transportation ==
Federal Highway (Bundesstraße) B 2 between Wittenberg and Berlin is about 2 km to the east.
