= Mühlanger =

- Ortsteil of Zahna-Elster
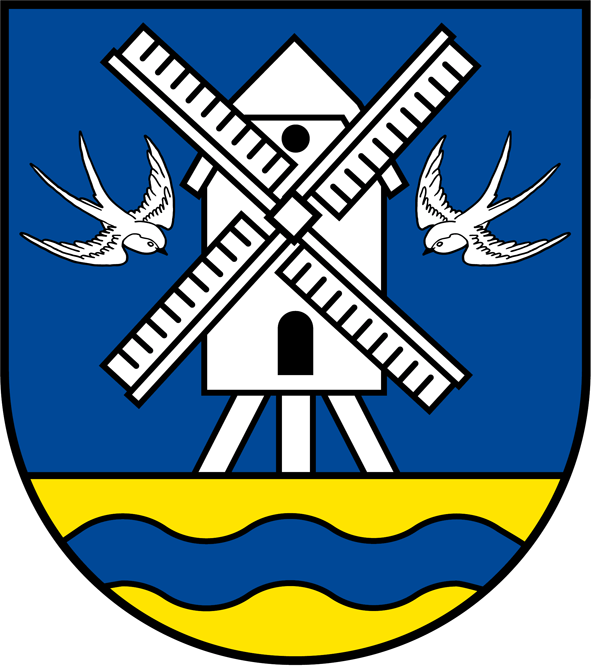
- Coat of arms
- Interactive map of Mühlanger
- Location within Germany Location within Saxony-Anhalt
- Coordinates: 51°51′N 12°45′E
- Country: Germany
- State: Saxony-Anhalt
- District: Wittenberg
- Town: Zahna-Elster

Area
  - Total: 12.21 km^{2} (4.71 sq mi)
- Elevation: 69 m (226 ft)

Population (2012-12-31)
  - Total: 1,330
  - Density: 109/km^{2} (282/sq mi)
- Time zone: UTC+01:00 (CET)
  - Summer (DST): UTC+02:00 (CEST)
- Postal codes: 06888
- Dialling codes: 034922
- Vehicle registration: WB
- Website: www.muehlanger.com

Mühlanger is a village and a former municipality in Wittenberg district in Saxony-Anhalt, Germany. Since 1 January 2014, it is part of the town Zahna-Elster. From 1 January 2011 until 29 May 2013, it was also part of Zahna-Elster, but this was reverted by court decision. Previously the municipality belonged to the administrative municipality (Verwaltungsgemeinschaft) of Elbaue-Fläming.

== Geography ==
Mühlanger lies about 9 km east of Lutherstadt Wittenberg on the Elbe. It has three subdivisions: Hohndorf, Prühlitz and Gallin. Federal Highway (Bundesstraße) B 187 running from Wittenberg to Jessen runs right through the community.

== History ==
Hohndorf had its first documentary mention in 1304. The municipality Mühlanger was founded in 1939 by uniting the villages of Prühlitz and Hohndorf. Gallin was amalgamated in 1974.

=== Regular events ===
The Park and Homeland Festival takes place yearly in early July.
