= Dietrichsdorf =

- Ortsteil of Zahna-Elster
- Interactive map of Dietrichsdorf
- Location within Germany Location within Saxony-Anhalt
- Coordinates: 51°52′4″N 12°46′56″E
- Country: Germany
- State: Saxony-Anhalt
- District: Wittenberg
- Town: Zahna-Elster

Area
  - Total: 10.62 km^{2} (4.10 sq mi)
- Elevation: 77 m (253 ft)

Population (2009-12-31)
  - Total: 209
  - Density: 19.7/km^{2} (51.0/sq mi)
- Time zone: UTC+01:00 (CET)
  - Summer (DST): UTC+02:00 (CEST)
- Postal codes: 06888
- Dialling codes: 034922
- Vehicle registration: WB

Dietrichsdorf is a village and a former municipality in Wittenberg district in Saxony-Anhalt, Germany. Since 1 January 2011, it is part of the town Zahna-Elster. From 1 January 2005 until January 2011 the municipality belonged to the administrative municipality (Verwaltungsgemeinschaft) of Elbaue-Fläming, and before that to the administrative municipality of Mühlengrund.

== Geography and transport ==
The community lies 9 km (6 mi) east of Wittenberg on the north bank of the Elbe. Through the community run the Federal Highway (Bundesstraße) B 187 and the railway line between Wittenberg and Cottbus.

== History ==
The originally Slavic community of Dietrichsdorf had its first documentary mention on 14 November 1385. It was however named after the colonization leader Dietrich who led a group of German settlers during the East Colonization; the original Slavic name was not kept.

The subdivision of Külso had its first documentary mention in 1378. Külso, too, is of Slavic origin. The name comes from koko, meaning "rounding", "circle" or "round village", which most likely refers to the village's original shape. Since 1942, the community has been part of Dietrichsdorf.

== Subdivisions ==
Dietrichsdorf has the following subdivisions: Gallin and Külso.

== Sightseeing ==
- Brick church built in 1705
- Mill in Dietrichsdorf
