= Köselitz (disambiguation) =

Köselitz is a former village and municipality in the district of Wittenberg, Saxony-Anhalt, Germany.

Köselitz may also refer to:

- former name of Kozielice, Pyrzyce County, Poland
- a subdivision of the Röderaue municipality, Germany
- Heinrich Köselitz, German author and composer
