= Naundorf bei Seyda =

- Stadtteil of Jessen
- Interactive map of Naundorf bei Seyda
- Location within Germany Location within Saxony-Anhalt
- Coordinates: 51°55′27″N 12°53′21″E
- Country: Germany
- State: Saxony-Anhalt
- District: Wittenberg
- Town: Jessen

Area
  - Total: 12.77 km^{2} (4.93 sq mi)
- Elevation: 99 m (325 ft)

Population (2021)
  - Total: 108
  - Density: 8.46/km^{2} (21.9/sq mi)
- Time zone: UTC+01:00 (CET)
  - Summer (DST): UTC+02:00 (CEST)
- Postal codes: 06918
- Dialling codes: 035387
- Vehicle registration: WB

Naundorf bei Seyda is a village and a former municipality in the district of Wittenberg, in Saxony-Anhalt, Germany. Since 1 January 2010, it is part of the town Jessen.

== Geography ==
Naundorf bei Seyda lies about 17 km northeast of Lutherstadt Wittenberg in the Fläming.

Naundorf bei Seyda has a subdivision: Mark Friedersdorf.

== History ==
The community had its first documentary mention in 1459.

From 1815 to 1944, Naundorf bei Seyda was part of the Prussian Province of Saxony and from 1944 to 1945 of the Province of Halle-Merseburg.

After World War II, Naundorf bei Seyda was incorporated into the Province (since 1947, State) of Saxony-Anhalt from 1945 to 1952 and the Bezirk Cottbus of East Germany from 1952 to 1990. Since 1990, Naundorf bei Seyda has been part of Saxony-Anhalt, since 2011 as a part of Jessen.

== Economy and transportation ==
Federal Highway (Bundesstraße) B 2 between Berlin and Wittenberg lies 12 km west of the community.
