= Serno =

- Stadtteil of Coswig (Anhalt)
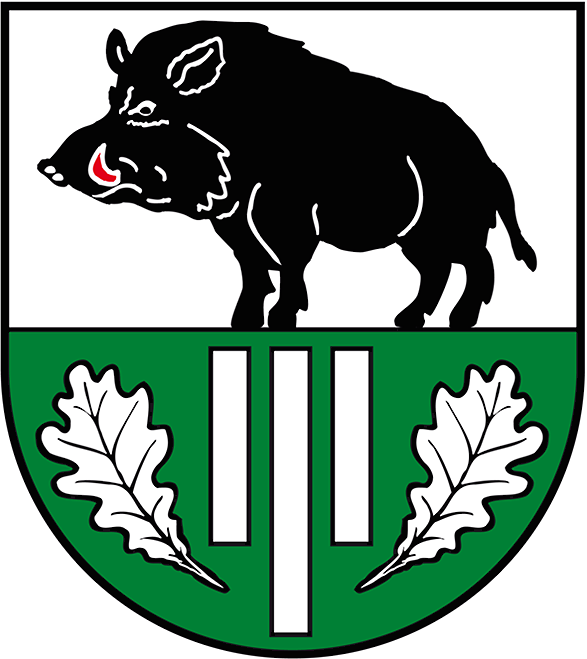
- Coat of arms
- Interactive map of Serno
- Location within Germany Location within Saxony-Anhalt
- Coordinates: 52°00′N 12°25′E
- Country: Germany
- State: Saxony-Anhalt
- District: Wittenberg
- Town: Coswig (Anhalt)

Area
  - Total: 33.86 km^{2} (13.07 sq mi)
- Elevation: 119 m (390 ft)

Population (2006-12-31)
  - Total: 443
  - Density: 13.1/km^{2} (33.9/sq mi)
- Time zone: UTC+01:00 (CET)
  - Summer (DST): UTC+02:00 (CEST)
- Postal codes: 06862
- Dialling codes: 034907
- Vehicle registration: WB

Serno is a village and a former municipality in the district of Wittenberg, Saxony-Anhalt, Germany. Since 1 January 2009, it is part of the town Coswig (Anhalt).
