= Straach =

- Stadtteil of Wittenberg
- Interactive map of Straach
- Location within Germany Location within Saxony-Anhalt
- Coordinates: 51°57′N 12°36′E
- Country: Germany
- State: Saxony-Anhalt
- District: Wittenberg
- Town: Wittenberg

Area
  - Total: 22.64 km^{2} (8.74 sq mi)
- Elevation: 119 m (390 ft)

Population (2006-12-31)
  - Total: 880
  - Density: 39/km^{2} (100/sq mi)
- Time zone: UTC+01:00 (CET)
  - Summer (DST): UTC+02:00 (CEST)
- Postal codes: 06896
- Dialling codes: 034929
- Vehicle registration: WB

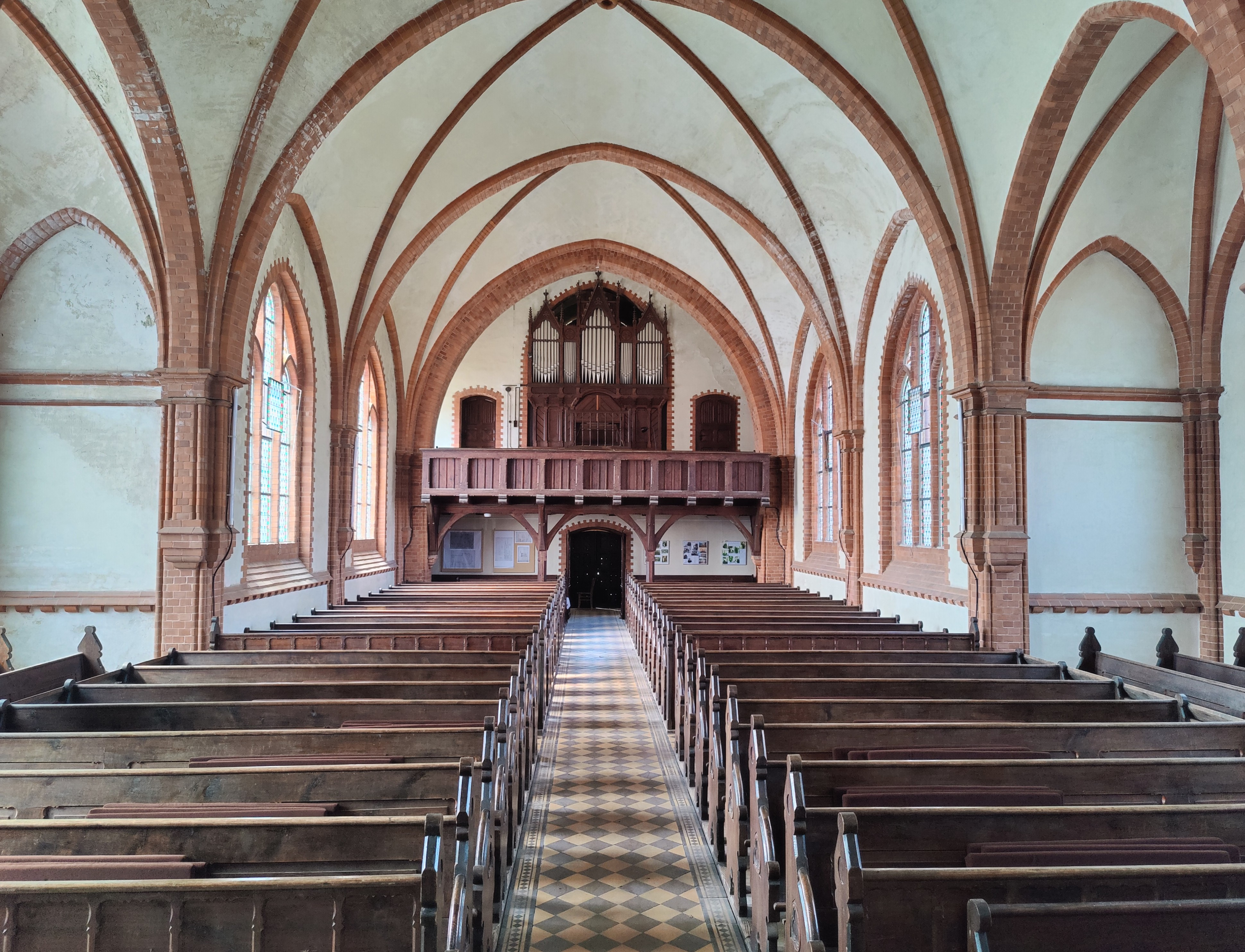
The village church of Straach

Straach (German pronunciation: [ʃtraːx]) is a village and a former municipality in Wittenberg district in Saxony-Anhalt, Germany. Since 1 January 2010, it is part of the town Wittenberg.

== Geography ==
Straach lies about 9 km east of Lutherstadt Wittenberg.

== Economy and transportation ==
Federal Highway (Bundesstraße) B 2 between Berlin and Wittenberg is about 12 km to the east.
