= Griebo =

Coordinates: 51°53′N 12°31′E

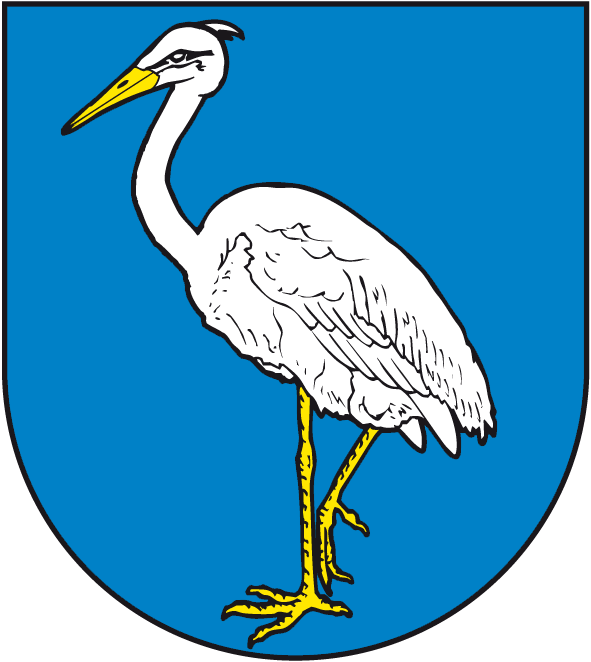
Coat of arms Griebo

Griebo is a former municipality in the district of Wittenberg, Saxony-Anhalt, Germany. Since January 2008, it is part of the town Wittenberg.
