= Bräsen =

- Stadtteil of Coswig
- Interactive map of Bräsen
- Location within Germany Location within Saxony-Anhalt
- Coordinates: 51°58′N 12°22′E
- Country: Germany
- State: Saxony-Anhalt
- District: Wittenberg
- Town: Coswig

Area
  - Total: 6.75 km^{2} (2.61 sq mi)
- Elevation: 100 m (330 ft)

Population (2006-12-31)
  - Total: 165
  - Density: 24.4/km^{2} (63.3/sq mi)
- Time zone: UTC+01:00 (CET)
  - Summer (DST): UTC+02:00 (CEST)
- Postal codes: 06862
- Dialling codes: 034907
- Vehicle registration: WB

Bräsen is a village and a former municipality in the district of Wittenberg in Saxony-Anhalt, Germany. Since 1 January 2010, it is part of the town Coswig.
