= Zörnigall =

- Ortsteil of Zahna-Elster
- Interactive map of Zörnigall
- Location within Germany Location within Saxony-Anhalt
- Coordinates: 51°52′17″N 12°45′23″E
- Country: Germany
- State: Saxony-Anhalt
- District: Wittenberg
- Town: Zahna-Elster

Area
  - Total: 3.57 km^{2} (1.38 sq mi)
- Elevation: 76 m (249 ft)

Population (2009-12-31)
  - Total: 901
  - Density: 252/km^{2} (654/sq mi)
- Time zone: UTC+01:00 (CET)
  - Summer (DST): UTC+02:00 (CEST)
- Postal codes: 06888
- Dialling codes: 034922
- Vehicle registration: WB

Zörnigall is a village and a former municipality in Wittenberg district in Saxony-Anhalt, Germany. Since 1 January 2011, it is part of the town Zahna-Elster. It belonged to the administrative municipality (Verwaltungsgemeinschaft) of Elbaue-Fläming.

== Geography ==
Zörnigall lies about 8 km southeast of Lutherstadt Wittenberg.

== Economy and transportation ==
Federal Highway (Bundesstraße) B 187 between Wittenberg and Jessen is about 1 km to the south.
