= Cobbelsdorf =

- Stadtteil of Coswig (Anhalt)
- Interactive map of Cobbelsdorf
- Location within Germany Location within Saxony-Anhalt
- Coordinates: 51°58′N 12°31′E
- Country: Germany
- State: Saxony-Anhalt
- District: Wittenberg
- Town: Coswig (Anhalt)

Area
  - Total: 24.38 km^{2} (9.41 sq mi)
- Elevation: 151 m (495 ft)

Population (2006-12-31)
  - Total: 605
  - Density: 24.8/km^{2} (64.3/sq mi)
- Time zone: UTC+01:00 (CET)
  - Summer (DST): UTC+02:00 (CEST)
- Postal codes: 06869
- Dialling codes: 034923
- Vehicle registration: WB

Cobbelsdorf is a village and a former municipality in the district of Wittenberg, Saxony-Anhalt, Germany. Since 1 January 2009, it is part of the town Coswig (Anhalt).
