= Stackelitz =

- Stadtteil of Coswig
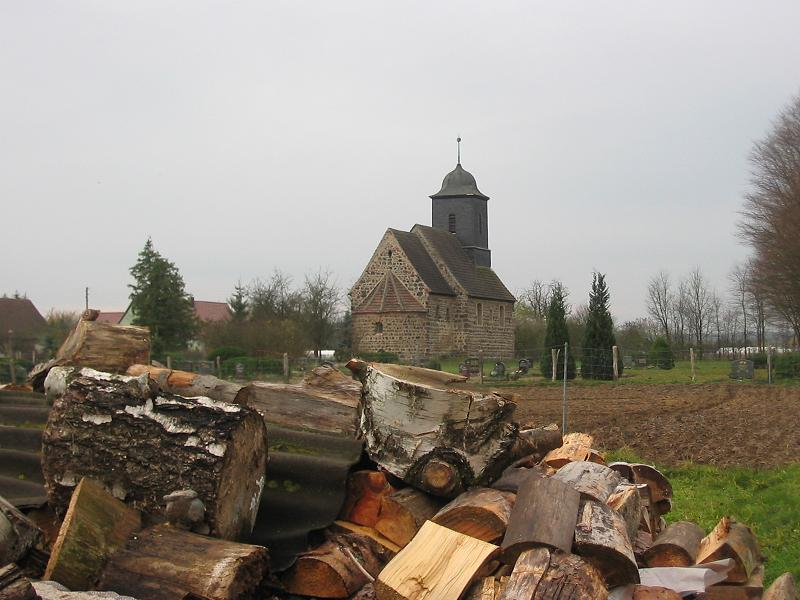
- Interactive map of Stackelitz
- Location within Germany Location within Saxony-Anhalt
- Coordinates: 52°0′N 12°22′E
- Country: Germany
- State: Saxony-Anhalt
- District: Wittenberg
- Town: Coswig

Area
  - Total: 17.58 km^{2} (6.79 sq mi)
- Elevation: 108 m (354 ft)

Population (2006-12-31)
  - Total: 203
  - Density: 11.5/km^{2} (29.9/sq mi)
- Time zone: UTC+01:00 (CET)
  - Summer (DST): UTC+02:00 (CEST)
- Postal codes: 06862
- Dialling codes: 034907
- Vehicle registration: WB

Stackelitz is a village and a former municipality in the district of Wittenberg in Saxony-Anhalt, Germany. Since 1 January 2010, it is part of the town Coswig.
