= Düben =

- Stadtteil of Coswig
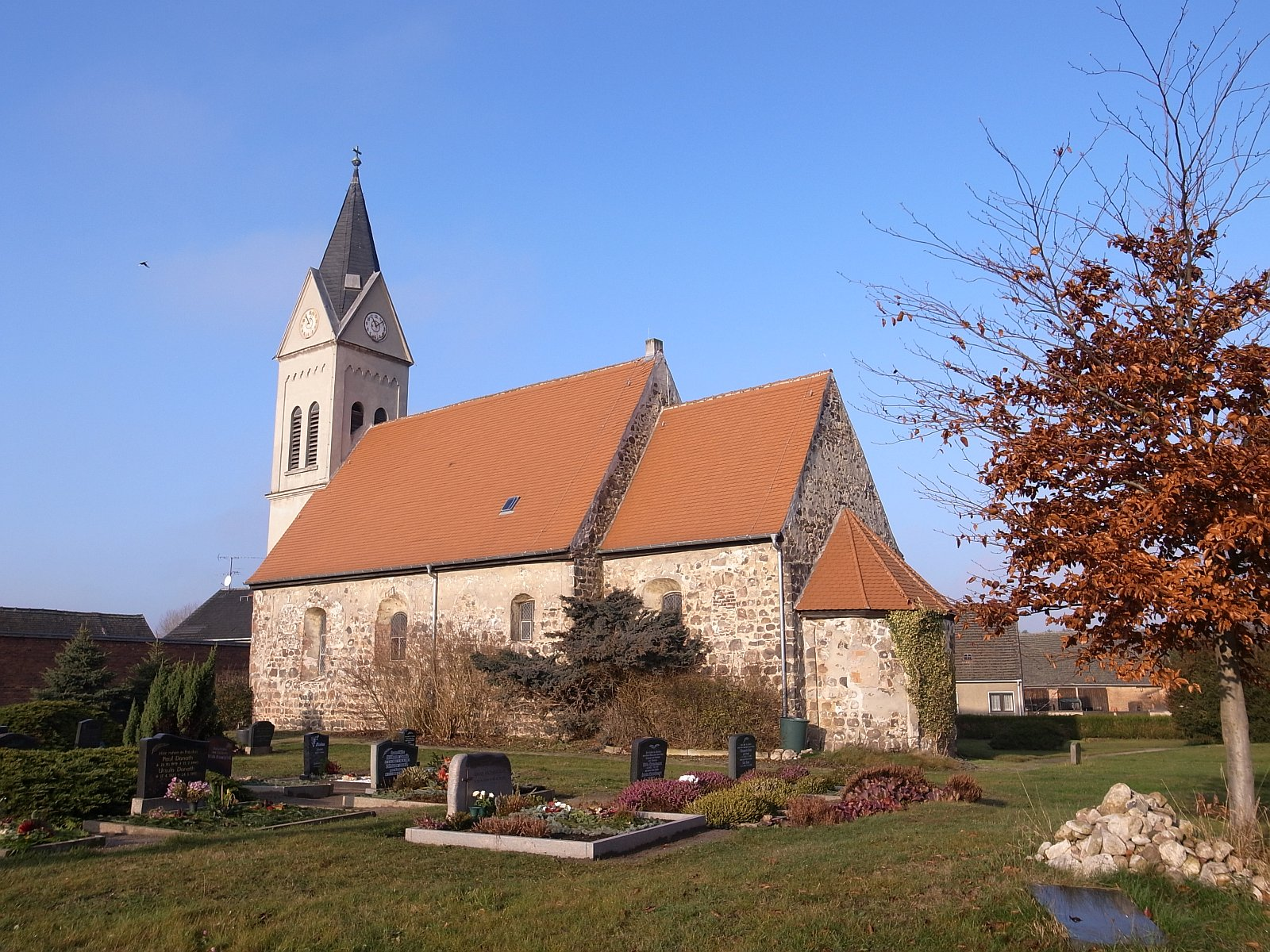
- Church of Saint Peter

- Coat of arms
- Interactive map of Düben
- Location within Germany Location within Saxony-Anhalt
- Coordinates: 51°55′N 12°22′E
- Country: Germany
- State: Saxony-Anhalt
- District: Wittenberg
- Town: Coswig

Area
  - Total: 12.25 km^{2} (4.73 sq mi)
- Elevation: 95 m (312 ft)

Population (2006-12-31)
  - Total: 271
  - Density: 22.1/km^{2} (57.3/sq mi)
- Time zone: UTC+01:00 (CET)
  - Summer (DST): UTC+02:00 (CEST)
- Postal codes: 06869
- Dialling codes: 034903
- Vehicle registration: WB

Düben is a village and a former municipality in the district of Wittenberg, Saxony-Anhalt, Germany. Since 1 March 2009, it is part of the town of Coswig.
