= Zahna =

Town in Saxony-Anhalt, Germany

- Ortsteil of Zahna-Elster
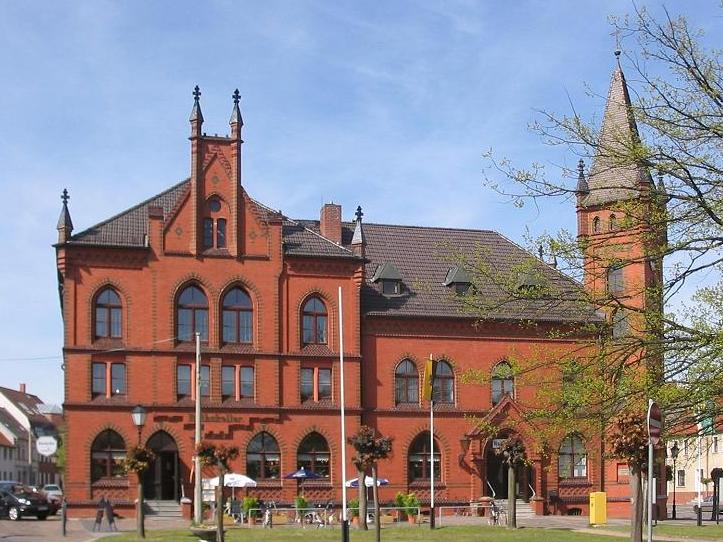
- Town hall built in 1897

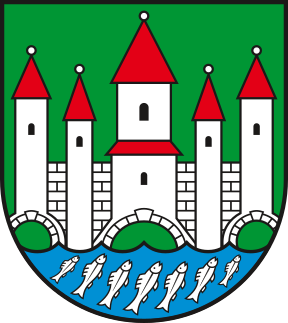
- Coat of arms
- Interactive map of Zahna
- Location within Germany Location within Saxony-Anhalt
- Coordinates: 51°55′N 12°47′E
- Country: Germany
- State: Saxony-Anhalt
- District: Wittenberg
- Town: Zahna-Elster

Area
  - Total: 54.99 km^{2} (21.23 sq mi)
- Elevation: 120 m (390 ft)

Population (2009-12-31)
  - Total: 4,131
  - Density: 75.12/km^{2} (194.6/sq mi)
- Time zone: UTC+01:00 (CET)
  - Summer (DST): UTC+02:00 (CEST)
- Postal codes: 06895
- Dialling codes: 034924
- Vehicle registration: WB

Zahna (German pronunciation: [ˈtsaːna]) is a town and a former municipality in Wittenberg district in Saxony-Anhalt, Germany not far from Federal Highway (Bundesstraße) B 2 and about 11 km east of Lutherstadt Wittenberg. It was the seat of the former administrative community (Verwaltungsgemeinschaft) of Elbaue-Fläming. Since 1 January 2011, it is part of the town Zahna-Elster.

== History ==
Zahna is one of Saxony-Anhalt's oldest towns. It has been proved that Zahna has been inhabited uninterruptedly since about 2000 BC. This has been established by archaeological findings from the 6th century BC up until the migration of the Semnoni who settled in the region.

After them came the Sorbs who took over their homes. The historic town core shows the form and structure that goes back to Flemish settlement in the High Middle Ages in the twelfth century.

The whole highland north of Wittenberg was so strongly shaped by the Flemings' ways of doing things that the whole area came to be named after them; to this day, it is still called the Fläming and the town belongs to the Fläming Nature Park, which was opened in 2005.

From 1815 to 1944, Zahna was part of the Prussian Province of Saxony and from 1944 to 1945 of the Province of Halle-Merseburg.

After World War II, Zahna was incorporated into the State of Saxony-Anhalt from 1945 to 1952 and the Bezirk Halle of East Germany from 1952 to 1990. Since 1990, Zahna has been part of Saxony-Anhalt, since 2011 as a part of Zahna-Elster.

== Town partnerships ==
- Stęszew near Poznań, Poland.
- Edemissen near Peine, Germany.
