= Boßdorf =

- Stadtteil of Wittenberg
- Interactive map of Boßdorf
- Location within Germany Location within Saxony-Anhalt
- Coordinates: 51°59′N 12°41′E
- Country: Germany
- State: Saxony-Anhalt
- District: Wittenberg
- Town: Wittenberg

Area
  - Total: 25.34 km^{2} (9.78 sq mi)
- Elevation: 147 m (482 ft)

Population (2006-12-31)
  - Total: 595
  - Density: 23.5/km^{2} (60.8/sq mi)
- Time zone: UTC+01:00 (CET)
  - Summer (DST): UTC+02:00 (CEST)
- Postal codes: 06895
- Dialling codes: 034920

Boßdorf (or Bossdorf) is a village and a former municipality in Wittenberg district in Saxony-Anhalt, Germany. Since 1 January 2010, it is part of the town Wittenberg. This village borders the districts of Assau, Kerzendorf, and Weddin.

== Geography ==
Boßdorf lies about 15 km north of Lutherstadt Wittenberg.

== Economy and transportation ==
Boßdorf is connected to Federal Highway (Bundesstraße) B 2, which lies 6 km east of the community, and joins Berlin and Wittenberg.
