= Hundeluft =

- Stadtteil of Coswig
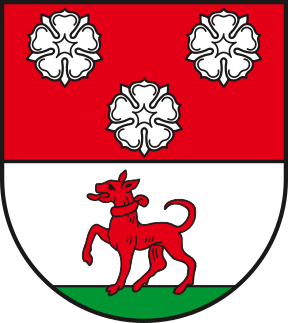
- Coat of arms
- Interactive map of Hundeluft
- Location within Germany Location within Saxony-Anhalt
- Coordinates: 51°58′N 12°20′E
- Country: Germany
- State: Saxony-Anhalt
- District: Wittenberg
- Town: Coswig

Area
  - Total: 7.78 km^{2} (3.00 sq mi)
- Elevation: 92 m (302 ft)

Population (2006-12-31)
  - Total: 259
  - Density: 33.3/km^{2} (86.2/sq mi)
- Time zone: UTC+01:00 (CET)
  - Summer (DST): UTC+02:00 (CEST)
- Postal codes: 06862
- Dialling codes: 034907
- Vehicle registration: WB

Hundeluft is a village and a former municipality in Wittenberg district in Saxony-Anhalt, Germany. Since 1 July 2009, it is part of the town Coswig. The name means "dog air".
