= Jeber-Bergfrieden =

- Stadtteil of Coswig
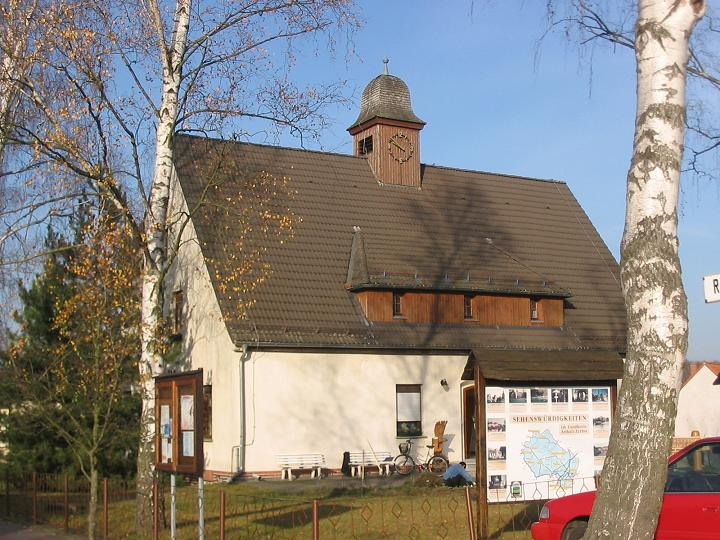

- Coat of arms
- Interactive map of Jeber-Bergfrieden
- Location within Germany Location within Saxony-Anhalt
- Coordinates: 51°58′N 12°20′E
- Country: Germany
- State: Saxony-Anhalt
- District: Wittenberg
- Town: Coswig

Area
  - Total: 16.29 km^{2} (6.29 sq mi)
- Elevation: 99 m (325 ft)

Population (2006-12-31)
  - Total: 641
  - Density: 39.3/km^{2} (102/sq mi)
- Time zone: UTC+01:00 (CET)
  - Summer (DST): UTC+02:00 (CEST)
- Postal codes: 06862
- Dialling codes: 034907
- Vehicle registration: WB

Jeber-Bergfrieden is a village and a former municipality in Wittenberg district in Saxony-Anhalt, Germany. Since 1 July 2009, it is part of the town Coswig.
