= Senst =

- Stadtteil of Coswig (Anhalt)
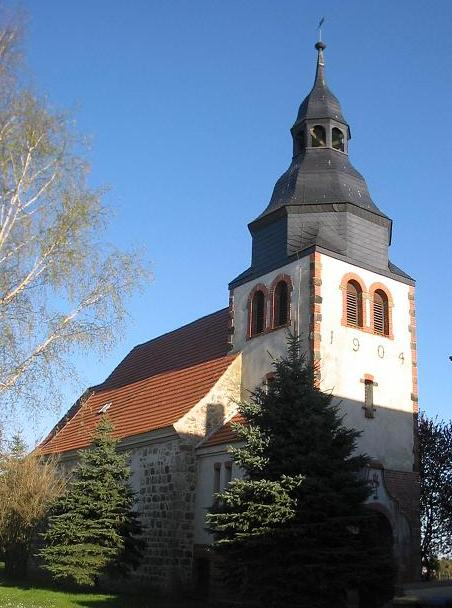

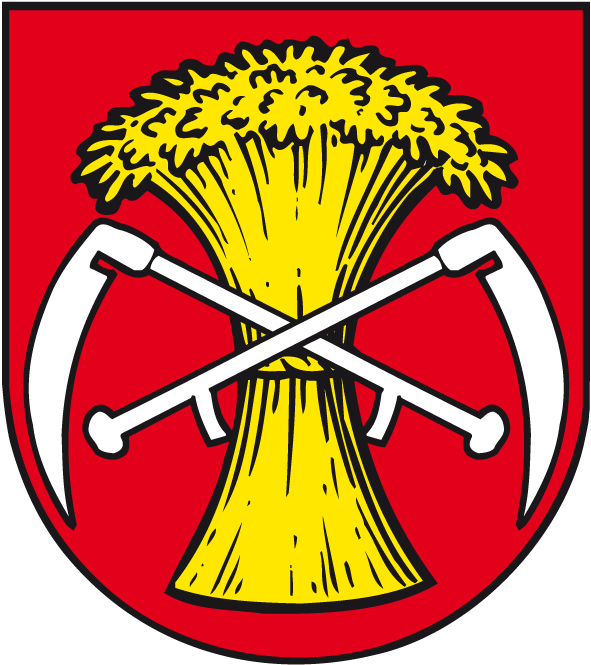
- Coat of arms
- Interactive map of Senst
- Location within Germany Location within Saxony-Anhalt
- Coordinates: 51°58′N 12°34′E
- Country: Germany
- State: Saxony-Anhalt
- District: Wittenberg
- Town: Coswig (Anhalt)

Area
  - Total: 12.45 km^{2} (4.81 sq mi)
- Elevation: 140 m (460 ft)

Population (2006-12-31)
  - Total: 239
  - Density: 19.2/km^{2} (49.7/sq mi)
- Time zone: UTC+01:00 (CET)
  - Summer (DST): UTC+02:00 (CEST)
- Postal codes: 06869
- Dialling codes: 034929
- Vehicle registration: WB

Senst is a village and a former municipality in the district of Wittenberg, Saxony-Anhalt, Germany. Since 1 January 2009, it is part of the town Coswig (Anhalt).
