= Möllensdorf =

- Stadtteil of Coswig
- Interactive map of Möllensdorf
- Location within Germany Location within Saxony-Anhalt
- Coordinates: 51°55′N 12°31′E
- Country: Germany
- State: Saxony-Anhalt
- District: Wittenberg
- Town: Coswig

Area
  - Total: 10.62 km^{2} (4.10 sq mi)
- Elevation: 115 m (377 ft)

Population (2006-12-31)
  - Total: 177
  - Density: 16.7/km^{2} (43.2/sq mi)
- Time zone: UTC+01:00 (CET)
  - Summer (DST): UTC+02:00 (CEST)
- Postal codes: 06869
- Dialling codes: 034903
- Vehicle registration: WB

Möllensdorf is a village and a former municipality in Wittenberg district in Saxony-Anhalt, Germany. Since 1 July 2009, it is part of the town Coswig.
