= Holzdorf (Jessen) =

- Ortsteil of Jessen (Elster)
- Interactive map of Holzdorf
- Location within Germany Location within Saxony-Anhalt
- Coordinates: 51°46′46″N 13°06′40″E
- Country: Germany
- State: Saxony-Anhalt
- District: Wittenberg
- Town: Jessen (Elster)
- Elevation: 77 m (253 ft)

Population (2021)
  - Total: 1,155
- Time zone: UTC+01:00 (CET)
  - Summer (DST): UTC+02:00 (CEST)
- Postal codes: 06926
- Dialling codes: 035389
- Vehicle registration: WB

Holzdorf is a village in the municipality of Jessen (Elster) in the district of Wittenberg in the German state of Saxony-Anhalt. It has 1,155 inhabitants (2021). Previously a separate municipality in the district of Kremitz, it became part of the amalgamated municipality of Jessen on 1 March 2004.

Holzdorf, with various shops and doctors' offices, is a regional center for the surrounding villages. In addition to farming, the nearby Schönewalde/Holzdorf Air Base with about 400 staff, is the main source of income of the residents. The air base itself is within the city Schönewalde in Brandenburg.

== History ==
From 1815 to 1944, Holzdorf was part of the Prussian Province of Saxony and from 1944 to 1945 of the Province of Halle-Merseburg.

After World War II, Holzdorf was incorporated into the Province (since 1947, State) of Saxony-Anhalt from 1945 to 1952 and the Bezirk Cottbus of East Germany from 1952 to 1990. Since 1990, Holzdorf has been part of Saxony-Anhalt, since 2004 as a part of Jessen.
