= Wörpen =

Municipality in Saxony-Anhalt, Germany

Coordinates: 51°56′N 12°30′E

Wörpen is a former municipality in the district of Wittenberg, Saxony-Anhalt, Germany. Since January 2008, it is part of the town Coswig.
