= Buko =

- Stadtteil of Coswig (Anhalt)
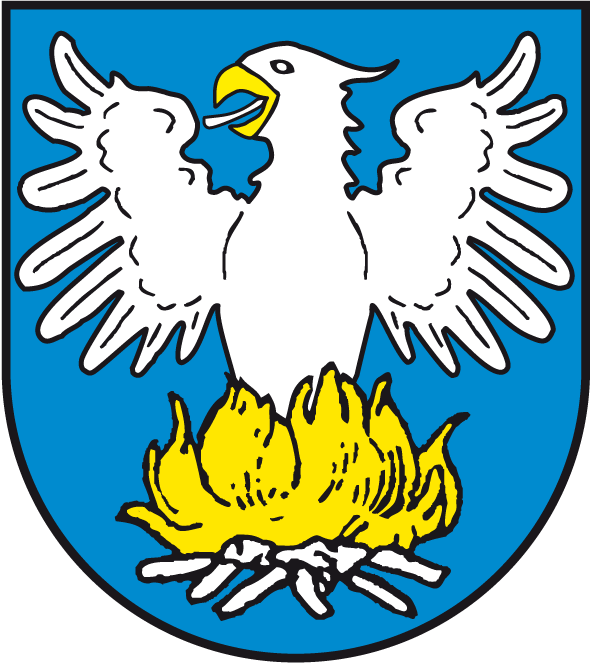
- Coat of arms
- Interactive map of Buko
- Location within Germany Location within Saxony-Anhalt
- Coordinates: 51°57′N 12°24′E
- Country: Germany
- State: Saxony-Anhalt
- District: Wittenberg
- Town: Coswig (Anhalt)

Area
  - Total: 15.82 km^{2} (6.11 sq mi)
- Elevation: 111 m (364 ft)

Population (2006-12-31)
  - Total: 181
  - Density: 11.4/km^{2} (29.6/sq mi)
- Time zone: UTC+01:00 (CET)
  - Summer (DST): UTC+02:00 (CEST)
- Postal codes: 06869
- Dialling codes: 034903
- Vehicle registration: WB

Buko is a village and a former municipality in the district of Wittenberg, Saxony-Anhalt, Germany. Since 1 January 2009, it is part of the town of Coswig (Anhalt).
