= Karl Lamprecht =

German historian (1856–1915)

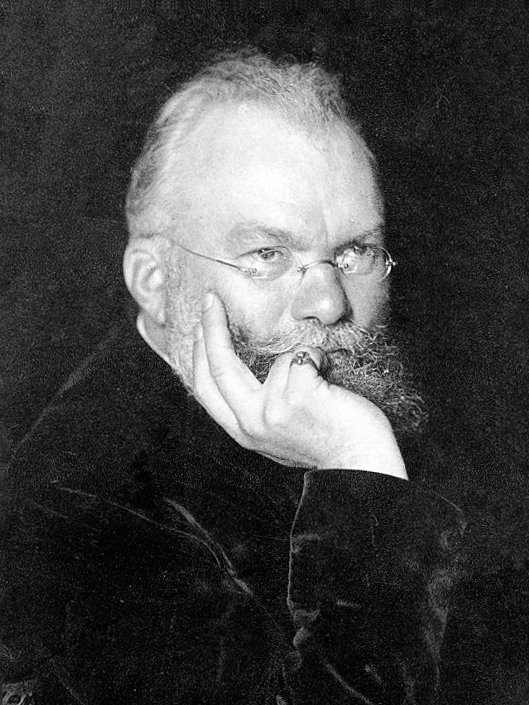
- Karl Lamprecht in 1909
- Born: 25 February 1856; Jessen, Province of Saxony, Kingdom of Prussia
- Died: 10 May 1915 (aged 59); Leipzig, German Empire
- Occupation: Historian

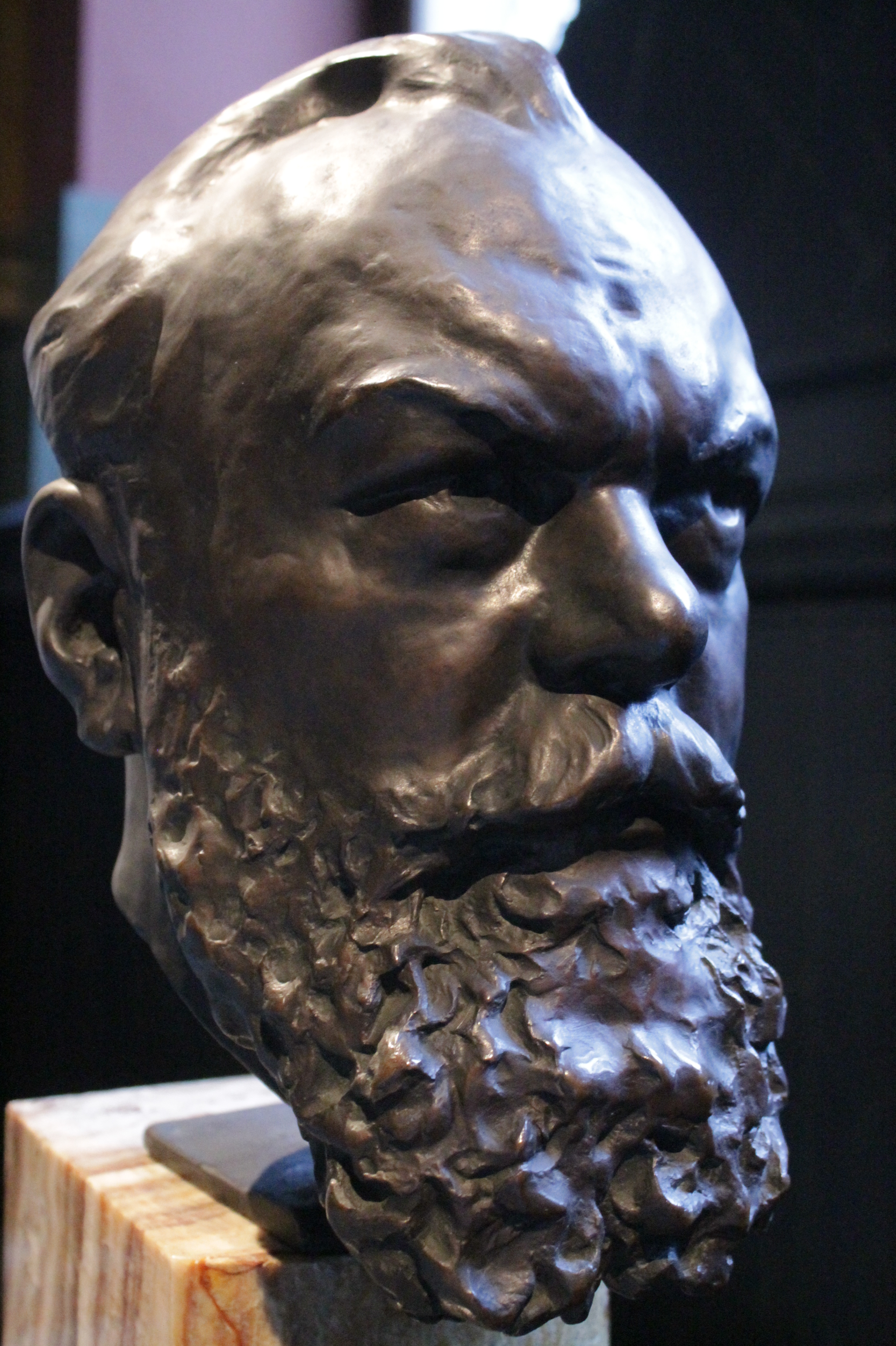
Karl Lamprecht by Max Klinger, Albertinum, Dresden

Karl Gotthard Lamprecht (25 February 1856 – 10 May 1915) was a German historian who specialized in German art and economic history.

== Biography ==
Lamprecht was born in Jessen in the Province of Saxony. As a student, he trained in history, political science, economics, and art at the University of Göttingen, Leipzig University, and the Ludwig-Maximilians-Universität München. Lamprecht taught at Marburg University and later at Leipzig University, where he founded the Institut für Kultur und Universalgeschichte center dedicated to comparative world and cultural history.

Lamprecht was employee at the successful edition project "The Chronicles of the German Cities" under the leadership of the well-known and highly reputable German historian Karl von Hegel.

Lamprecht studied German and European social and economic history, particularly of the Middle Ages. He aroused considerable controversy with his loose interdisciplinary methods and focus on broad social, environmental, and even psychological, questions in history. To him, history meant as much the revelation of sociology as of political events.

Lamprecht's ambitious Deutsche Geschichte (13 vols., 1891–1908) on the whole trajectory of German history sparked a famous Methodenstreit (methodological dispute) within Germany's academic history establishment, especially Max Weber, who habitually referred to Lamprecht as a mere dilettante. Lamprecht came under criticism from scholars of legal and constitutional history like Friedrich Meinecke and Georg von Below for his lack of methodological rigor and inattention to important political trends and ideologies. As a result, Lamprecht and his students were marginalized by German academia, and interdisciplinary social history remained something of a taboo among German historians for much of the twentieth century. However, during the years of the series' publication, his work enjoyed a wide readership among the nonacademic German community.

He was the chief exponent of the Kulturgeschichte ("History of Culture"), and believed intensely in the superiority of German culture. Shortly before his death he repudiated, with some indignation, the conception of Germany's part in World War I as having been dictated by "warlords," and avowed that in regard to it that Germany was united.

Lamprecht died in Leipzig on 10 May 1915 from what appears to have been the result of internal bleeding brought on by a perforated ulcer.

== Influence ==
According to Ernst Breisach,

Lamprecht himself stipulated psychological forces as the basic forces in all of history. But they derived from the collective psyche of every nation and not from the idiosyncratic forces of individual psyches. Historiography, p. 279

Lamprecht found a much more positive reception for his ideas and methods in France and the United States. In 1904, he was invited to give a series of lectures at Columbia University, which were translated and published in 1905 as What is History?

Lamprecht failed to convince other historians, but a mutant of the idea of a Volksseele intruded into French historiography as the concept of a period's mentality, especially as mentalité or sensibilité in Febvre's work. Breisach, p. 342–3

Lamprecht's work was a formative influence in the thinking of the French social historian Marc Bloch as well as the Annales School. One of his students was Cai Yuanpei, who later served as the chancellor of Peking University and had an enormous influence on modern Chinese thought.

== Selected bibliography ==
- Deutsches Wirtschaftsleben im Mittelalter, 3 vols., Leipzig 1885–1886 (Aalen 1969)
- Deutsche Geschichte, 12 vols. + 2 incomplete vols., Berlin 1891–1909
- Die kulturhistorische Methode, Berlin 1900
- Lamprecht, Karl (1905). What is history? Five lectures on the modern science of history. E. A. Andrews (trans.), William Edward Dodd (trans.). New York: Macmillan Co. OCLC 1169422.

== Sources ==
- Chickering, Roger. Karl Lamprecht: A German Academic Life (1856–1915), Atlantic Highlands (NJ) 1993.
- Chickering, Roger. "Young Lamprecht: An Essay in Biography and Historiography." History and Theory 28.2 (1989): 198–214 online.
- Diesener, Gerald. "Lamprecht, Karl. German cultural and social historian," in: Kelly Boyd (Ed.): Encyclopedia of Historians and Historical Writing, Vol. I, London/Chicago 1999, pp. 680–681.
- Georg G. Iggers, "The Historian Banished. Karl Lamprecht in Imperial Germany," Central European History 27 (1994), pp. 87–92.
- Rines, George Edwin, ed. (1920). "Lamprecht, Karl" . Encyclopedia Americana.
- William E. Dodd (September 1903). "Karl Lamprecht and Kulturgeschichte" . Popular Science Monthly. Vol. 63.
