= Thießen =

- Stadtteil of Coswig
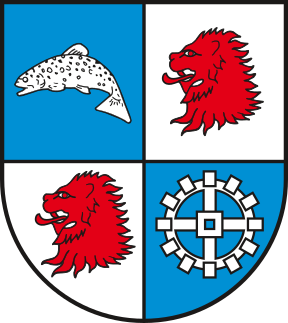
- Coat of arms
- Interactive map of Thießen
- Location within Germany Location within Saxony-Anhalt
- Coordinates: 51°57′N 12°18′E
- Country: Germany
- State: Saxony-Anhalt
- District: Wittenberg
- Town: Coswig

Area
  - Total: 21.53 km^{2} (8.31 sq mi)
- Elevation: 86 m (282 ft)

Population (2009-12-31)
  - Total: 676
  - Density: 31.4/km^{2} (81.3/sq mi)
- Time zone: UTC+01:00 (CET)
  - Summer (DST): UTC+02:00 (CEST)
- Postal codes: 06862
- Dialling codes: 034907
- Vehicle registration: WB

Thießen (German pronunciation: [ˈtiːsn̩]) is a village and a former municipality in the district of Wittenberg, Saxony-Anhalt, Germany. Since 1 September 2010, it is part of the town Coswig.

== Copper hammer mill ==
Thießen copper hammer mill (Kupferhammer Thießen) is an industrial monument and the only copper hammer mill in Saxony-Anhalt. It lies in a park, roughly 1 hectare in area. The Rossel stream, which flows through the park, is impounded above the mill into a hammer pond, part of which drains freely, but part of which is used to drive the water wheels of the mill.
