= Schützberg =

- Ortsteil of Jessen (Elster)
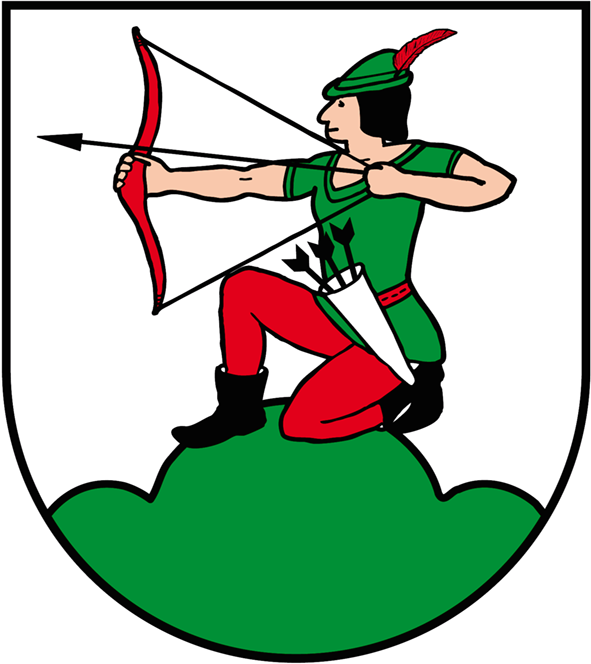
- Coat of arms
- Interactive map of Schützberg
- Location within Germany Location within Saxony-Anhalt
- Coordinates: 51°47′27″N 12°49′43″E
- Country: Germany
- State: Saxony-Anhalt
- District: Wittenberg
- Town: Jessen (Elster)

Area
  - Total: 11.03 km^{2} (4.26 sq mi)
- Elevation: 73 m (240 ft)

Population (2021)
  - Total: 131
  - Density: 11.9/km^{2} (30.8/sq mi)
- Time zone: UTC+01:00 (CET)
  - Summer (DST): UTC+02:00 (CEST)
- Postal codes: 06917
- Dialling codes: 035388
- Vehicle registration: WB

Schützberg is a village and a former municipality in Wittenberg district in Saxony-Anhalt, Germany. Since 1 January 2011, it is part of the town Jessen (Elster).

== Geography ==
Schützberg lies about 12 km west of Jessen on the Elbe.

== History ==
From 1815 to 1944, Schützberg was part of the Prussian Province of Saxony and from 1944 to 1945 of the Province of Halle-Merseburg.

After World War II, Schützberg was incorporated into the Province (since 1947, State) of Saxony-Anhalt from 1945 to 1952 and the Bezirk Cottbus of East Germany from 1952 to 1990. Since 1990, Schützberg has been part of Saxony-Anhalt, since 2011 as a part of Jessen.

== Economy and transportation ==
Federal Highway (Bundesstraße) B 187 between Wittenberg and Jessen is about 12 km to the east.
