= Coswig Ferry =

Cable ferry in Saxony-Anhalt, Germany

Coordinates: 51.876862°N 12.45208°E

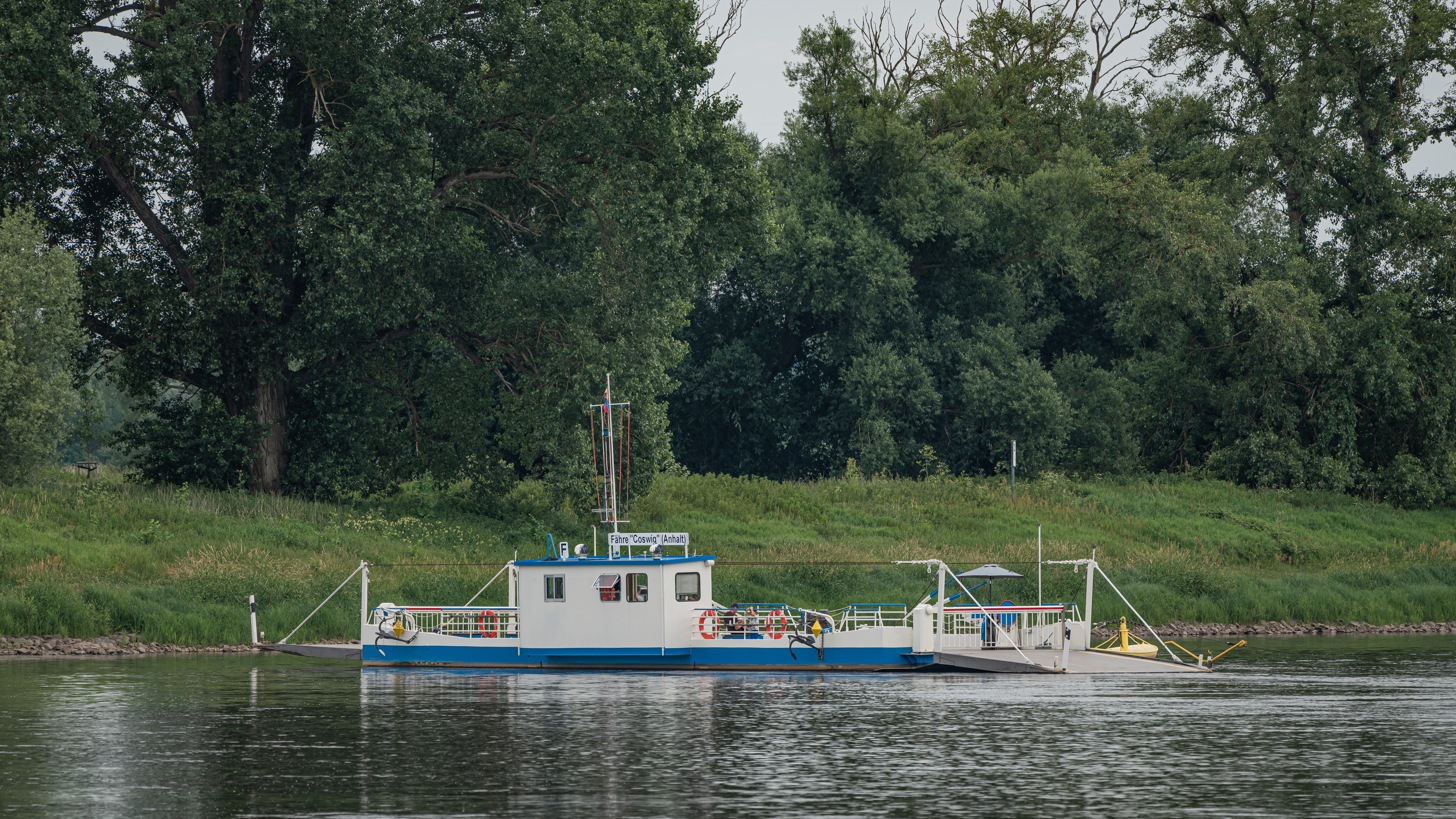
The Coswig Ferry

The Coswig Ferry, also known as the Wörlitz Coswig Ferry, is a cable ferry across the Elbe river between Coswig and Wörlitz in Saxony-Anhalt, Germany. The ferry is owned by the municipality of Coswig.

The ferry crosses a distance of about 125 metres (410 ft), taking about 5 minutes. Technically, the ferry is a reaction ferry, which is propelled by the current of the water. The ferry is attached to a floating cable which is anchored firmly in the riverbed upstream of the ferry. To operate the ferry, it is angled into the current, causing the force of the current to swing the ferry across the river on the cable.

A ferry has operated at the site since at least 1566. The reaction principle of operation was first introduced in 1863, and has continued ever since. The current ferry boat dates back to 1934, although it has been modernised several times since then.
