= Klöden =

- Ortsteil of Jessen (Elster)
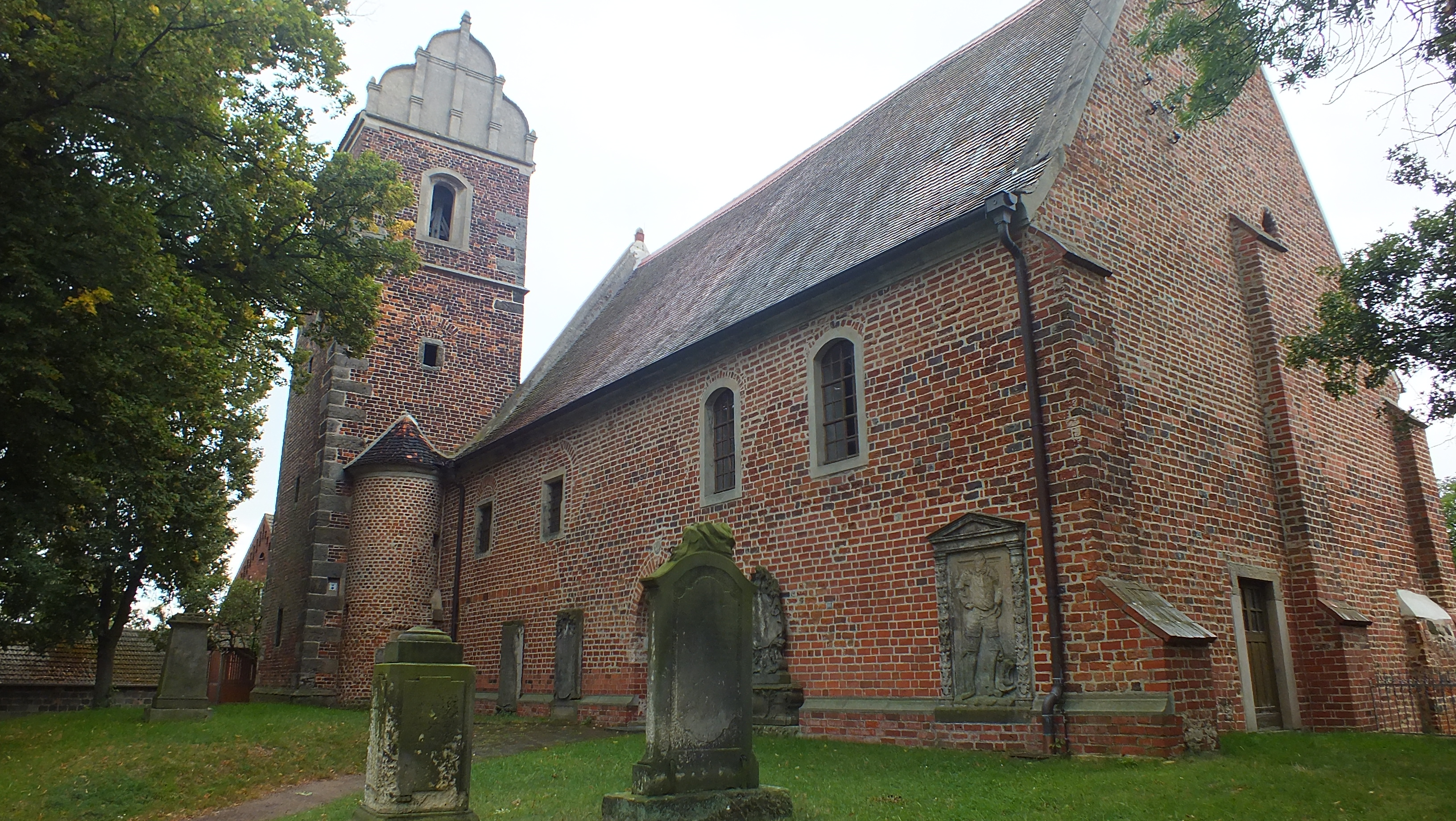

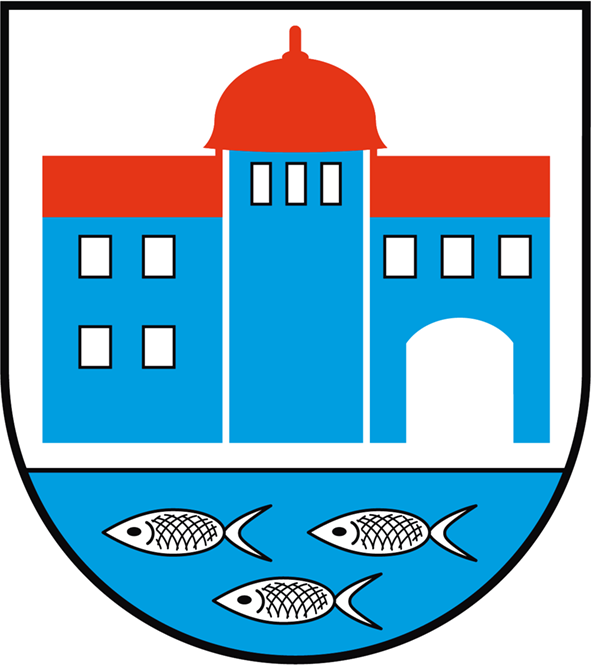
- Coat of arms
- Interactive map of Klöden
- Location within Germany Location within Saxony-Anhalt
- Coordinates: 51°46′N 12°50′E
- Country: Germany
- State: Saxony-Anhalt
- District: Wittenberg
- Town: Jessen (Elster)

Area
  - Total: 14.94 km^{2} (5.77 sq mi)
- Elevation: 73 m (240 ft)

Population (2021)
  - Total: 515
  - Density: 34.5/km^{2} (89.3/sq mi)
- Time zone: UTC+01:00 (CET)
  - Summer (DST): UTC+02:00 (CEST)
- Postal codes: 06917
- Dialling codes: 035388
- Vehicle registration: WB
- Website: www.kloeden.de

Klöden is a village and a former municipality in Wittenberg district in Saxony-Anhalt, Germany. Since 1 January 2011, it is part of the town Jessen (Elster).

== Geography ==
Klöden lies on the Elbe about 12 km southwest of Jessen and in eastern Saxony-Anhalt.

Klöden lies in the middle of the Elbaue, a kind of natural polder, and one of the biggest woodland and meadowland areas in the region. Much of it is still wild, harbouring a great many wild animals such as roe deer, wild boar, fallow deer, Elbe beavers, and many others. The plant life is also quite diverse.

== History ==
Klöden's history is the subject of very divergent points of view. This even goes for the origin of the community's name, as well as for just when Klöden had its first documentary mention. The most up-to-date research says that the name is of Slavic origin. In 1935, the name's spelling was changed from "Clöden" to "Klöden".

The earliest document that is available was drawn up on 12 April 965, but it constitutes a clever forgery (ie it is authentically mediaeval, but its original purpose was fraudulent). It contains, among the 17 placenames that it mentions, one called "Clotna".

What follows is a summary of what it says:

"On 12 April 965, Kaiser Otto I of Nordhausen granted from Saint John's Monastery to Magdeburg the honey tithe from the Slavic province of Nizzi lying in his faithful Hodo's county."

The document, originally written in Latin, nowadays hangs in the vicarage in Klöden. The document's legal validity only bears on the granting of honey tithes at the aforesaid point in time.

The mention of the place Clotna in the year 965 allows the conclusion that Klöden is more than 1000 years old, as the document is witness to a fraudulent acquisition of a honey tithe, not to a founding date.

Source: Extracts from the Klödener Chronik by Mr. Schepeler Kurt.

From 1815 to 1944, Klöden was part of the Prussian Province of Saxony and from 1944 to 1945 of the Province of Halle-Merseburg.

After World War II, Klöden was incorporated into the Province (since 1947, State) of Saxony-Anhalt from 1945 to 1952 and the Bezirk Cottbus of East Germany from 1952 to 1990. Since 1990, Klöden has been part of Saxony-Anhalt, since 2011 as a part of Jessen.

== Economy and transportation ==
Klöden is connected to Federal Highway (Bundesstraße) B 187, which lies 12 km north of the community, and joins Jessen and Wittenberg.

There is, however, no railway connection. Jessen station is not far away, though, and Klöden may be reached from there by bus.

The Elbradweg R2 bicycle trail also serves Klöden.
