= Köselitz =

- Stadtteil of Coswig (Anhalt)
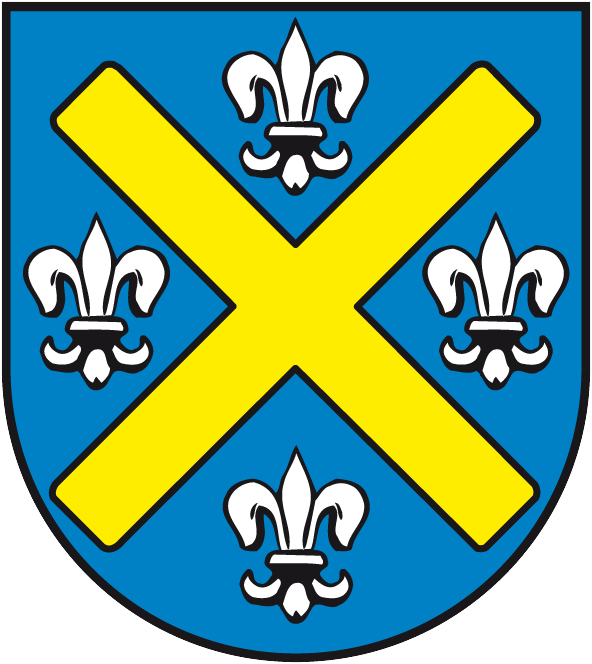
- Coat of arms
- Interactive map of Köselitz
- Location within Germany Location within Saxony-Anhalt
- Coordinates: 51°58′N 12°28′E
- Country: Germany
- State: Saxony-Anhalt
- District: Wittenberg
- Town: Coswig (Anhalt)

Area
  - Total: 19.07 km^{2} (7.36 sq mi)
- Elevation: 122 m (400 ft)

Population (2006-12-31)
  - Total: 195
  - Density: 10.2/km^{2} (26.5/sq mi)
- Time zone: UTC+01:00 (CET)
  - Summer (DST): UTC+02:00 (CEST)
- Postal codes: 06869
- Dialling codes: 034923
- Vehicle registration: WB

Köselitz is a village and a former municipality in the district of Wittenberg, Saxony-Anhalt, Germany. Since January 1, 2009, it has been part of the town Coswig (Anhalt).
