= Zahna-Elster =

- Town
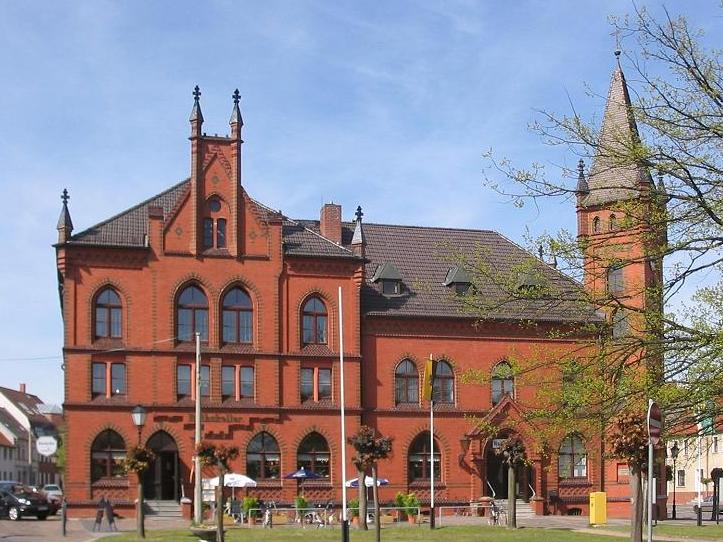
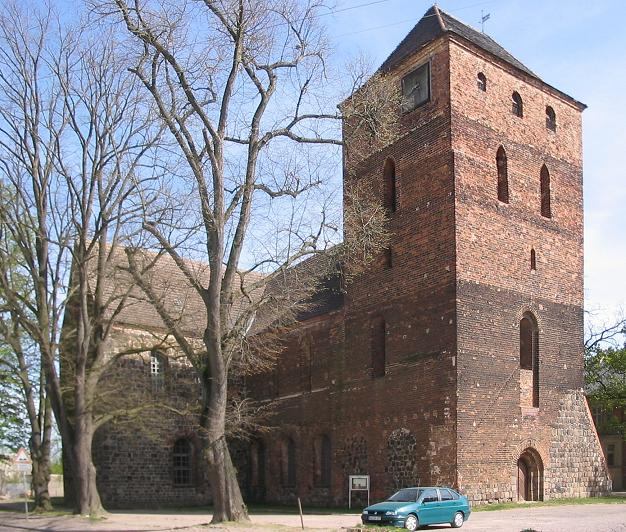
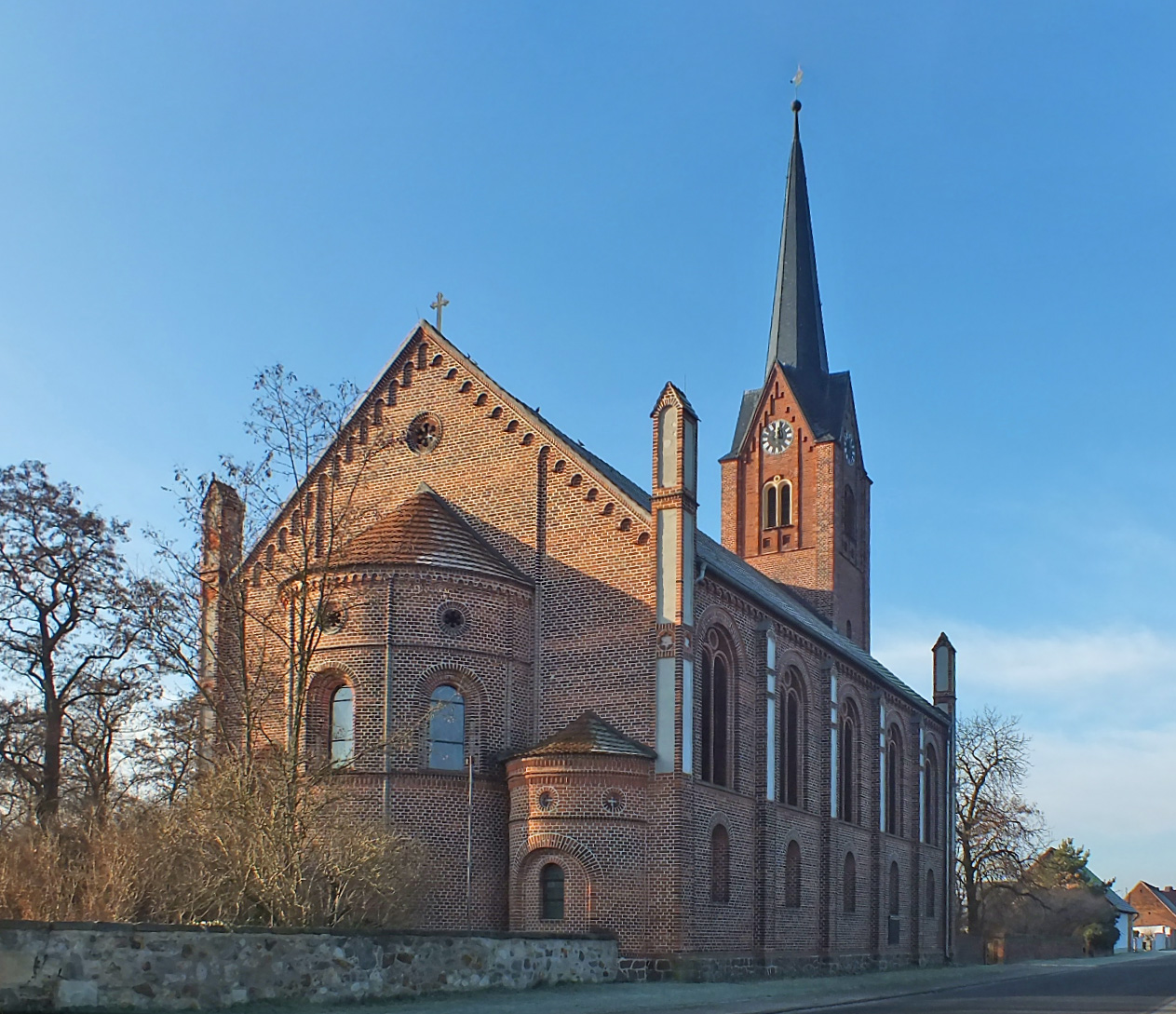
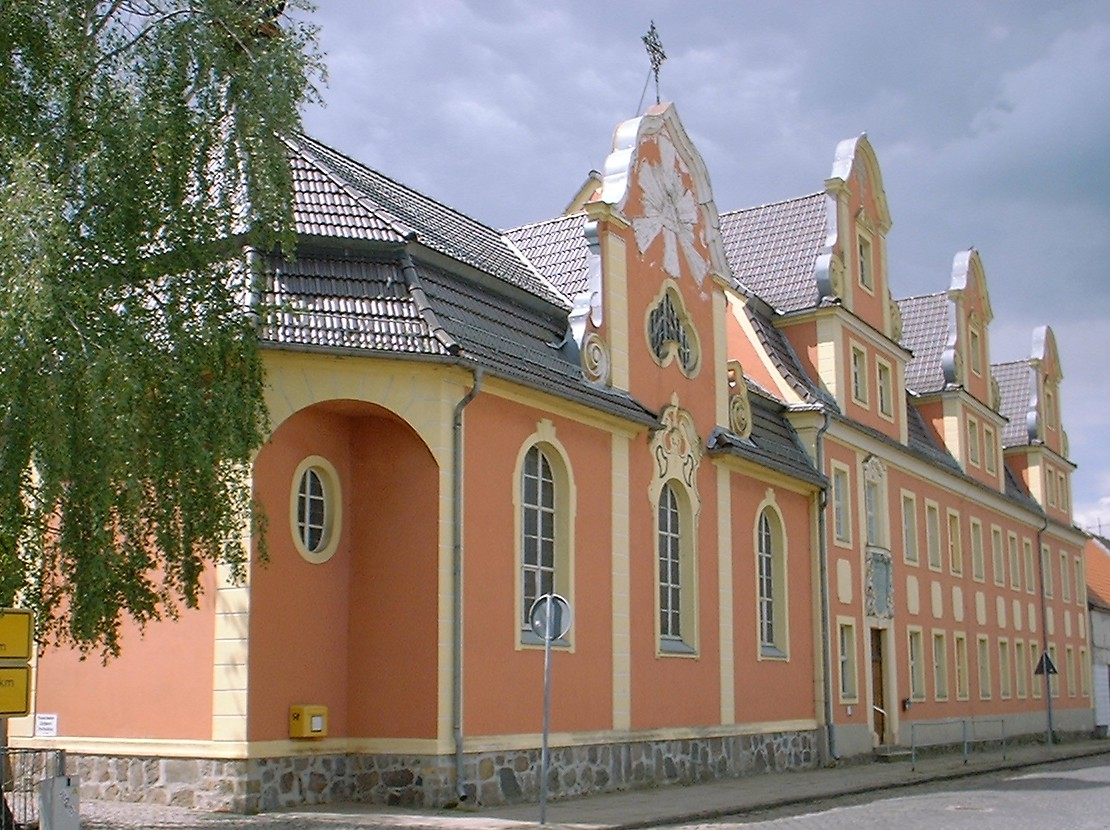
- Town hall Zahna St. Maries church Zahna Elster church Zahna Stift

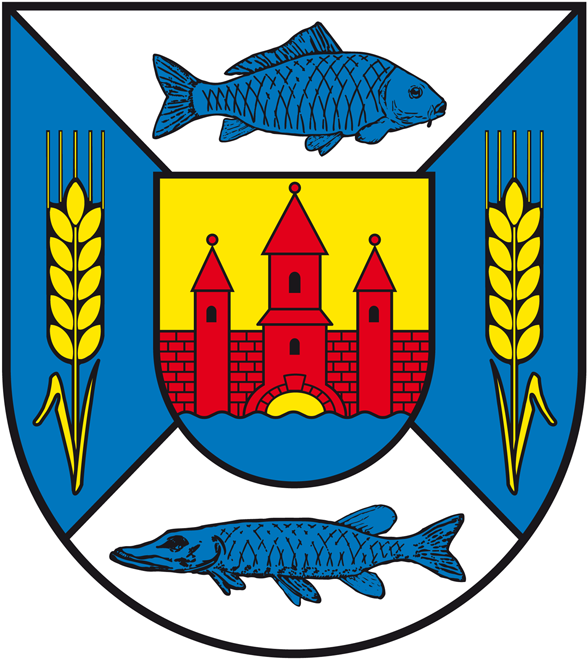
- Coat of arms

- Location of Zahna-Elster within Wittenberg district
- Interactive map of Zahna-Elster
- Location within Germany Location within Saxony-Anhalt
- Coordinates: 51°47′57″N 12°24′25″E
- Country: Germany
- State: Saxony-Anhalt
- District: Wittenberg

Government
  - Mayor (2017–24): Peter Müller

Area
  - Total: 148.58 km^{2} (57.37 sq mi)
- Elevation: 120 m (390 ft)

Population (2025-12-31)
  - Total: 8,910
  - Density: 60.0/km^{2} (155/sq mi)
- Time zone: UTC+01:00 (CET)
  - Summer (DST): UTC+02:00 (CEST)
- Postal codes: 06895
- Dialling codes: 034924
- Vehicle registration: WB
- Website: www.stadt-zahna-elster.de

Zahna-Elster (German pronunciation: [ˈtsaːna ˈʔɛlstɐ]) is a town in the district of Wittenberg, in Saxony-Anhalt, Germany. It was formed on 1 January 2011 by the merger of the former municipalities Zahna, Dietrichsdorf, Elster (Elbe), Gadegast, Leetza, Listerfehrda, Mühlanger, Zemnick and Zörnigall. On 29 May 2013 the incorporation of Mühlanger was reverted as a result of a decision of the Constitutional court of Saxony-Anhalt, but it was incorporated again on 1 January 2014. These former municipalities are now the 9 Ortschaften (municipal divisions) of the town Zahna-Elster.
