= Coswig, Saxony-Anhalt =

Coswig
- Town
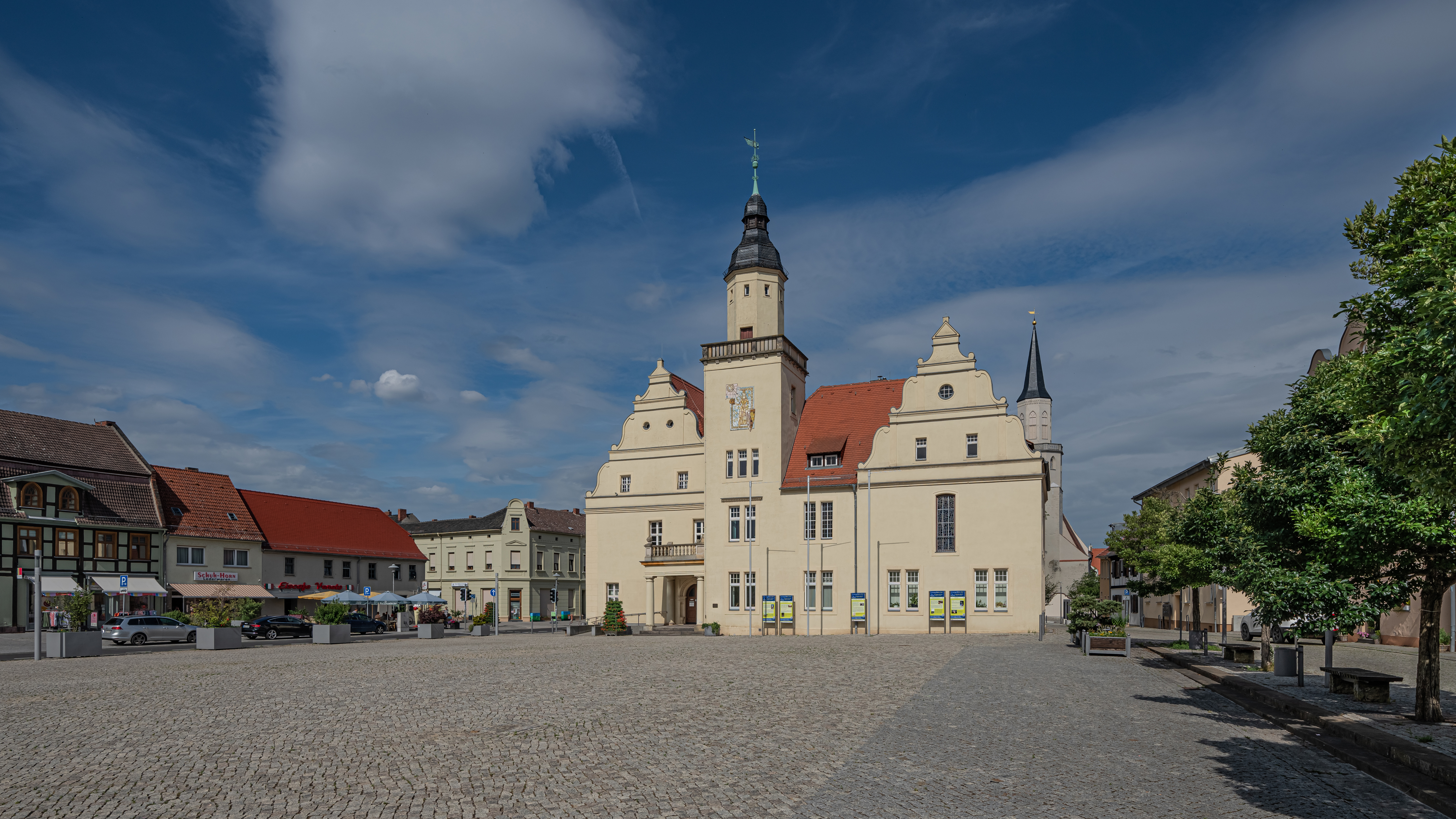
- Market square and town hall

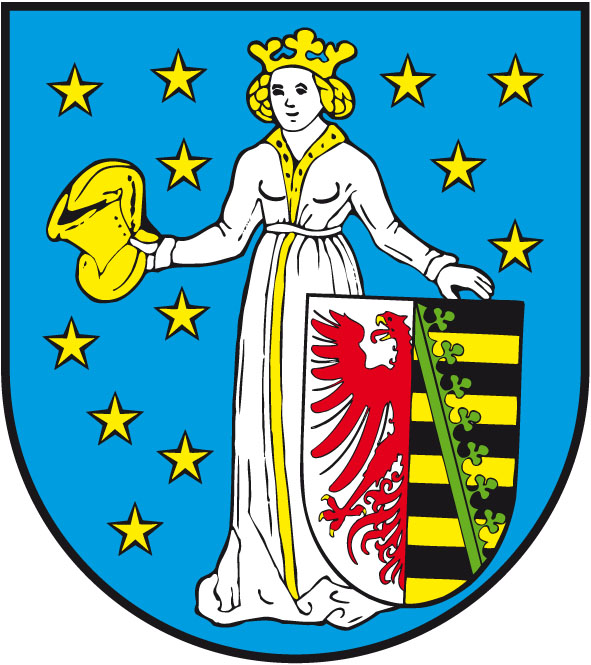
- Coat of arms

- Location of Coswig within Wittenberg district
- Interactive map of Coswig
- Location within Germany Location within Saxony-Anhalt
- Coordinates: 51°53′3″N 12°27′25″E
- Country: Germany
- State: Saxony-Anhalt
- District: Wittenberg

Government
  - Mayor (2024–31): André Saage (SPD)

Area
  - Total: 295.75 km^{2} (114.19 sq mi)
- Elevation: 83 m (272 ft)

Population (2025-12-31)
  - Total: 11,007
  - Density: 37.217/km^{2} (96.392/sq mi)
- Time zone: UTC+01:00 (CET)
  - Summer (DST): UTC+02:00 (CEST)
- Postal codes: 06869
- Dialling codes: 034903
- Vehicle registration: WB
- Website: www.coswigonline.de

Coswig (German pronunciation: [ˈkɔsvɪç]) is a town in the district of Wittenberg of Saxony-Anhalt, in eastern Germany. It is situated on the right bank of the Elbe, approx. 12 km west of Wittenberg, and 15 km east of Dessau.

== History ==
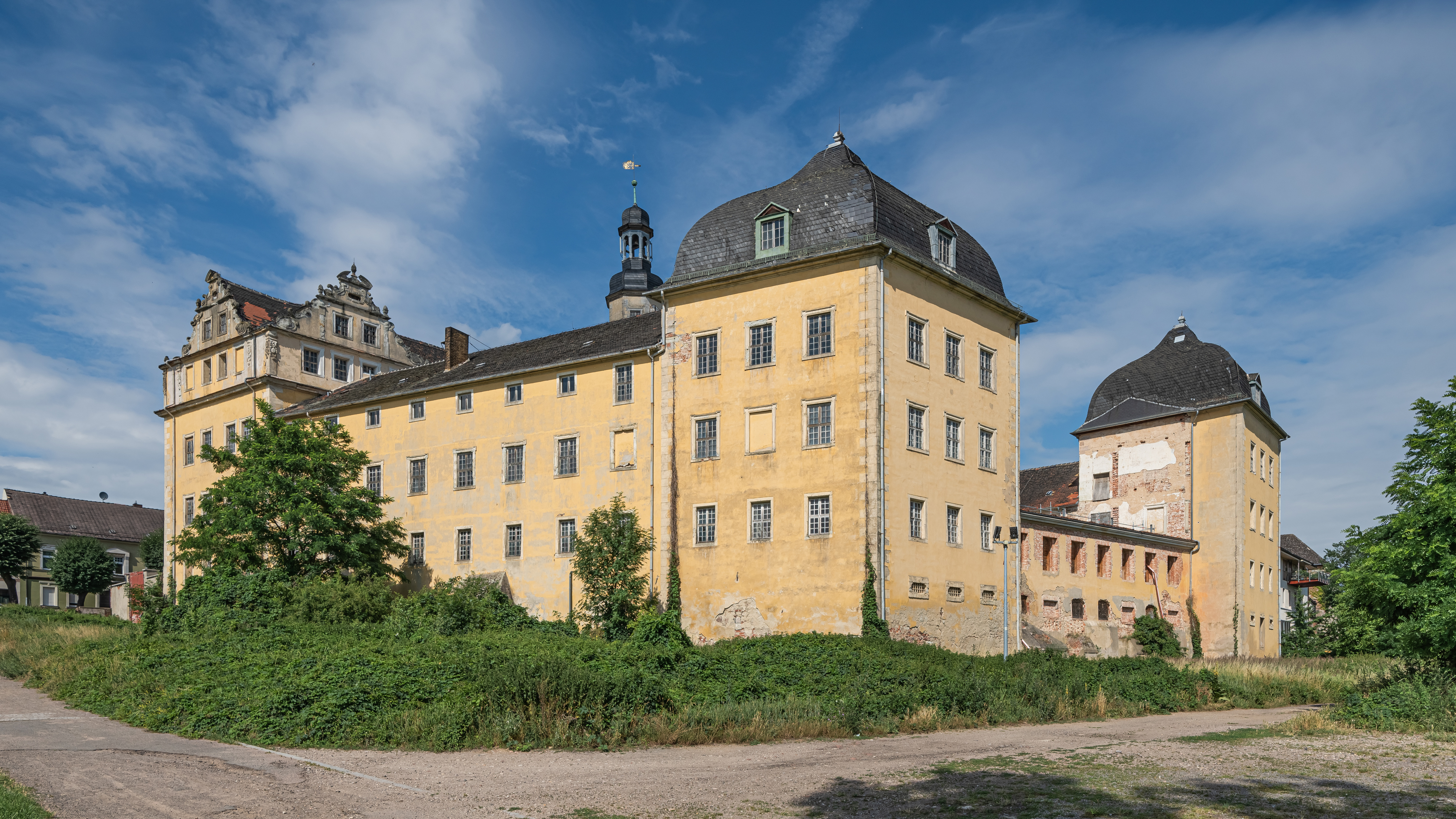
Castle

The Castle of Coswig was mentioned first in 1187. There is no evidence for slav settlements before this date. In 1215 Coswig was attested as an "Oppidium". During this time it was one of the most important cities North of the river Elbe. In the 16th century Coswig was already connected to a drinking water pipe from Wörpen. Weaving, pottery and farming played the most important role in economics. The city was nearly completely destroyed by Spanish troops during the Schmalkaldic War. The city belonged to the Principality of Anhalt-Zerbst from 1603 to 1793, to Anhalt-Bernburg until 1863, then to the Duchy of Anhalt until 1918.

Coswig was the location of a Nazi-operated prison with several forced labour subcamps in the region.

Until 1952, Coswig (Anhalt) belonged to the Free State of Anhalt, later the province of Saxony-Anhalt, from 1952 to the Halle district and from 1990 to the state of Saxony-Anhalt.

In 1987 the city celebrated its 800th-year of existence.

== Geography ==
The town Coswig consists of Coswig proper and the following Ortschaften or municipal divisions:

- Bräsen
- Buko
- Cobbelsdorf
- Düben
- Hundeluft
- Jeber-Bergfrieden
- Klieken
- Köselitz
- Möllensdorf
- Ragösen
- Senst
- Serno
- Stackelitz
- Thießen
- Wörpen
- Zieko

== Sights ==
- Coswig Castle
- Nicolaikirche (church)
- New Apostolic Church
- Coswig Ferry, a reaction ferry across the Elbe to Wörlitz
- Bismarck Tower
- Amtshaus and Townhall

== Politics ==
Turnout at the last election on 13 June 2004, was 43,6%.

Town Council: 20 seat to the following parties:

- 7 seats - CDU
- 4 seats - Linkspartei.PDS
- 3 seats - SPD
- 3 seats - Bürgerblock
- 2 seats - FWG
- 1 seats - FDP

== Twin town ==
- (Germany) Stadtallendorf, Hesse, since 1993

== Sons of the city ==
- Franz Hübner (1840–1914), missionary and bishop of the New Apostolic Church
- Hermann Cohen (1842–1918), philosopher, founder of the Marburger Schule
- Paul Mahlo (1883–1971), mathematician
- Manfred Kuschmann (1950–2002), long-distance athlete, European champion in 10,000 metres 1974

== People associated with Coswig ==
- Caroline Bardua (1781–1864), painter, one of the first bourgeois women who could build up an existence as a free-lance artist, worked in Coswig Castle
- Heinrich Berger (1844–1929), military musician, conductor and composer
