= Jessen (Elster) =

- Town
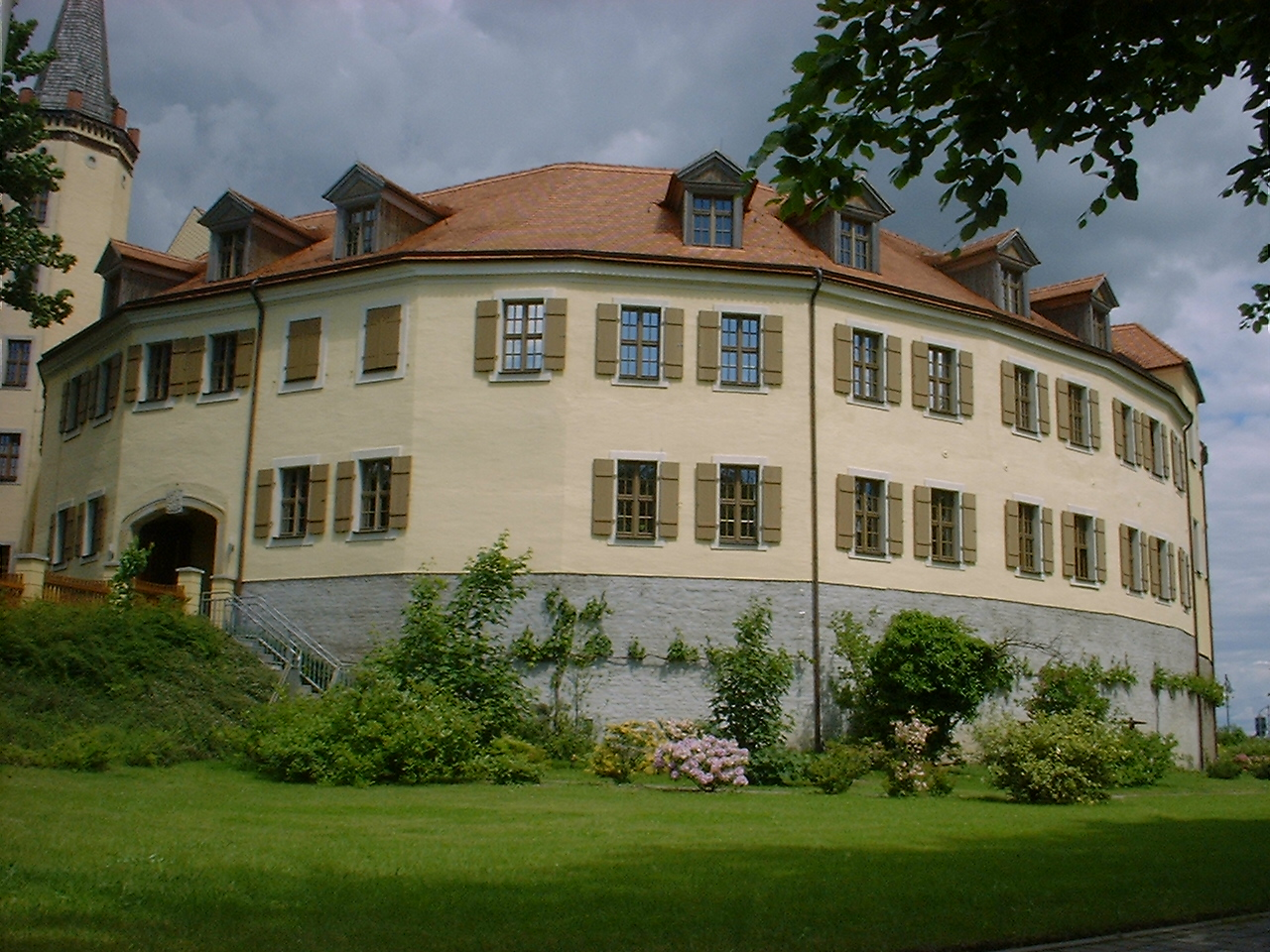

- Coat of arms

- Location of Jessen within Wittenberg district
- Interactive map of Jessen
- Location within Germany Location within Saxony-Anhalt
- Coordinates: 51°47′30″N 12°57′20″E
- Country: Germany
- State: Saxony-Anhalt
- District: Wittenberg

Government
  - Mayor (2021–28): Michael Jahn

Area
  - Total: 352.12 km^{2} (135.95 sq mi)
- Elevation: 72 m (236 ft)

Population (2025-12-31)
  - Total: 13,538
  - Density: 38.447/km^{2} (99.578/sq mi)
- Time zone: UTC+01:00 (CET)
  - Summer (DST): UTC+02:00 (CEST)
- Postal codes: 06917, 06918, 06926, 06928
- Dialling codes: 03537, 035387, 035389
- Vehicle registration: WB, GHC, JE
- Website: www.jessen.de

Jessen (German pronunciation: [ˈjɛsn̩]) is a municipality on the Black Elster river and lies in the eastern part of Saxony-Anhalt in the district of Wittenberg.

== Geography ==
Jessen is an amalgamated municipality, and has the following 44 subdivisions (Ortsteile):

- Arnsdorf
- Battin
- Buschkuhnsdorf
- Dixförda
- Düßnitz
- Gentha
- Gerbisbach
- Glücksburg
- Gorsdorf
- Grabo
- Großkorga
- Hemsendorf
- Holzdorf
- Jessen (Elster)
- Kleindröben
- Kleinkorga
- Klöden
- Klossa
- Kremitz
- Leipa
- Linda
- Lindwerder
- Lüttchenseyda
- Mark Friedersdorf
- Mark Zwuschen
- Mauken
- Mellnitz
- Mönchenhöfe
- Morxdorf
- Mügeln
- Naundorf
- Neuerstadt
- Rade
- Rehain
- Reicho
- Rettig
- Ruhlsdorf
- Schadewalde
- Schöneicho
- Schützberg
- Schweinitz
- Seyda
- Steinsdorf
- Zwuschen

== History ==
The first documentary evidence of Jessen's existence dates to 1217. On the night of 20 to 21 September 1729, much of the town was destroyed in a fire. After belonging to Saxony for centuries, Jessen became Prussian in 1815.

From 1815 to 1844, Jessen was part of the Prussian Province of Saxony and from 1944 to 1945 of the Province of Halle-Merseburg.

In 1945, it became part of the Province (since 1947, State) of Saxony-Anhalt. In 1952, owing to East German administrative reforms, Jessen became a district capital in Bezirk Cottbus. In 1990, Jessen once again became part of the newly-refounded state of Saxony-Anhalt. In 1992 came the amalgamation of the communities of Grabo, Gorsdorf-Hemsendorf, Lindwerder and Großkorga, and in 1993, Schweinitz, Gerbisbach, Klossa, Schöneicho, Steinsdorf and Dixförda. With the district reform in 1994, Jessen became part of Wittenberg district, as well as having a further three communities melded with it, namely Battin, Düßnitz and Kleindröben-Mauken. In 1999 came further amalgamations: Arnsdorf, Leipa and Ruhlsdorf mit Rehain. On 1 March 2004 came a further 12, among them Seyda, Holzdorf and Linda (Elster). Some of these formerly independent communities themselves each consisted of more than one centre, and so Jessen now has a total of 47 Stadtteile (constituent communities).

== Economy and infrastructure ==
Established businesses are mostly small and mid-sized concerns in metalworking, building, dairy processing and drink production. There are also, however, bigger enterprises in agriculture.

== Culture and Sightseeing ==
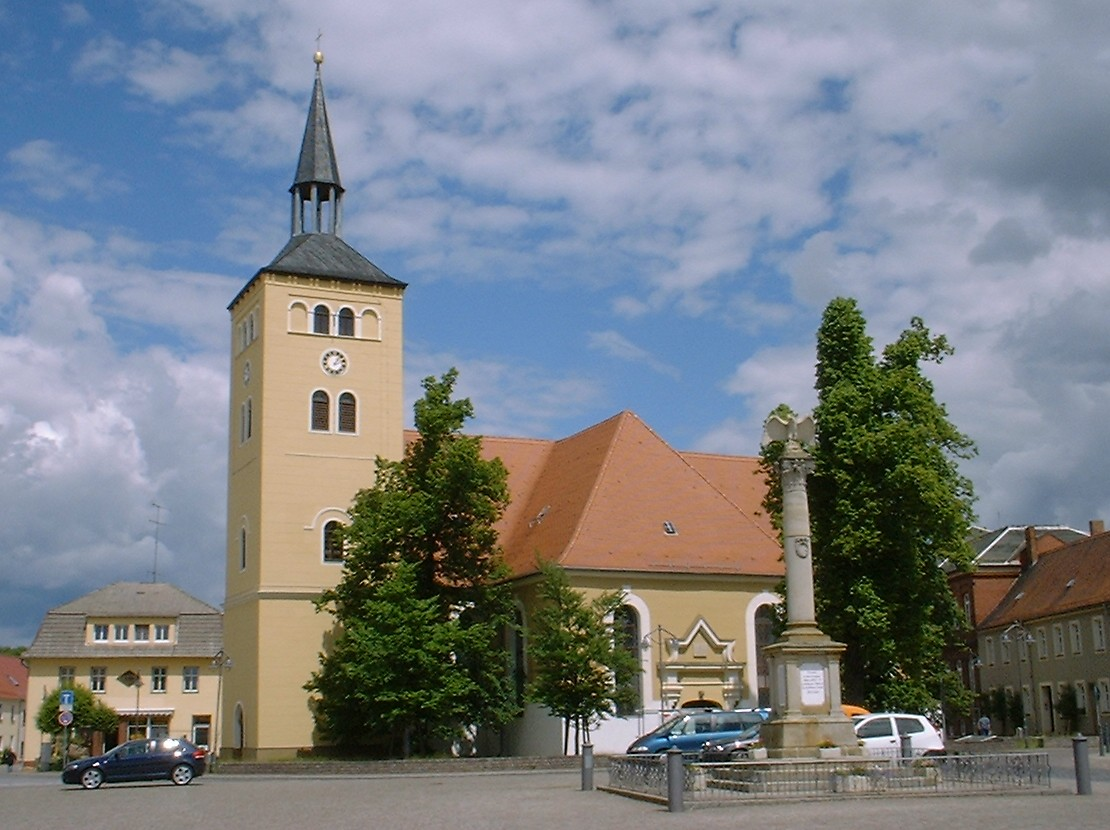
Church

- Historic marketplace in Jessen
- Parish church of St. Nicolai in Jessen
- Schloss Jessen (stately home), since 1999 town council seat
- Parish church of St. Marien in Schweinitz
- Amtshaus in Schweinitz
- Gorsdorf village church
- Kleindröben village church
- Pretzsch-Mauken reaction ferry

== Personalities ==
- Karl Lamprecht (25 February 1856 – 10 May 1915 in Leipzig), was Professor of History at the University of Leipzig, who is known today mainly for his rôle in the Methodenstreit.
- Herbert Kaiser (16 March 1916 – 5 December 2003), a pilot in the Luftwaffe during World War II
- Manfred Schüler (1932–2025), an economist and politician

== Sundry ==
The town is Germany's twelfth-largest municipality by land area, and is thereby about 3 km^{2} bigger than Munich.
