= Wittenberg (district) =

Coordinates: 51°48′N 12°41′E

- District
- Flag Coat of arms
- Country: Germany
- State: Saxony-Anhalt
- Capital: Wittenberg

Government
  - District admin.: Christian Tylsch (CDU)

Area
  - Total: 1,933.3 km^{2} (746.5 sq mi)

Population (31 December 2022)
  - Total: 123,888
  - Density: 64/km^{2} (170/sq mi)
- Time zone: UTC+01:00 (CET)
  - Summer (DST): UTC+02:00 (CEST)
- Vehicle registration: WB, GHC, JE
- Website: landkreis-wittenberg.de

Wittenberg is a district (German: Kreis) in the east of Saxony-Anhalt, Germany. Neighboring districts are (from west clockwise) Anhalt-Bitterfeld, the district-free city of Dessau-Roßlau, the districts of Potsdam-Mittelmark, Teltow-Fläming and Elbe-Elster in Brandenburg, and the district of Nordsachsen in Saxony. The capital and largest city is Wittenberg, famous for its association with the influential religious reformer Martin Luther and containing a UNESCO World Heritage Site.

== History ==
In 1994, the district was merged with the district of Jessen and a small part of the district of Gräfenhainichen. In 2007, 27 municipalities from the former district Anhalt-Zerbst were added to the district of Wittenberg.

== Geography ==
The area of the district is 1,933.3 km^{2} (746.5 sq mi). The main rivers in the district are the Elbe and its tributary, the Schwarze Elster.

== Coat of arms ==
The coat of arms shows two swords, which is the symbol of a field marshal in the Holy Roman Empire. This title was bestowed upon the counts of Saxony, who therefore added the symbol to their coat of arms. The center of the principality of Saxony was located in the area now covered by the district.

== Towns and municipalities ==
Clickable map of towns and municipalities in the district

The district of Wittenberg consists of the following towns:

- Annaburg
- Bad Schmiedeberg
- Coswig
- Gräfenhainichen
- Jessen (Elster)
- Kemberg
- Oranienbaum-Wörlitz
- Wittenberg
- Zahna-Elster

After the resolution of 6 October 2005, as part of municipal reform, the (then) 27 towns and municipalities of the former Verwaltungsgemeinschaften of Coswig and Wörlitzer Winkel, formerly in the Anhalt-Zerbst district, were assigned to Wittenberg district on 1 July 2007.

== Sights ==
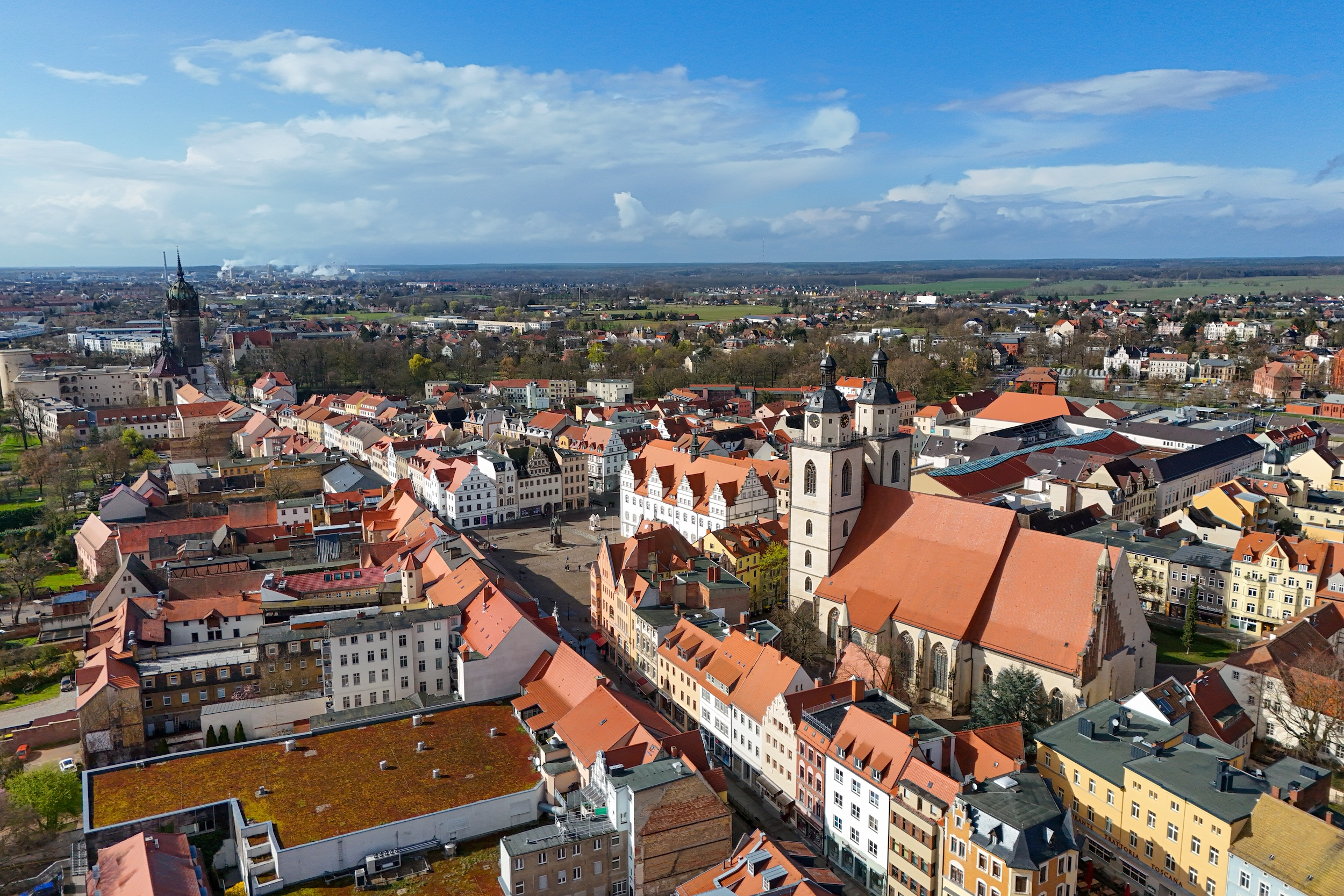
Wittenberg old town in 2024

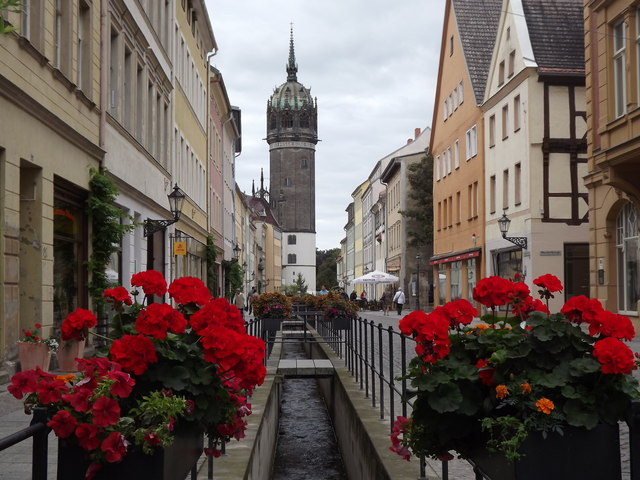
Wittenberg old town with All Saints' Church

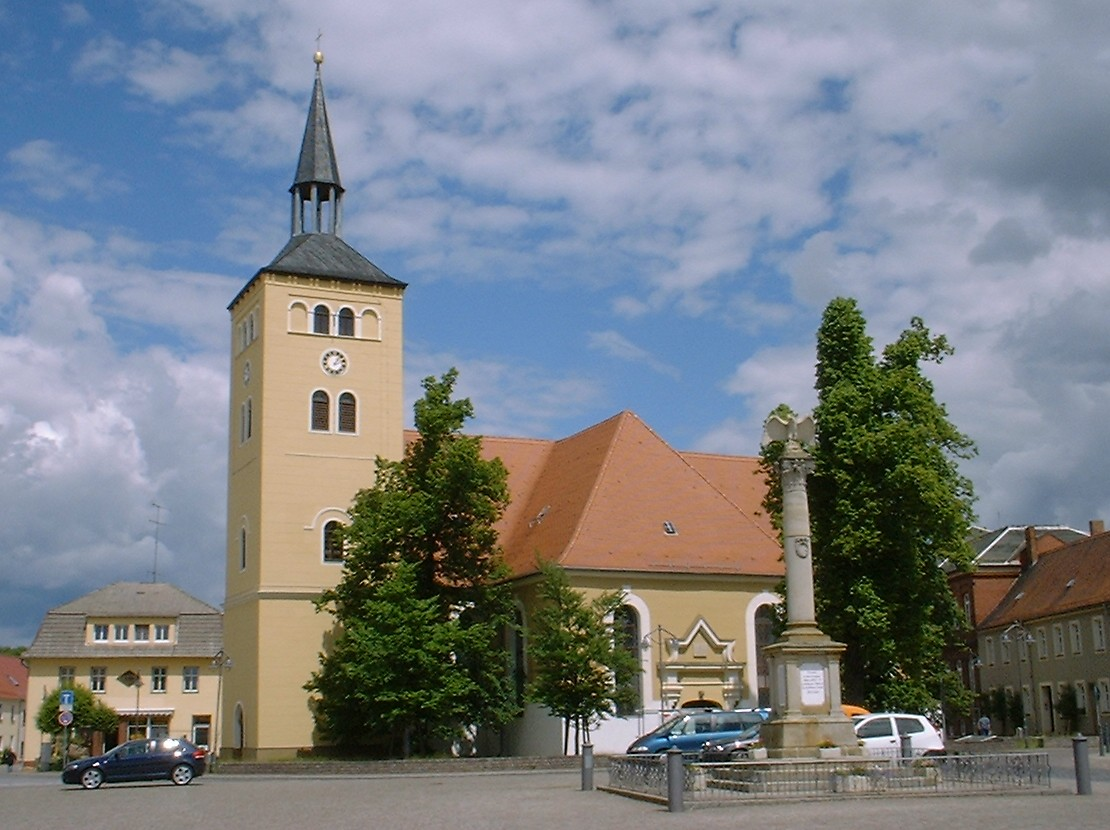
Jessen market square

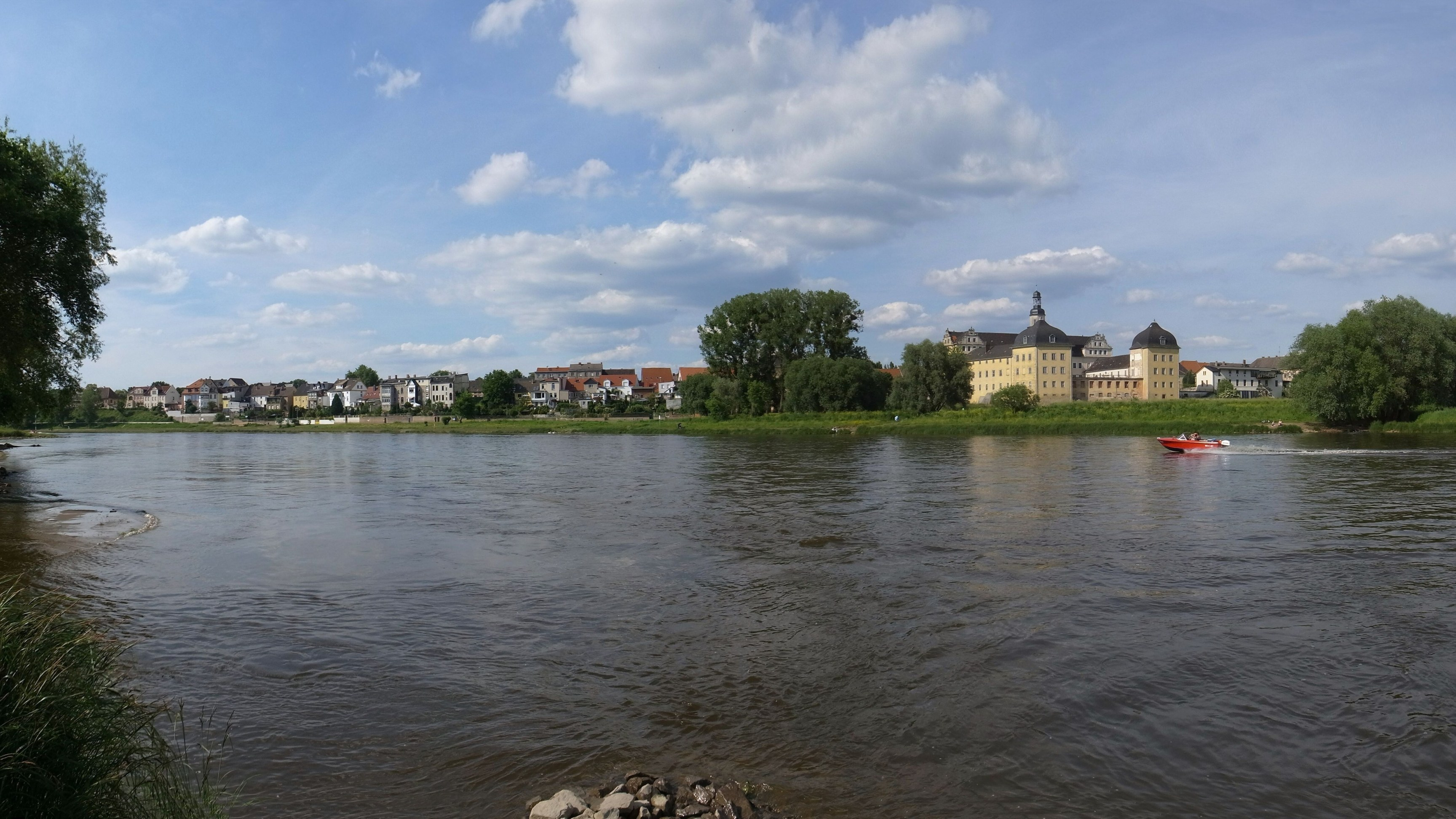
Coswig view river Elbe

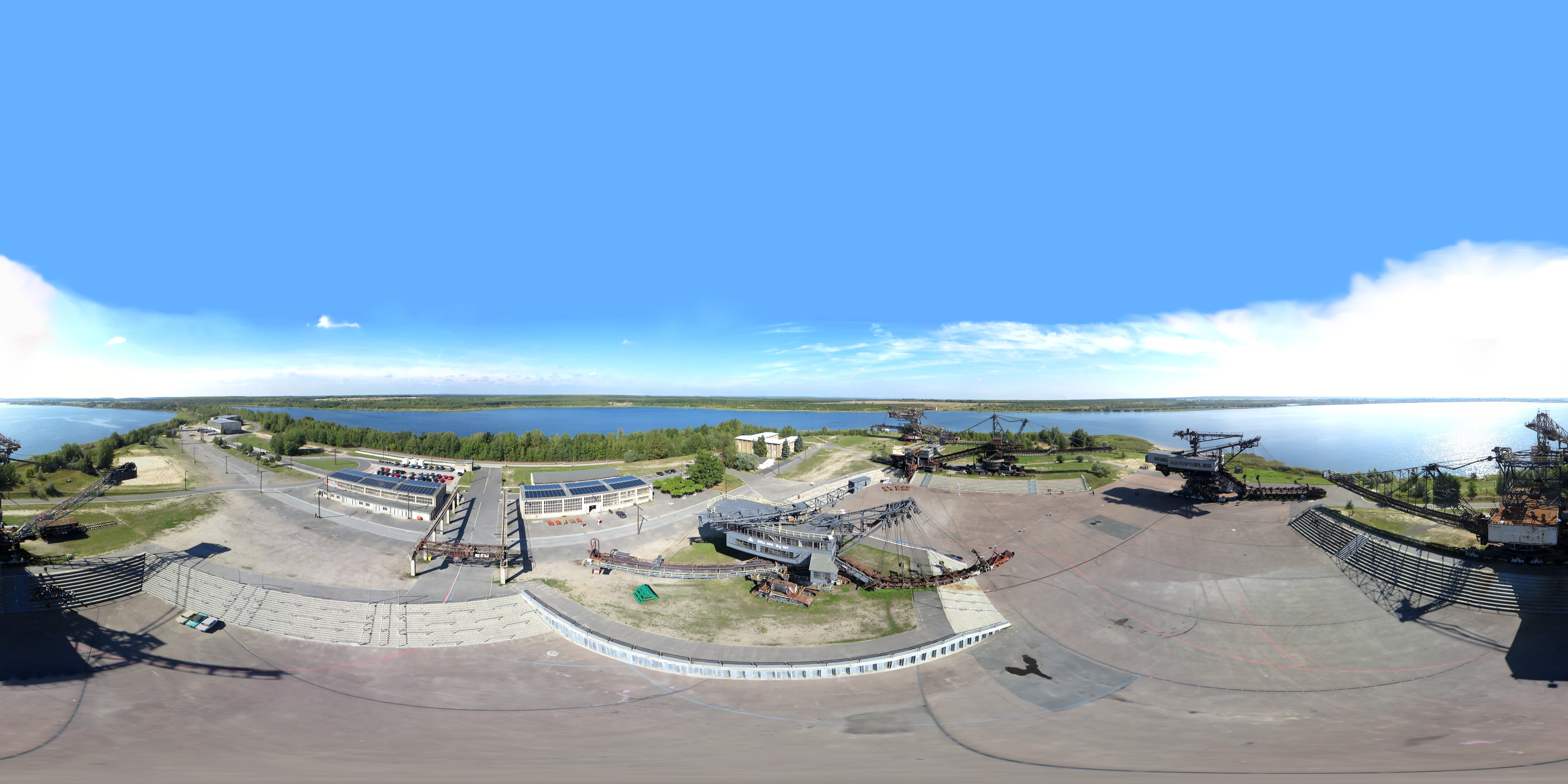
Ferropolis in Gräfenhainichen

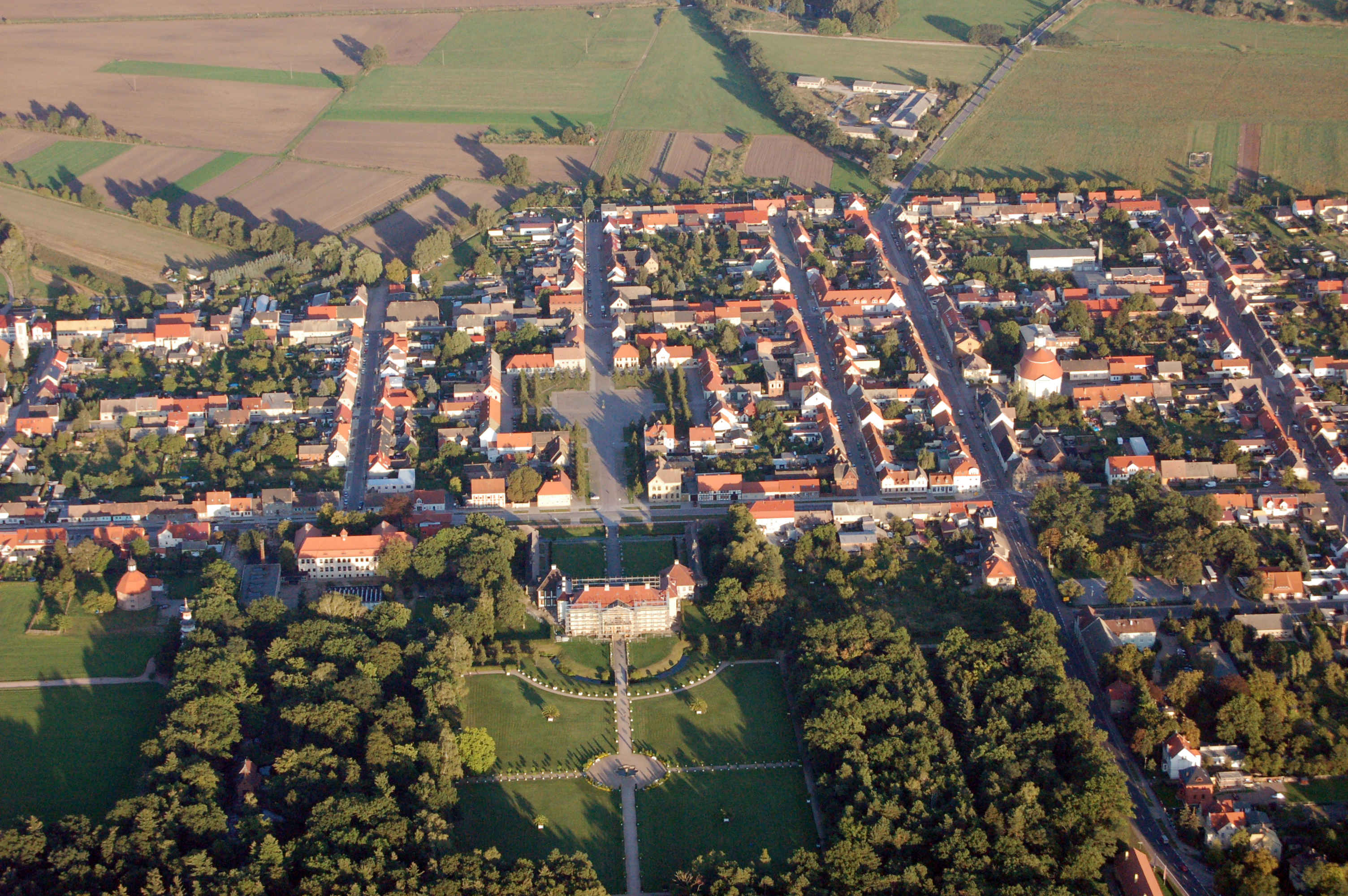
Oranienbaum aerial view

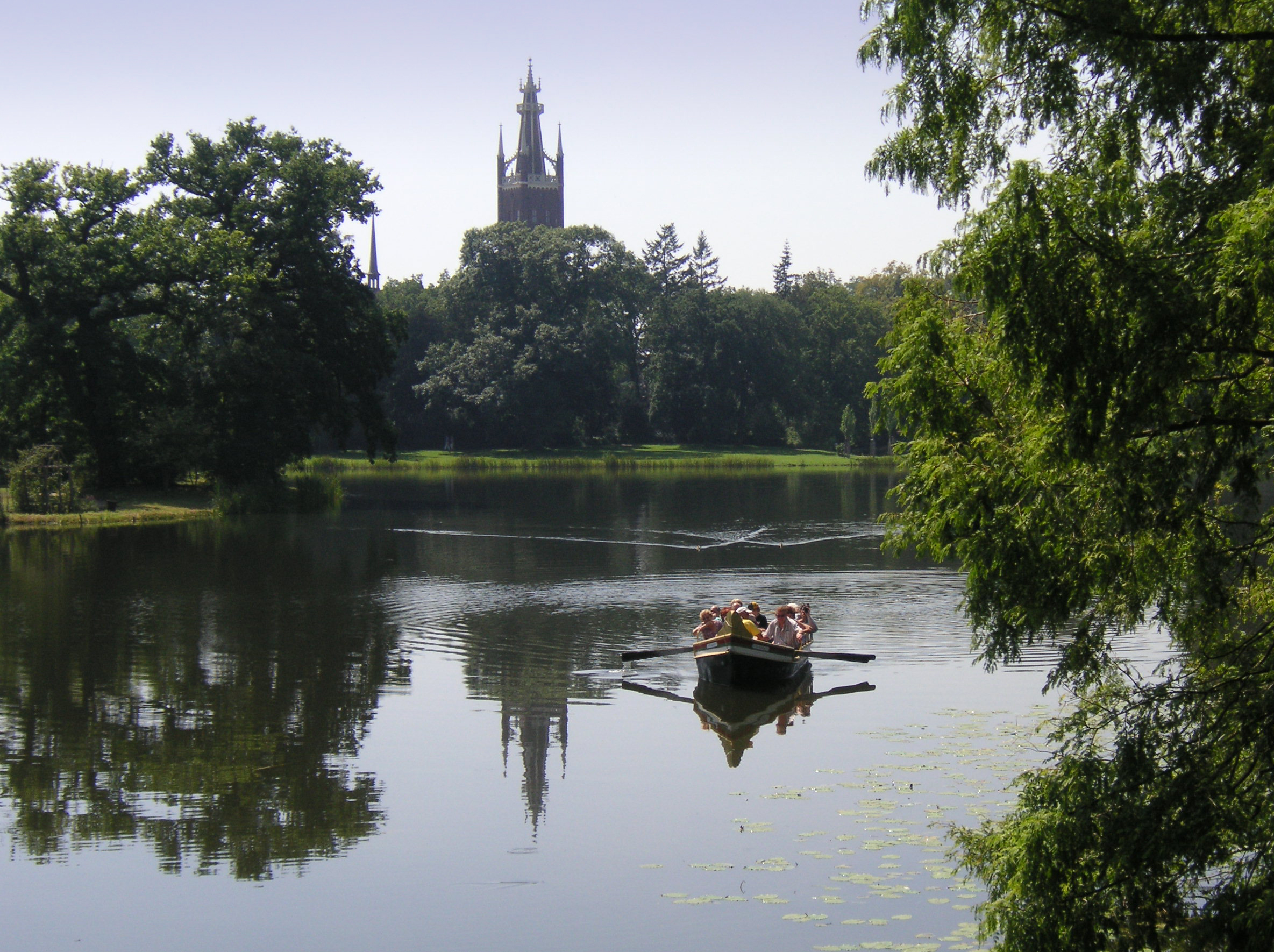
The Dessau-Wörlitz Garden Realm

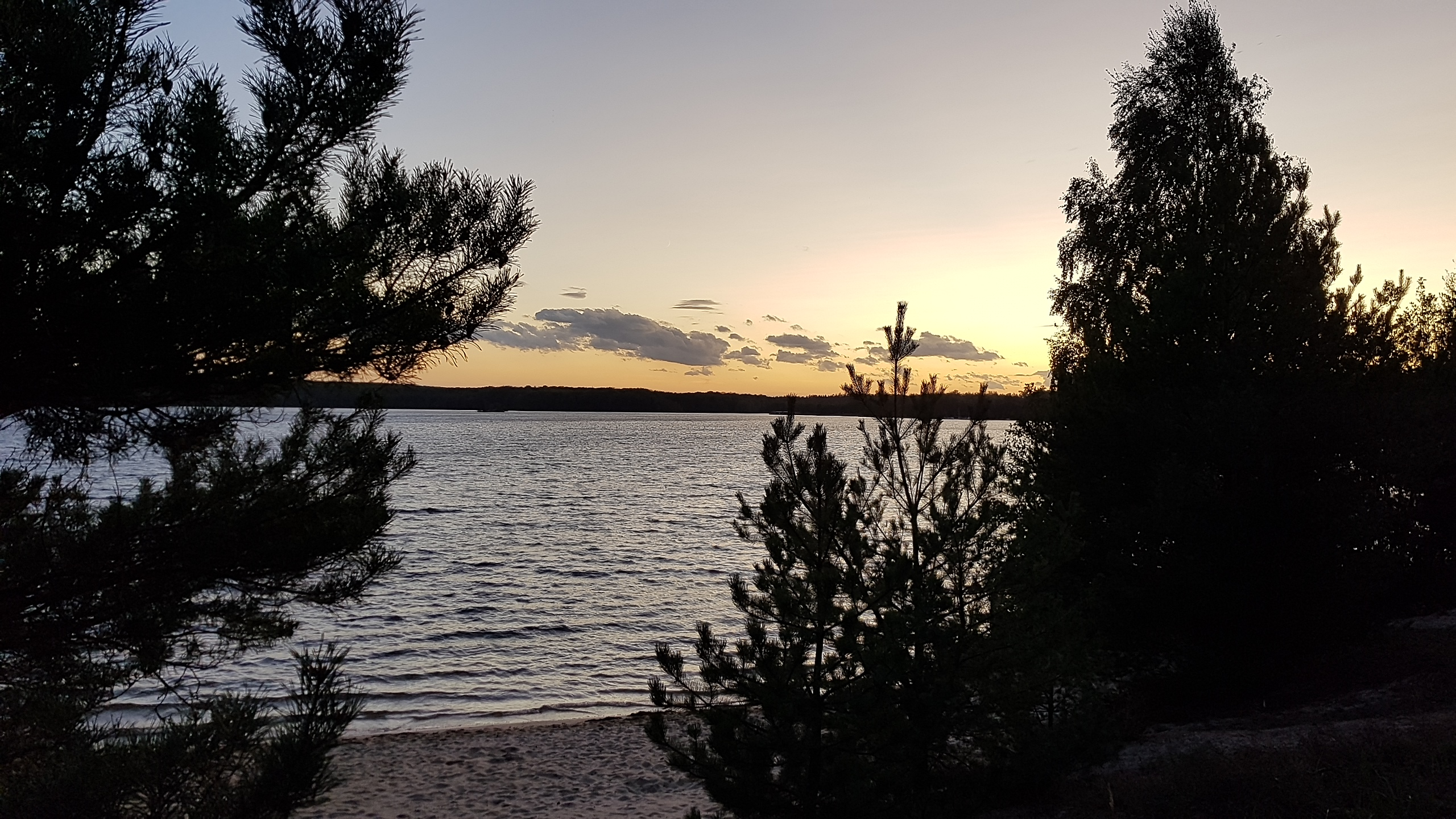
Bergwitz lake
