= Wörlitzer Winkel =

Municipality in Saxony-Anhalt, Germany

Coordinates: 51°48′N 12°24′E

Wörlitzer Winkel was a Verwaltungsgemeinschaft ("collective municipality") in the Wittenberg district, in Saxony-Anhalt, Germany. It was situated on the left bank of the Elbe, east of Dessau. The seat of the Verwaltungsgemeinschaft was in Oranienbaum. It was disbanded in January 2011.

The Verwaltungsgemeinschaft Wörlitzer Winkel consisted of the following municipalities (population in 2005 between brackets):

1. Brandhorst (102)
2. Gohrau (427)
3. Griesen (364)
4. Horstdorf (633)
5. Kakau (609)
6. Oranienbaum (3.439)
7. Rehsen (272)
8. Riesigk (215)
9. Vockerode (1.682)
10. Wörlitz (1.601)
