= Oranienbaum =

Oranienbaum may refer to:

Germany

- Oranienbaum, Germany, a town in Saxony-Anhalt, Germany
- Oranienbaum-Wörlitz

Russia

- Oranienbaum, Russia (Russian: Ораниенба́ум), a Russian royal residence
- Lomonosov, Russia (a.k.a. Oranienbaum-Lomonosov), the former name of the adjacent town
- Oranienbaum Bridgehead
- Battle of Narva (1944) or Oranienbaum Offensive
