= Wörlitz Synagogue =

Former historic synagogue, now museum, in Wörlitz (Saxony-Anhalt), Germany

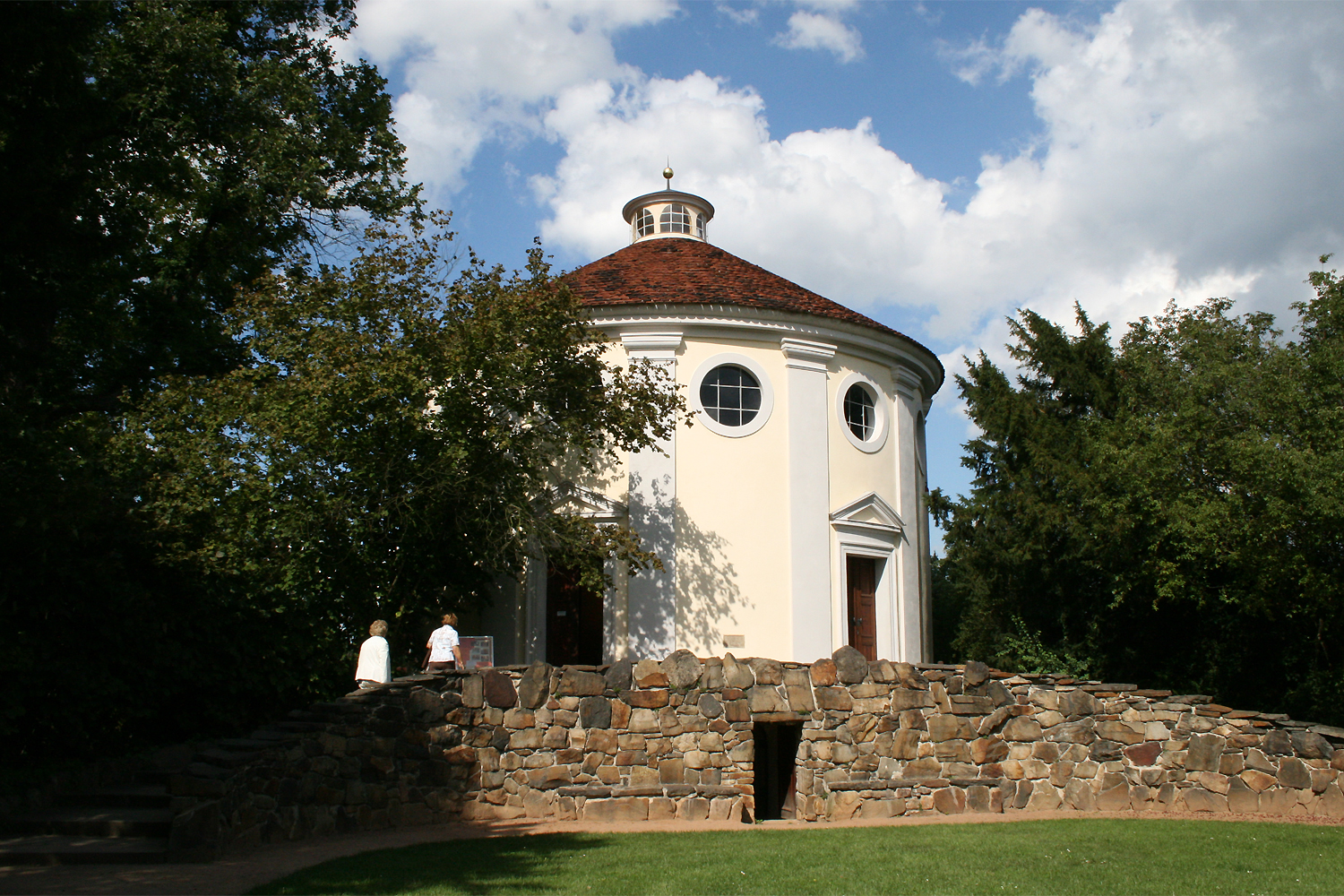
- The former synagogue, now museum, in 2007

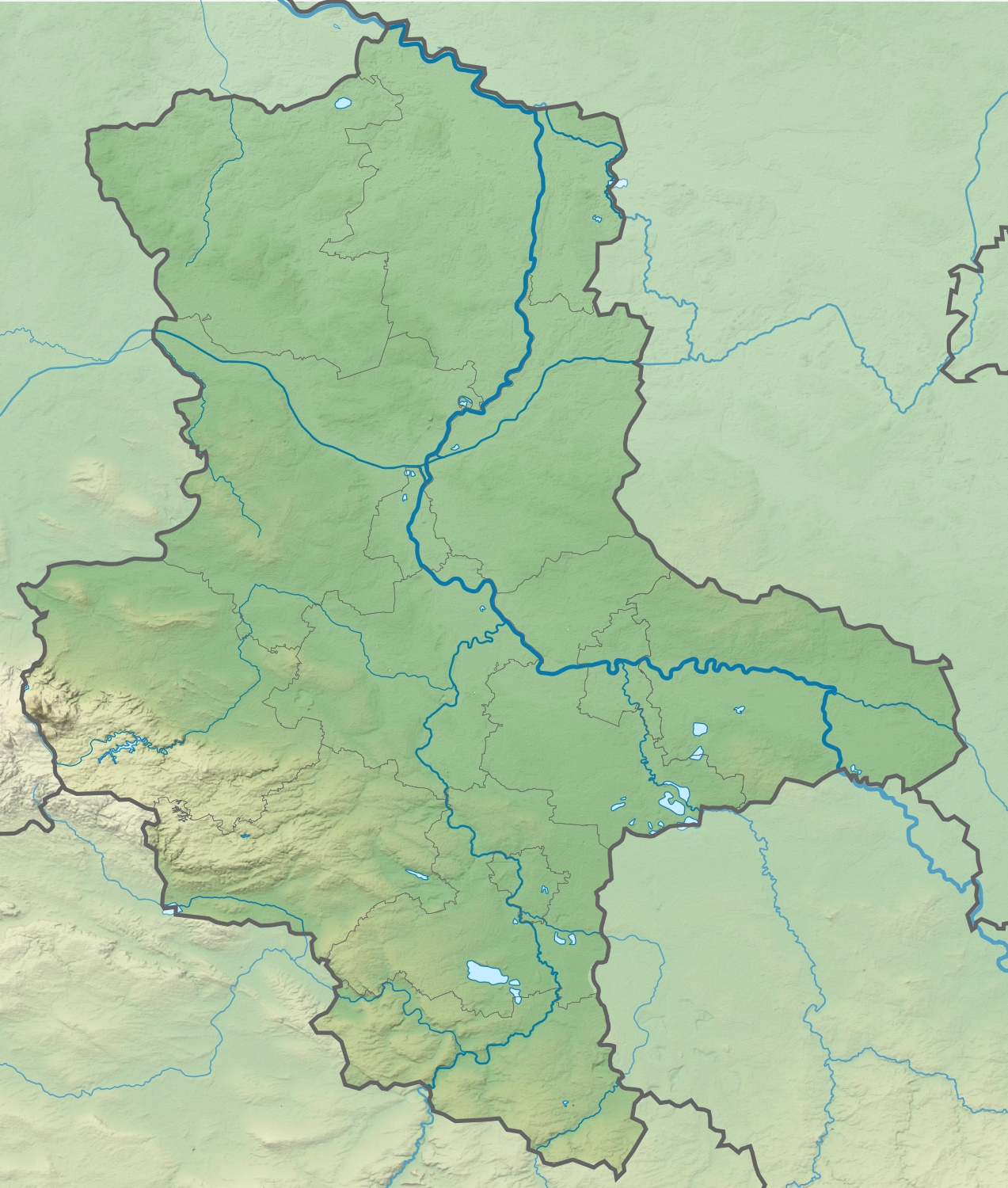
- Location of the former synagogue, now museum, in Saxony-Anhalt

Religion
- Affiliation: Judaism (former)
- Ecclesiastical or organisational status: Synagogue (1790–c. 1937); Jewish museum (since 2003)
- Status: Closed (as a synagogue); Repurposed

Location
- Location: Oranienbaum-Wörlitz, Saxony-Anhalt
- Country: Germany
- Coordinates: 51°50′44″N 12°25′27″E

Architecture
- Architect: Friedrich Wilhelm von Erdmannsdorff
- Type: Synagogue architecture
- Style: Neoclassical
- Completed: 1790

The Wörlitz Synagogue is a former Jewish congregation and synagogue built in 1790 by order of Duke Leopold III of Anhalt-Dessau. It is located within the Dessau-Wörlitz Garden Realm, a UNESCO World Heritage Site since 2000.

== History ==
The duke, a follower of the Enlightenment, had the synagogue built as an expression of his tolerance policy but also as an ornament for his gardens. The prior synagogue was torn down in the course of embellishing Wörlitz. It was the sole synagogue in the tiny town of Wörlitz and was used by its Jewish community in an era when Jews lived in German principalities by permission of the prince (here: Anhalt-Dessau).

The synagogue was designed by the Duke's court architect Friedrich Wilhelm von Erdmannsdorff, who modeled it after the "Temple of Vesta" in Tivoli.

Twelve pilasters adorn the exterior. One door led to the ground floor, entering the room opposite the Torah Ark. The other to the semicircular gallery supported by six Doric columns. The bimah was in the center of the building. There are twelve round windows just below the roofline. The roof is a cone. The basement contained a mikvah and stove to heat the water.

The synagogue was renamed "Temple of Vesta" and robbed of its religious function and furnishings. This "Temple of Vesta" was declared a national monument by the Nazi government in 1937. Although the building was badly damaged during the 1938 Nazi Kristallnacht pogrom, the park's administration was able to prevent its complete demolition. Since 2003 it has been restored and is now a small museum showcasing the history of the Jewish community of Wörlitz.

== See also ==
- History of the Jews in Germany
- List of synagogues in Germany (in German)
