= Dessau-Wörlitz Garden Realm =

World Heritage Site in Germany

UNESCO World Heritage Site
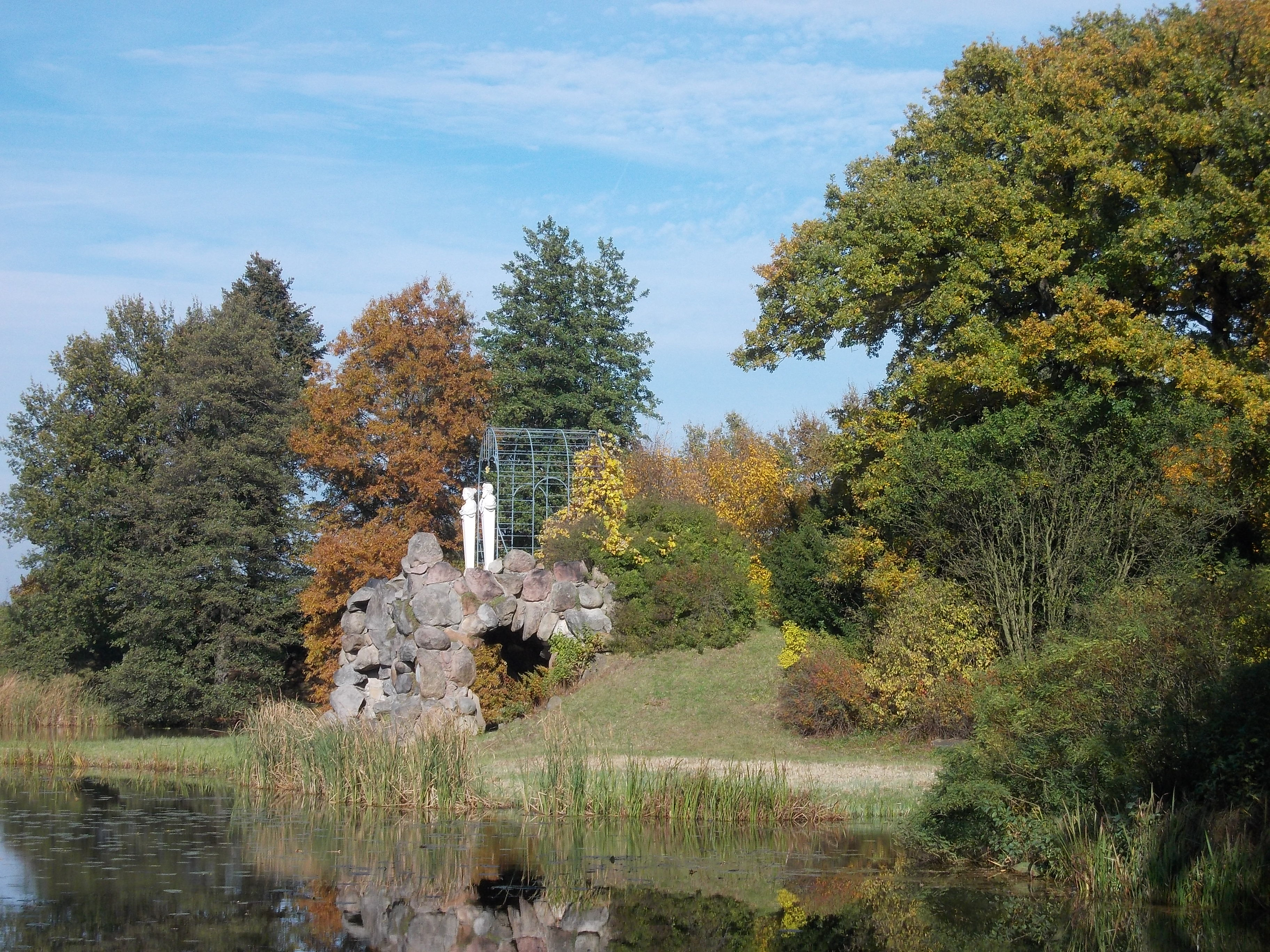
- Amalia's Grotto in the gardens of Wörlitz

- Location within Germany Location within Saxony-Anhalt
- Location: Saxony-Anhalt, Germany
- Criteria: Cultural: (ii), (iv)
- Reference: 534rev
- Inscription: 2000 (24th Session)
- Area: 14,500 ha (36,000 acres)
- Coordinates: 51°50′33″N 12°25′15″E

The Dessau-Wörlitz Garden Realm (German: Dessau-Wörlitzer Gartenreich) is a cultural landscape and World Heritage Site in Germany, located between the city of Dessau and the town of Wörlitz in Central Germany. One of the first and largest English parks in Germany and continental Europe, it was created in the late 18th century under the regency of Duke Leopold III of Anhalt-Dessau. Today, the cultural landscape of Dessau-Wörlitz encompasses an area of 142 km^{2} (55 sq mi) within the Middle Elbe Biosphere Reserve in the German state of Saxony-Anhalt. Because of its exceptional landscape design and testimony to the ideals of the Age of Enlightenment, the Dessau-Wörlitz Garden Realm was designated as a world heritage site in 2000.

== Origin ==
The Gardens had its origin in the 17th century, when the marriage of Leopold's great-grandfather Prince John George II of Anhalt-Dessau to the Dutch princess Henriette Catharina, daughter of Prince Frederick Henry of Orange (Dutch: Oranje), in 1659 brought a team of engineers and architects from the Low Countries under the supervision of architect Cornelis Ryckwaert to lay out the town, the palace and a Baroque garden in the former settlement of Nischwitz, which was renamed Oranienbaum in 1673. The Dutch influence remained prevalent in the Principality of Anhalt-Dessau for many decades.

In 1758, Prince Leopold III became the Duke of Anhalt-Dessau, and five years later he and his friend, the architect Friedrich Wilhelm von Erdmannsdorff, embarked on a Grand Tour across Europe. The tour (in particular the ancient architecture of Italy and the English landscape gardens), and the ideals of The Enlightenment they encountered abroad heavily influenced their artistic tendencies. The two men aimed to move from the formal garden concept of the Baroque era to a more naturalistic landscape, as they had seen at Stourhead Gardens and Ermenonville.

As early as 1765, Leopold III began to make architectural and landscape changes to the countryside in order to realize these ideals. The Wörlitz gardens served as the starting point of the programme, becoming the first landscape garden in continental Europe. Over the next 40 years, Leopold adapted or developed several other parks and palaces to fit the Enlightenment aesthetic, including the Oranienbaum Palace, Georgium Castle, Mosigkau Castle, and Großkühnau Castle.

== Wörlitzer Park ==
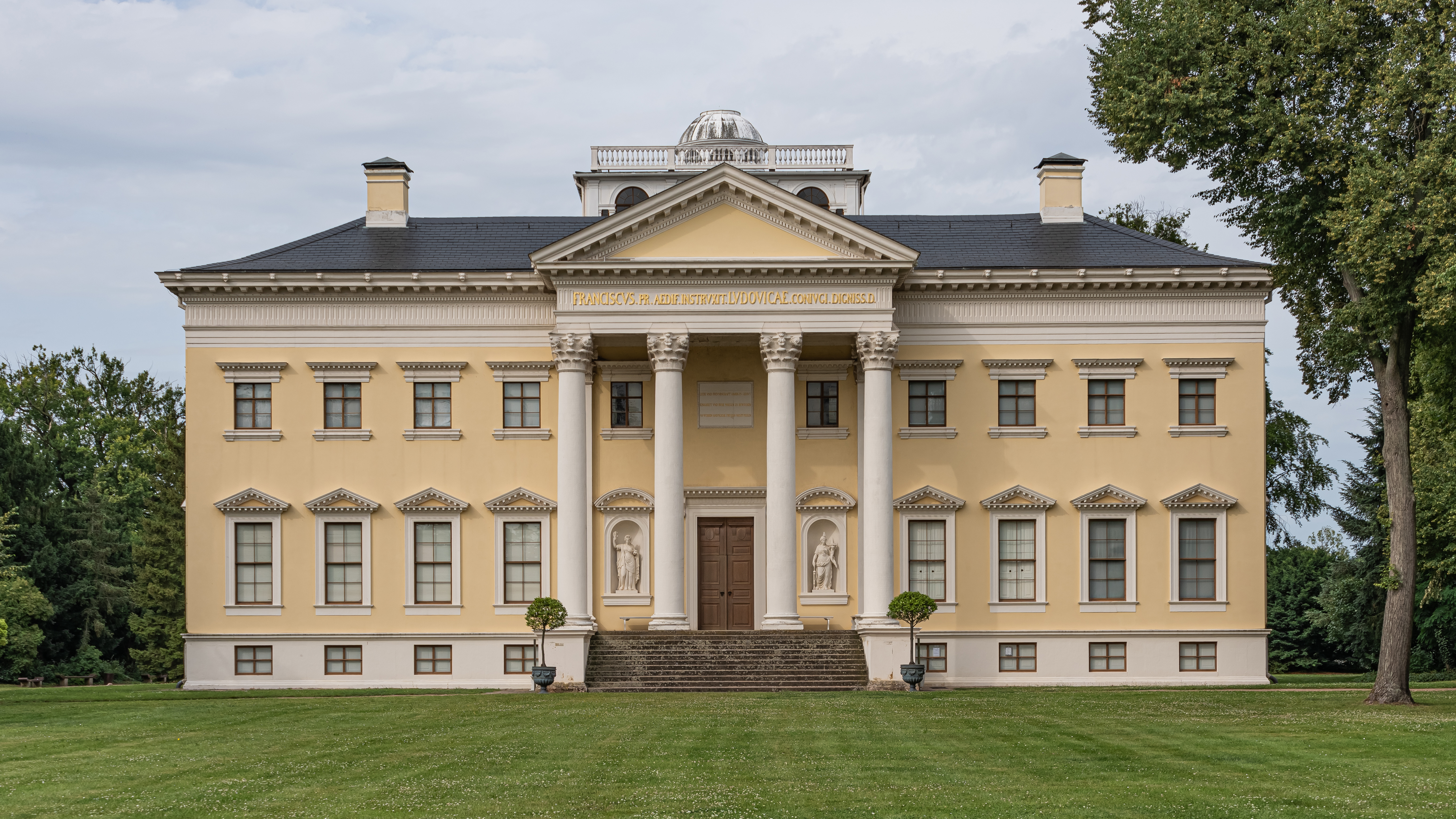
Wörlitz Palace

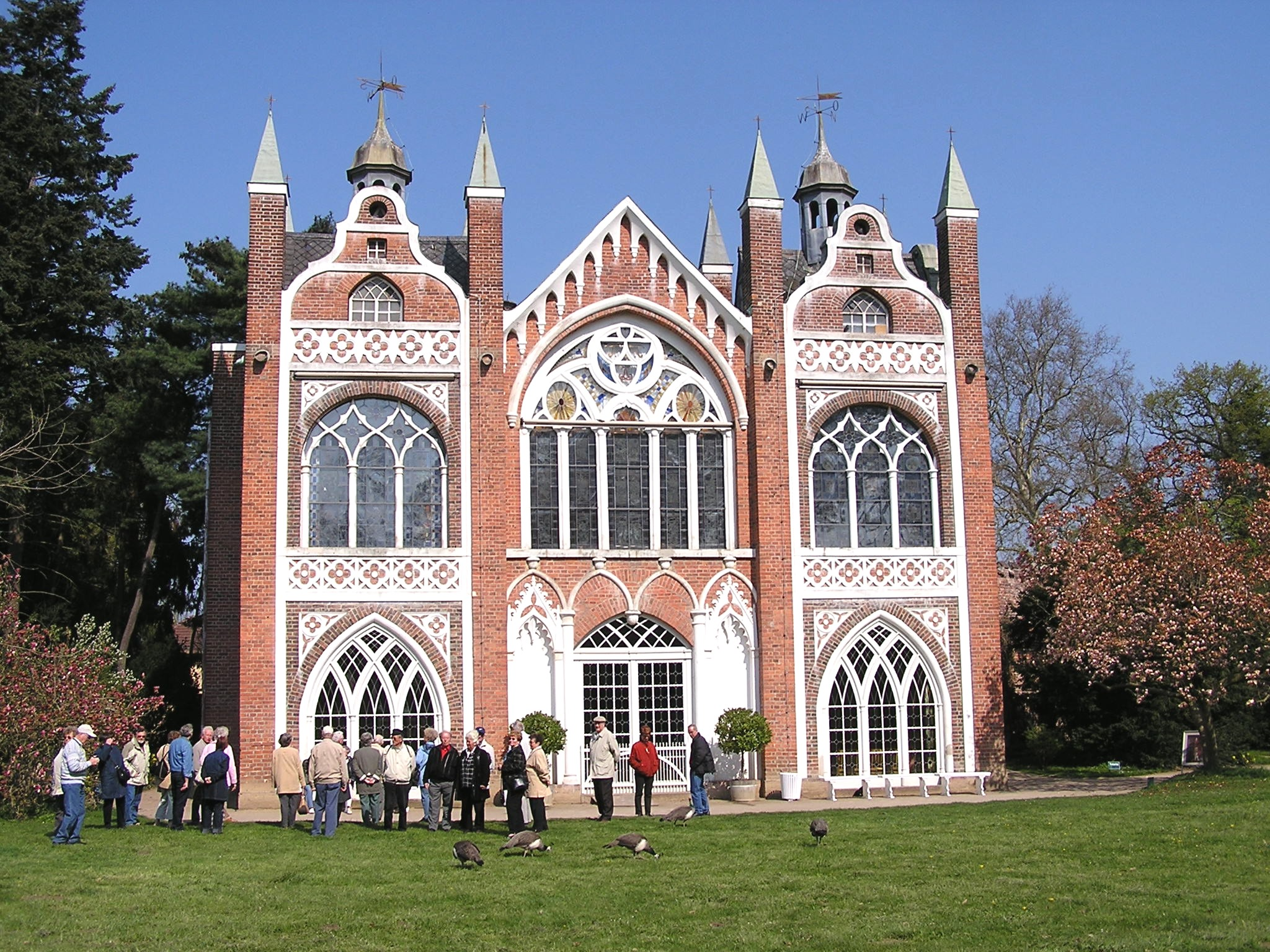
Gothic House (Wörlitz)

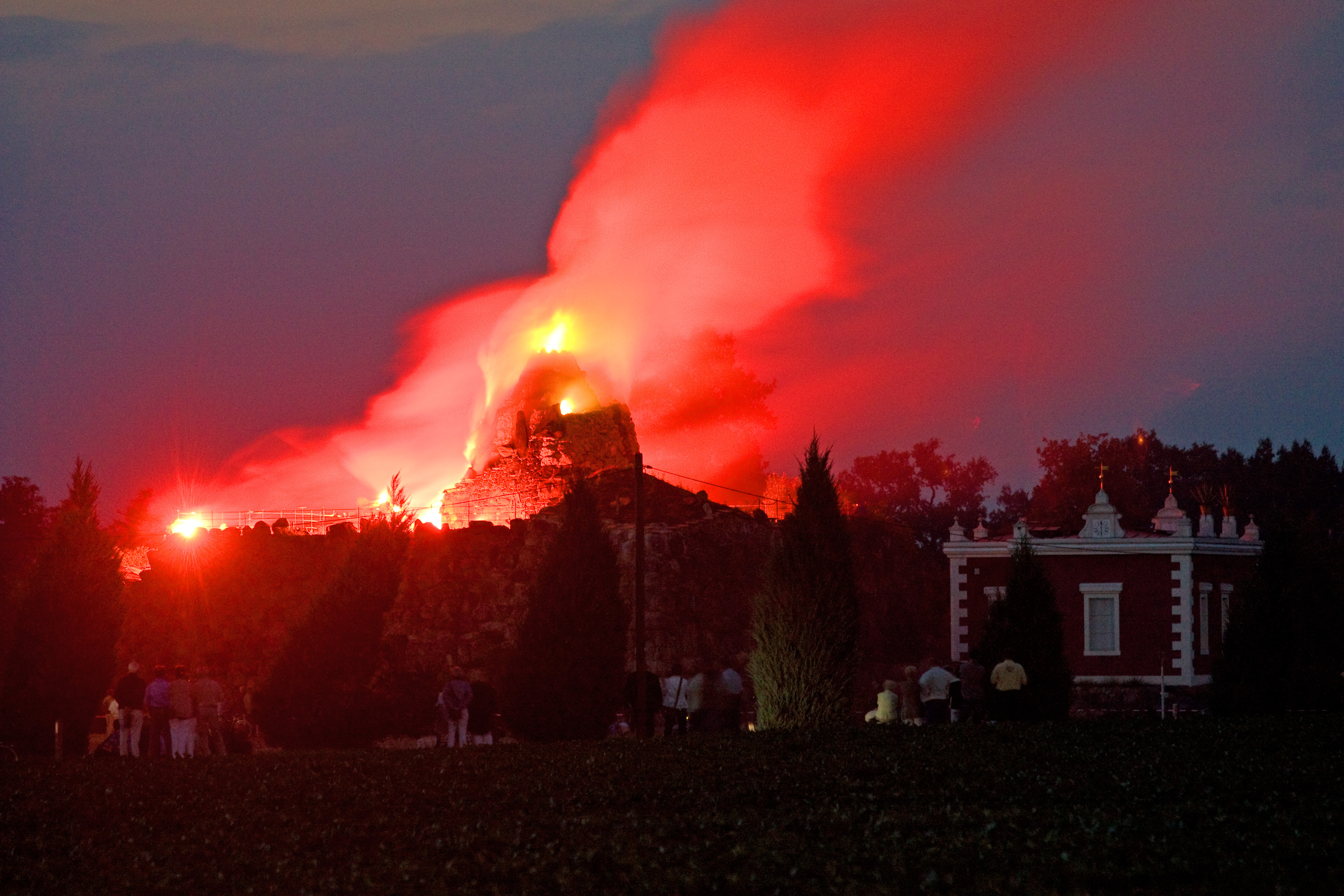
Artificial volcano erupting

The central Wörlitzer Park lies adjacent to the small town of Wörlitz at an anabranch of the Elbe river, making it rich in water and diversity. It was laid out between 1769 and 1773 as one of the first English gardens on the continent. According to the ideals of Duke Leopold III the park would also serve as an educational institution in architecture, gardening and agriculture, therefore large parts were open to the public from the beginning. Most buildings were designed by Erdmannsdorff, while the gardens were laid out by Johann Friedrich Eyserbeck (1734–1818), a garden architect who was indebted to such English antecedents as Claremont, Stourhead and Stowe Landscape Garden. The gardens are protected from floods of the Elbe river in the north by a dam which is also a belt-walk offering numerous views along the park's sight lines.

Wörlitz Palace finished in 1773, the residence of Duke Leopold and his wife Louise of Brandenburg-Schwedt, was the first Neoclassical building in present-day Germany. The palace and its interior with valuable cabinets from the studio of Abraham and David Roentgen as well as a large collection of Wedgwood porcelain were publicly accessible. Louise had her private home in the adjacent Graues Haus (Grey House). At the eastern rim of the palace's garden stands the Wörlitz Synagogue built in 1790 as a rotunda modeled after the ancient Temple of Vesta in Tivoli, Italy. The building expressing Leopold's religious tolerance was saved from demolition in the 1938 "Kristallnacht" pogrom by the custodian of the park, who thereupon lost his employment. The Neo-Gothic St Peter's Church in the west with its 66 m (217 ft) tall steeple was finished in 1809.

The philosophy of Jean-Jacques Rousseau and the aesthetic of Johann Joachim Winckelmann underlie the design of the park and will lead to the creation of follies. Rousseau saw agriculture as the basis of everyday life and pointed out to educational functions of the natural landscape. Unsurprisingly, the most elegant landscape in the area is Rousseau Island in Neumark's Garden, scored to imitate the island at Ermenonville Park where the philosopher was buried.

An island on the artificial Wörlitz Lake features Europe's only artificial volcano. When Leopold III went on a grand tour of Europe in the 1760s, he was captivated by a trip to Naples in which he saw a smouldering Mount Vesuvius and would have heard about the newly-discovered town of Pompeii. Twenty-two years later, the German royal set about bringing a piece of Naples to Germany; he had his architect build a brick inner building nearly five stories high and cover it with local boulders. At the top, a hollow cone was made and contained a high chamber, complete with three fireplaces and a roof that contained an "artificial crater" that could be filled with water. He then constructed a lake around the volcano and invited his friends to watch an eruption. Only contemporary accounts detail what the 18th-century artificial eruption would have been like, but the practice still takes place today, complete with modern effects, after the island was restored to its past glory.

Minor structures of the Garden Realm, stretching for some 25 km, had far-reaching ramifications in architecture of Central Europe. The "Gothic House", started by Erdmannsdorff in 1774, modeled on the villa of Horace Walpole at Strawberry Hill, was one of the first Neo Gothic structures on the continent. The park also features replicas of Roman temples, including the Pantheon built in 1795. In the early years of the following century, the landscape was enriched with the Neo-Gothic churches in the neighbouring villages of Riesigk (1800) and Vockerode (1811).

The grounds, which had been divided into four parts since the construction of a railway line and the Bundesautobahn 9 in the 1930s, were designated a World Heritage Site by UNESCO in 2000. ICOMOS, however, noted that "the overall structure of the landscape has undergone a good deal of deterioration".

== Oranienbaum ==
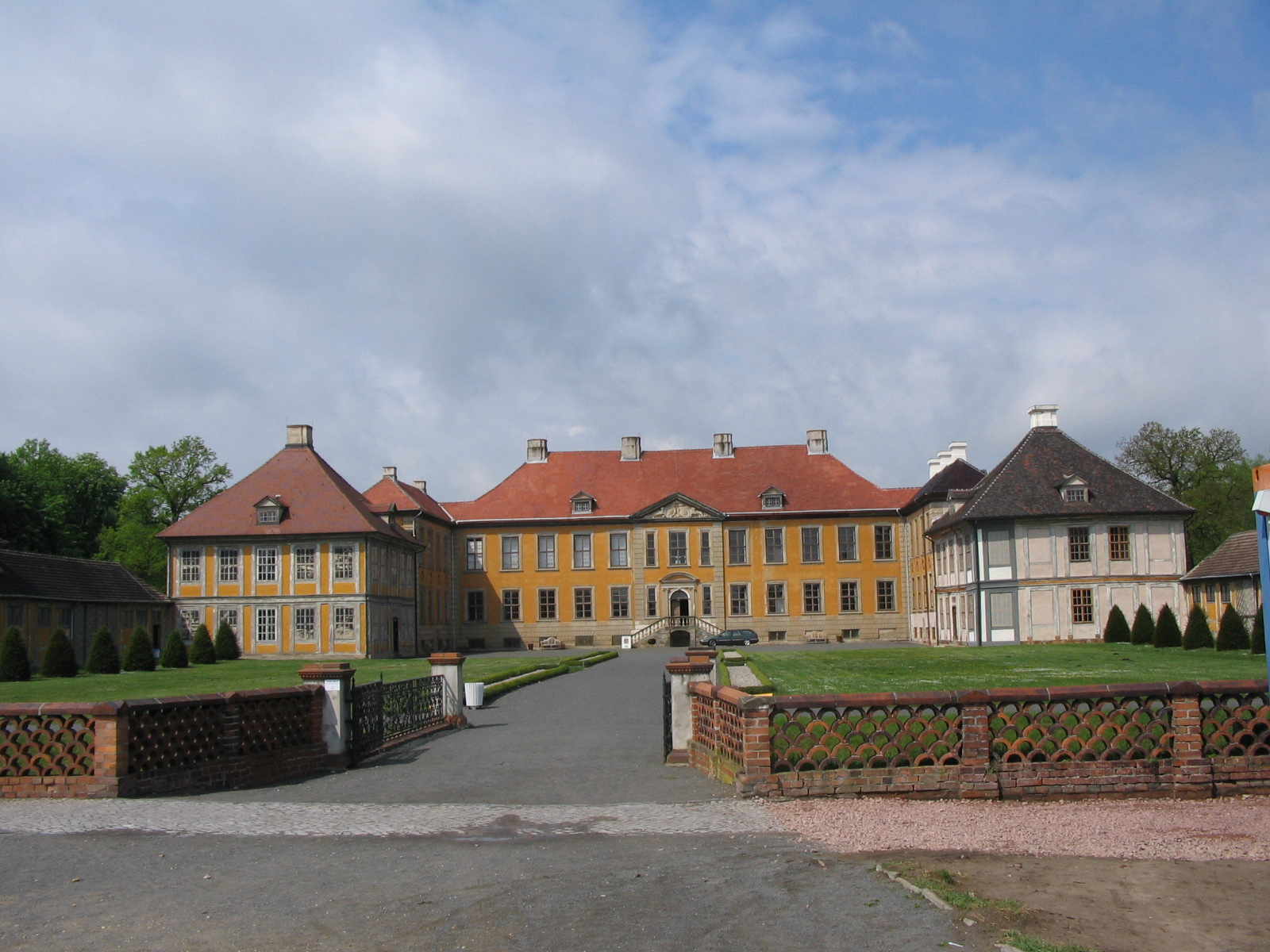
Oranienbaum Palace

The original Oranienbaum Palace was finished in 1683 as the summer residence of Henriette Catharina, where she retired after the death of her husband in 1693. The rich furnishing includes leather wallpapers and a dining room equipped with Delft tiles. However, in 1780 Duke Leopold III had the palace and the park rebuilt in a Chinese style, according to the theories of Sir William Chambers, with several arch bridges, a tea house and a pagoda. In 1811, the orangery was built, with 175 m (574 ft) in length one of the largest in Europe, which still serves to protect a wide collection of citrus plants. Oranienbaum Palace together with the park and the geometrical settlement conception forms one of the few original Dutch Baroque town layouts in Germany. Queen Beatrix of the Netherlands, Princess of Orange-Nassau, inspected the restoration works on 3 March 2004.

== Georgium Palace ==
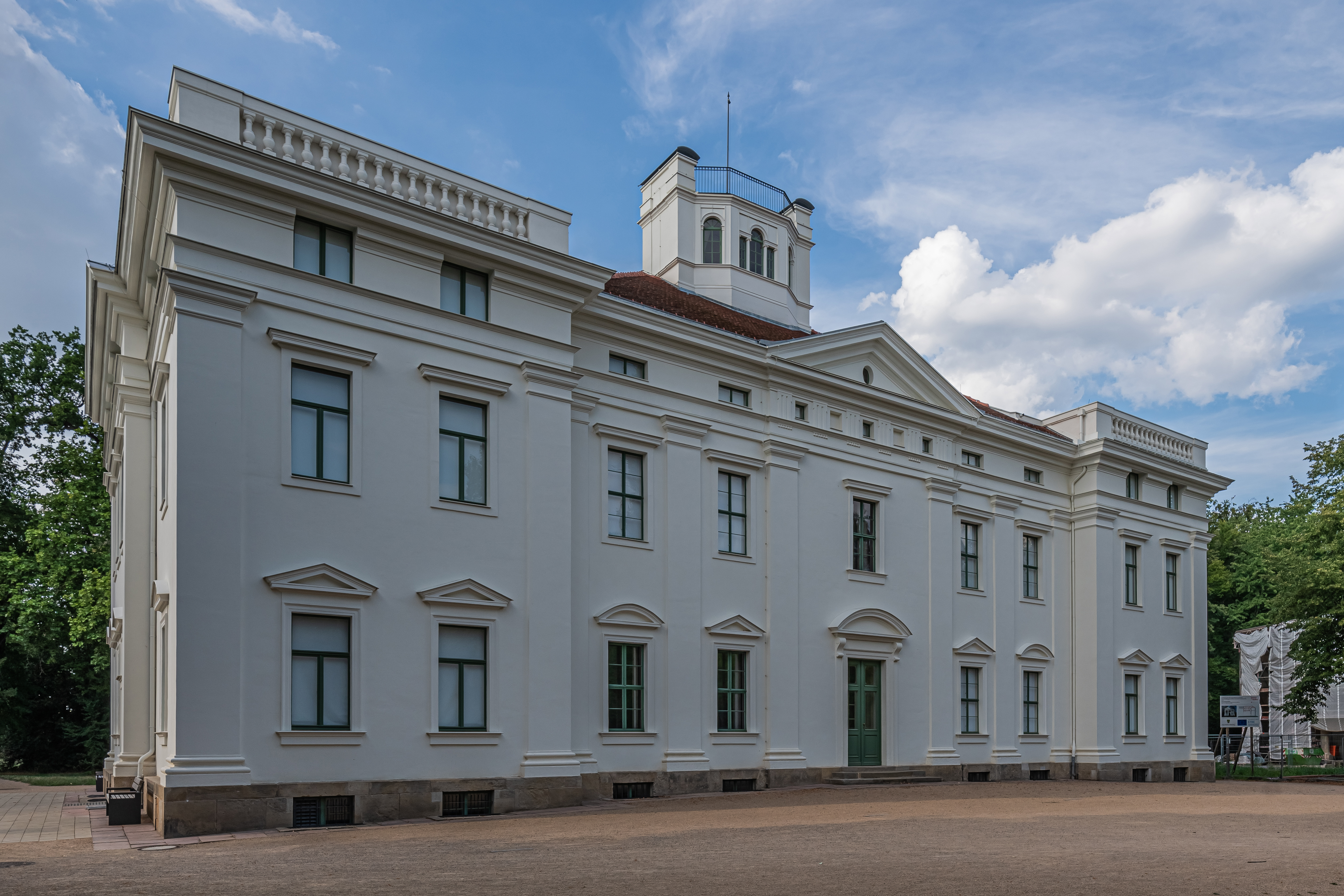
Georgium Castle

In 1780, John George (1748–1811), a younger brother of Duke Leopold III, had the Georgium Castle by Erdmannsdorff. Located in a riparian woodland north of Dessau, the palace features an English garden with several monuments. The garden is the second largest within the Garden Kingdom aside from the Wörlitz gardens. Today the Georgium hosts the Anhalt collection of art, including works by Albrecht Dürer – especially an old master print of his Melencolia I – and Lucas Cranach the Elder.

== Luisium Castle ==
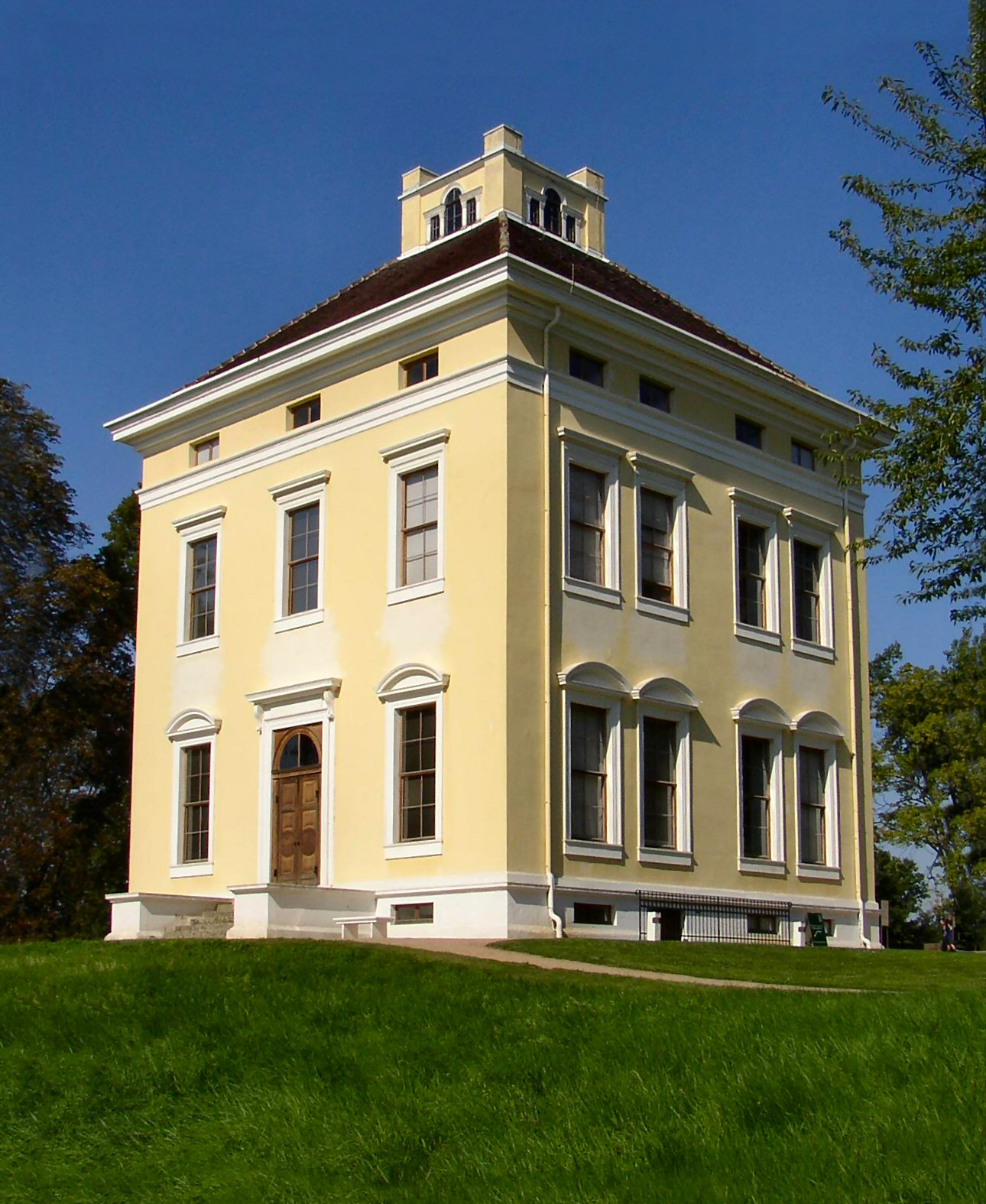
Luisium Castle

Luisium Castle is located in the Waldersee district of Dessau, and was a gift from Duke Leopold III to his wife Louise. It was built between 1774 and 1778 in a plain Neoclassical style as a country home according to plans by Erdmannsdorff with adjacent gardens, pastures and a stud farm. The rooms on the ground floor and first story are decorated with ornate stucco decorations and wall paintings. Nearby is the neogothic Snake House, which was used as a holiday home and tea-house. The orangery at the Snake House draws its design from London's Kew Gardens. Leopold died at the castle on 9 August 1817 from the consequences of a riding accident.

== Mosigkau Palace ==
Mosigkau Palace in the west of Dessau is one of the few Rococo palaces in Central Germany, resembling Sanssouci at Potsdam, which had been designed by Georg Wenzeslaus von Knobelsdorff. It was built between 1752 and 1757 for Anna Wilhelmine of Anhalt-Dessau, the daughter of Prince Leopold I. The ensemble includes an orangery and an art collection of Flemish Baroque painting, stemming from Duke John George's II union with the House of Orange-Nassau, that features works by Peter Paul Rubens and Anthony van Dyck.

== Großkühnau Castle ==
Großkühnau Castle marks the western end of the Garden Realm. It was built in 1780 for Albert of Anhalt-Dessau, a younger brother of Duke Leopold III, at Kühnau Lake. The park includes several artificial islands, fruit tree orchards and a vineyard. Today the castle is the seat of the Kulturstiftung Dessau-Wörlitz, the trust running the park. Furthermore, the Garden Realm encompasses the Leiner Berg forester's lodge, built in 1830, now a restaurant near the Elbe Cycle Route, and the Sieglitzer Berg forest park laid out in 1777.

== Gallery ==
Dessau-Wörlitz Garden Realm
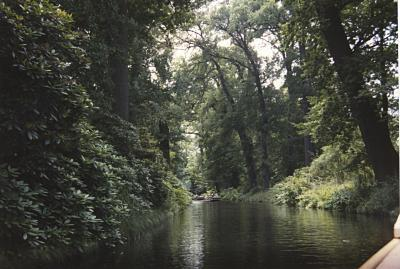
View from a gondola

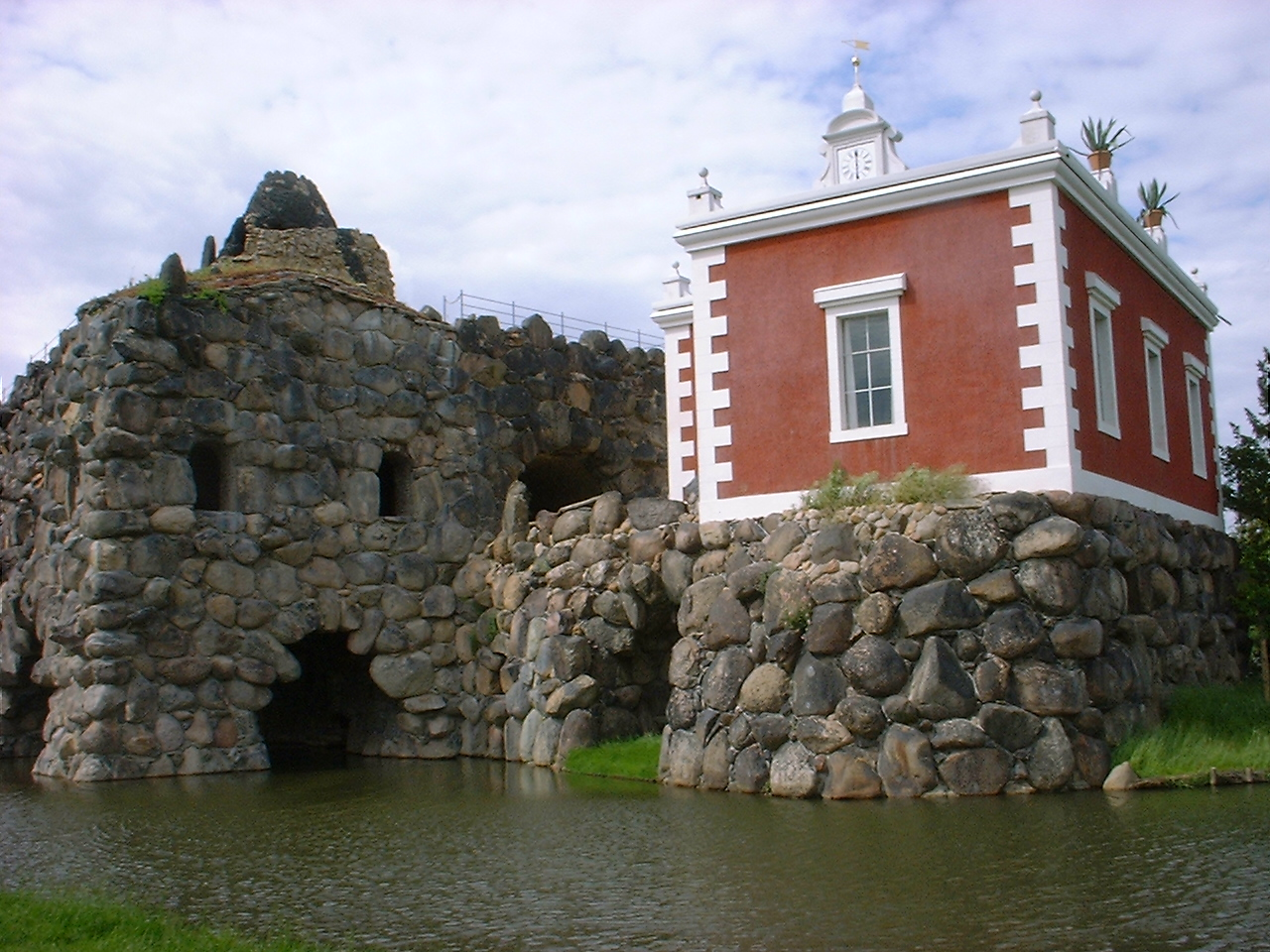
The Rock Island and Villa Hamilton

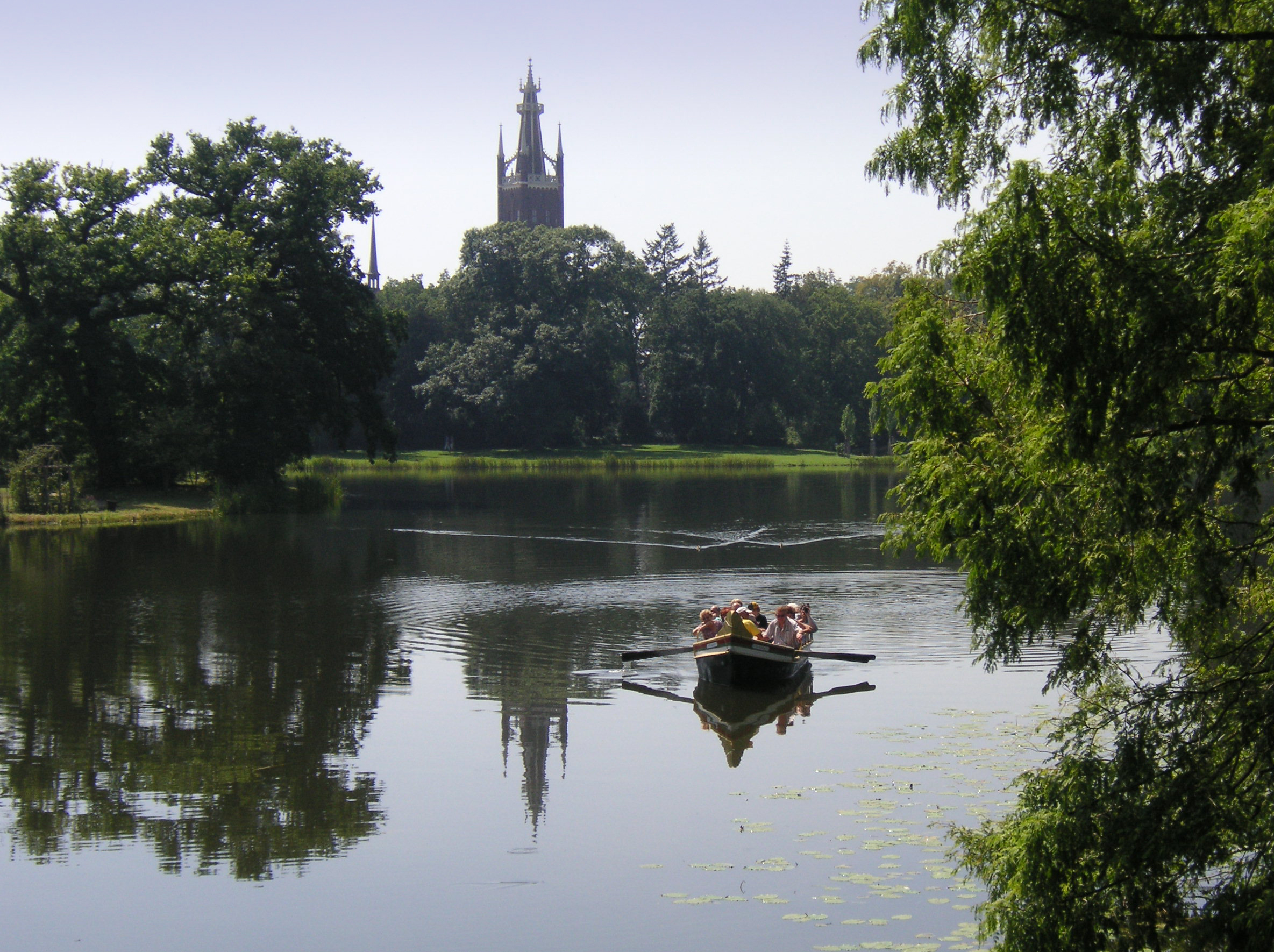
Wörlitz Lake and Church St. Petri in Wörlitz

== Garden dreams ==
Several parks oft the Dessau-Wörlitz Garden Realm are part of the Saxony-Anhalt Garden Dreams project.
