= Horstdorf =

- Ortsteil of Oranienbaum-Wörlitz
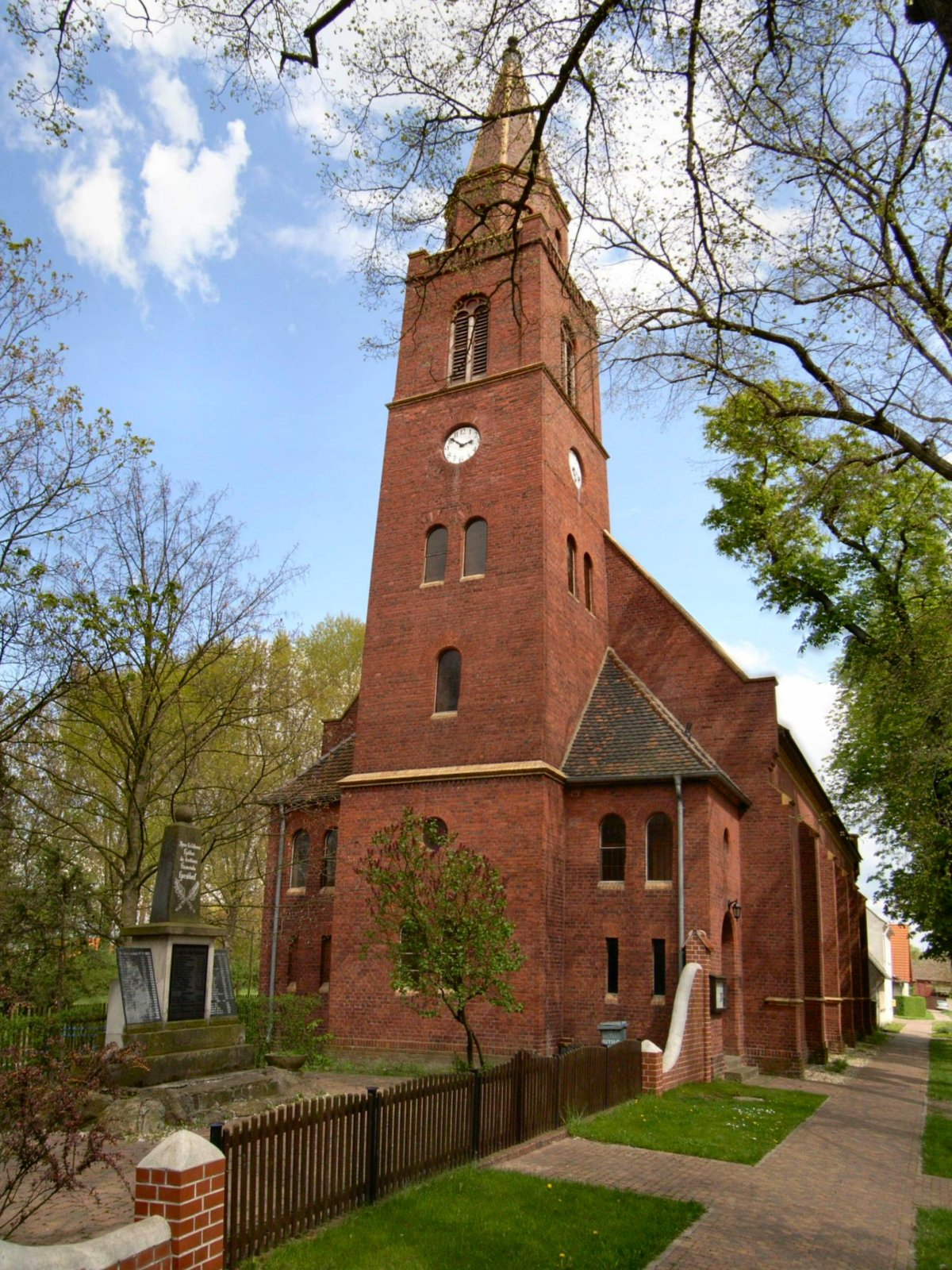
- Interactive map of Horstdorf
- Location within Germany Location within Saxony-Anhalt
- Coordinates: 51°49′3″N 12°26′12″E
- Country: Germany
- State: Saxony-Anhalt
- District: Wittenberg
- Town: Oranienbaum-Wörlitz

Area
  - Total: 3.51 km^{2} (1.36 sq mi)
- Elevation: 61 m (200 ft)

Population (2011)
  - Total: 607
  - Density: 173/km^{2} (448/sq mi)
- Time zone: UTC+01:00 (CET)
  - Summer (DST): UTC+02:00 (CEST)
- Postal codes: 06785
- Dialling codes: 034904
- Vehicle registration: WB

Horstdorf (German pronunciation: [ˈhɔʁstˌdɔʁf]) is a village and a former municipality in the district of Wittenberg, Saxony-Anhalt, Germany. Since 1 January 2011, it is part of the town Oranienbaum-Wörlitz. As of 2011, it had a population of 607 people.
