= Griesen =

- Ortsteil of Oranienbaum-Wörlitz
- Interactive map of Griesen
- Location within Germany Location within Saxony-Anhalt
- Coordinates: 51°49′59″N 12°25′5″E
- Country: Germany
- State: Saxony-Anhalt
- District: Wittenberg
- Town: Oranienbaum-Wörlitz

Area
  - Total: 7.63 km^{2} (2.95 sq mi)
- Elevation: 60 m (200 ft)

Population (2009-12-31)
  - Total: 353
  - Density: 46.3/km^{2} (120/sq mi)
- Time zone: UTC+01:00 (CET)
  - Summer (DST): UTC+02:00 (CEST)
- Postal codes: 06786
- Dialling codes: 034905
- Vehicle registration: WB

Griesen (German pronunciation: [ˈɡʁiːzn̩]) is a village and a former municipality in the district of Wittenberg, Saxony-Anhalt, Germany. Since 1 January 2011, it is part of the town Oranienbaum-Wörlitz.
