= Gohrau =

- Ortsteil of Oranienbaum-Wörlitz
- Interactive map of Gohrau
- Location within Germany Location within Saxony-Anhalt
- Coordinates: 51°49′N 12°28′E
- Country: Germany
- State: Saxony-Anhalt
- District: Wittenberg
- Town: Oranienbaum-Wörlitz

Area
  - Total: 4.92 km^{2} (1.90 sq mi)
- Elevation: 63 m (207 ft)

Population (2009-12-31)
  - Total: 402
  - Density: 81.7/km^{2} (212/sq mi)
- Time zone: UTC+01:00 (CET)
  - Summer (DST): UTC+02:00 (CEST)
- Postal codes: 06786
- Dialling codes: 034905
- Vehicle registration: WB

Gohrau (German pronunciation: [ˈɡoːʁaʊ]) is a village and a former municipality in the district of Wittenberg, Saxony-Anhalt, Germany. Since 1 January 2011, it is part of the town Oranienbaum-Wörlitz.
