= Oranienbaum-Wörlitz =

- Town
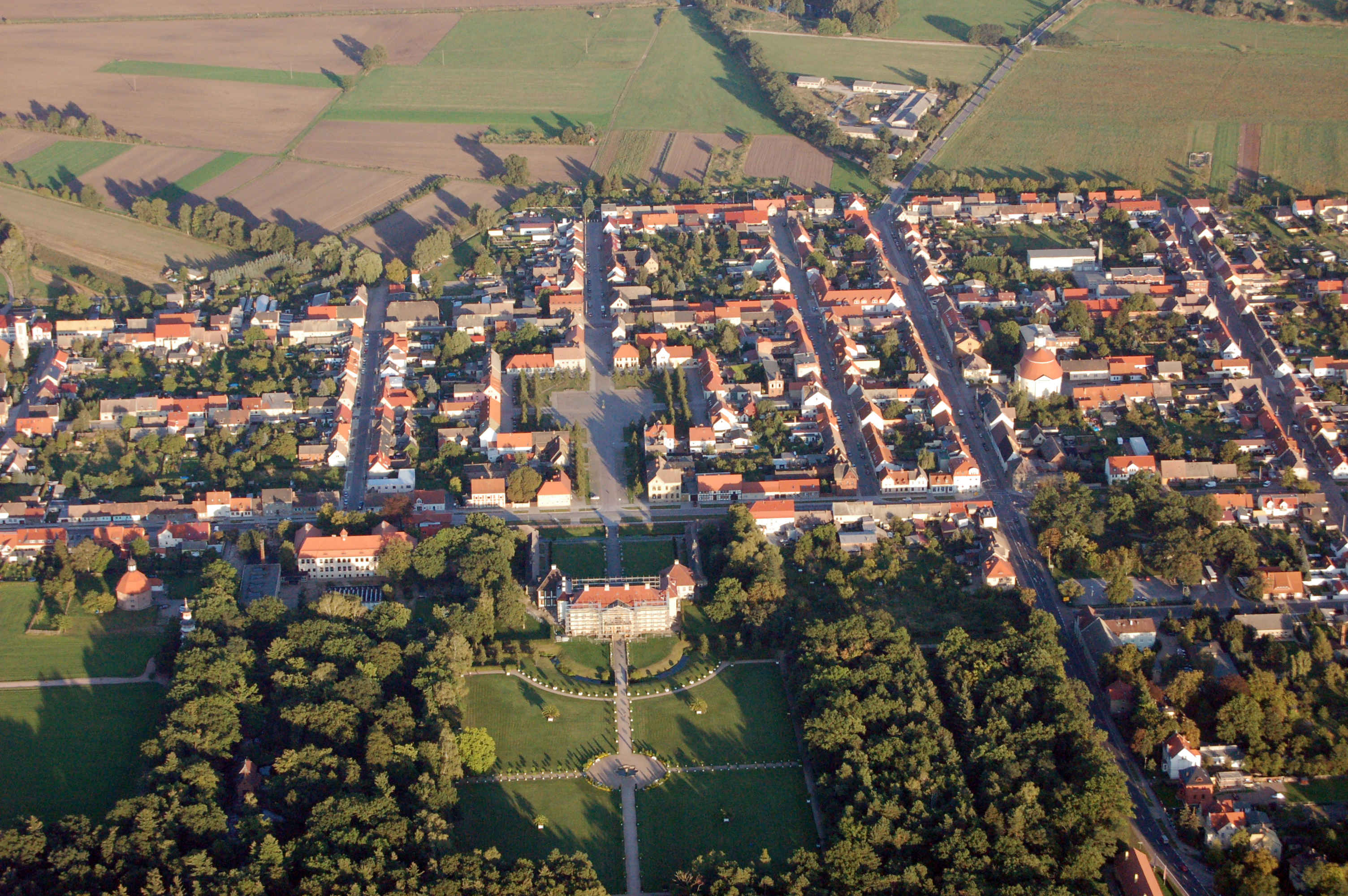
- View over Oranienbaum

- Coat of arms

- Location of Oranienbaum-Wörlitz within Wittenberg district
- Interactive map of Oranienbaum-Wörlitz
- Location within Germany Location within Saxony-Anhalt
- Coordinates: 51°47′57″N 12°24′25″E
- Country: Germany
- State: Saxony-Anhalt
- District: Wittenberg

Government
  - Mayor (2017–24): Maik Strömer (CDU)

Area
  - Total: 115.16 km^{2} (44.46 sq mi)
- Elevation: 64 m (210 ft)

Population (2025-12-31)
  - Total: 7,863
  - Density: 68.28/km^{2} (176.8/sq mi)
- Time zone: UTC+01:00 (CET)
  - Summer (DST): UTC+02:00 (CEST)
- Postal codes: 06785, 06786
- Dialling codes: 034904, 034905
- Vehicle registration: WB
- Website: www.oranienbaum-woerlitz.de

Oranienbaum-Wörlitz (German pronunciation: [oˈʁaːniənˌbaʊm ˈvœʁlɪts]) is a town in the district of Wittenberg, in Saxony-Anhalt, Germany. It was formed on 1 January 2011 by the merger of the former towns Oranienbaum and Wörlitz and the former municipalities Brandhorst, Gohrau, Griesen, Horstdorf, Kakau, Rehsen, Riesigk and Vockerode. These former municipalities are now Ortschaften (municipal divisions) of the town Oranienbaum-Wörlitz.

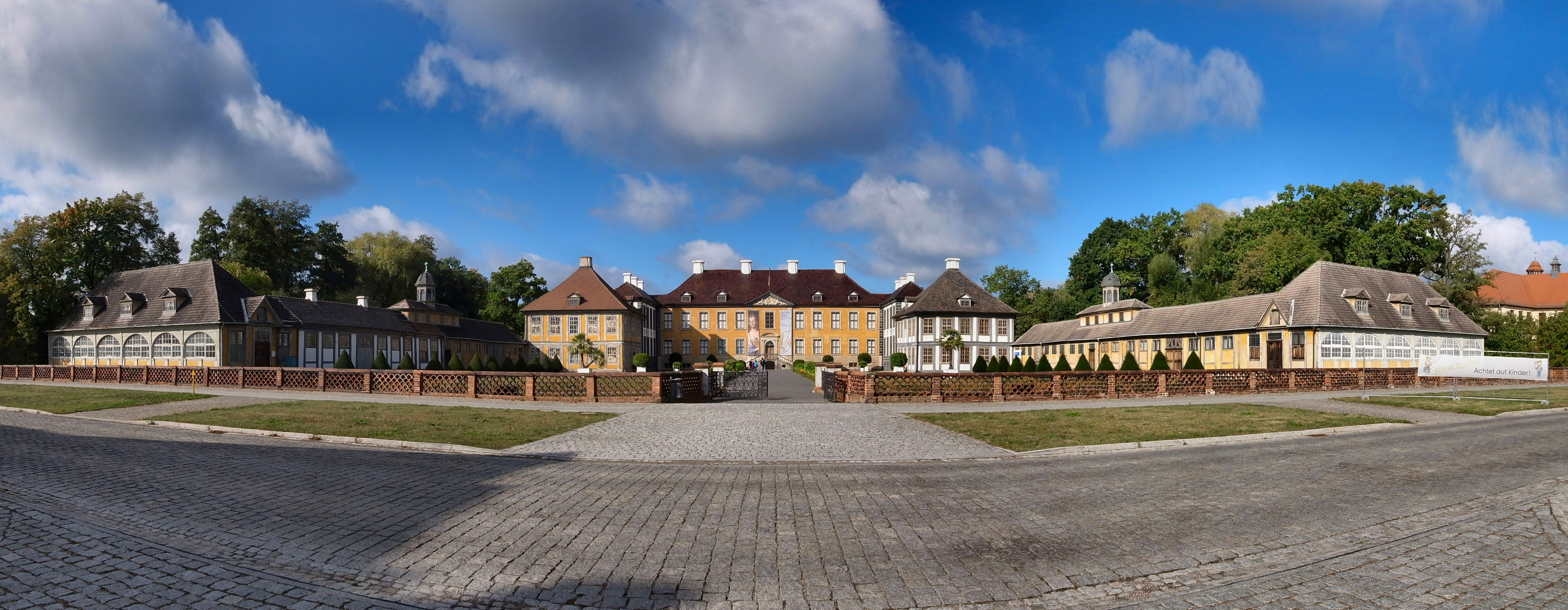
Oranienbaum castle

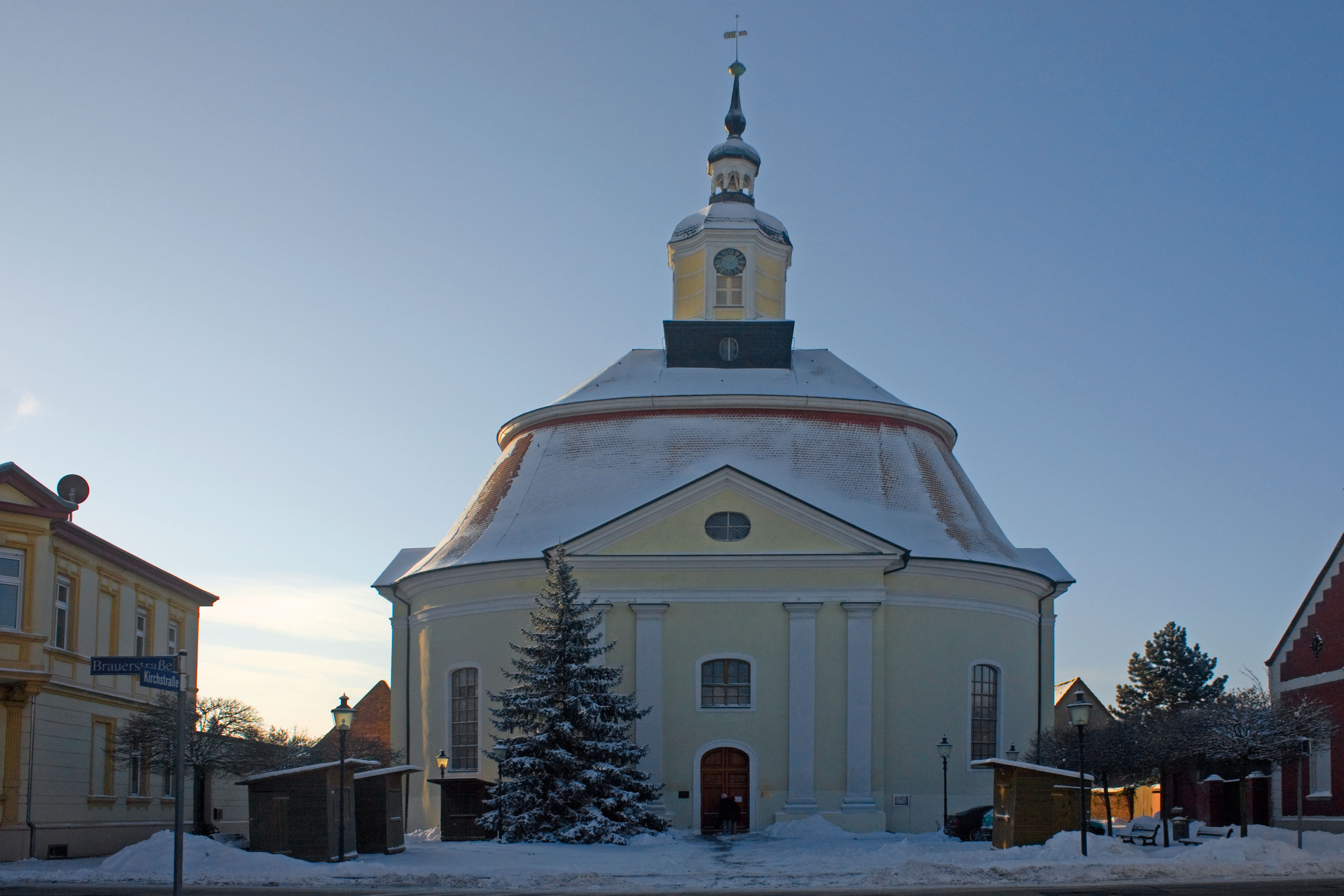
Church Oranienbaum

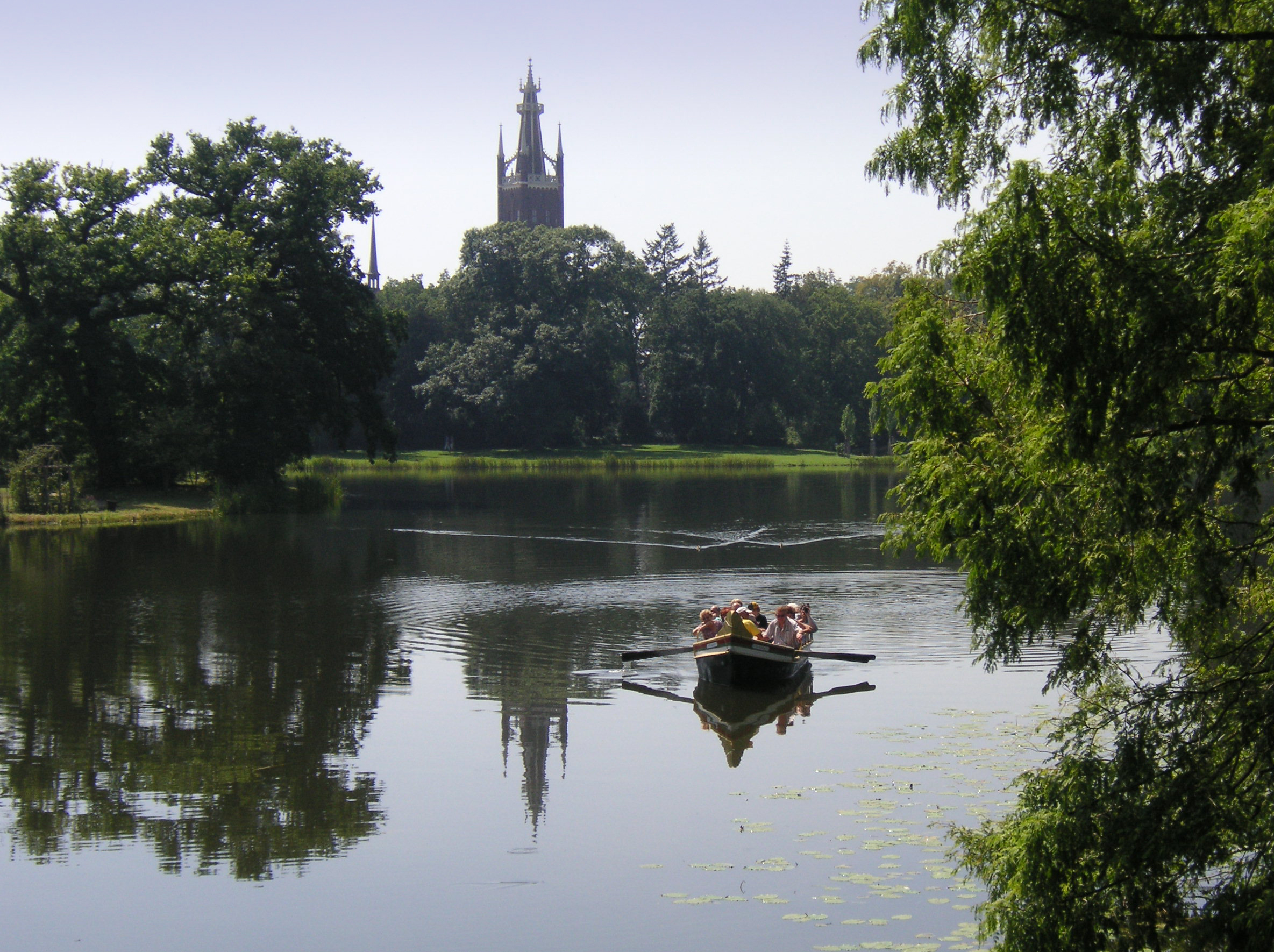
The Dessau-Wörlitz Garden Realm

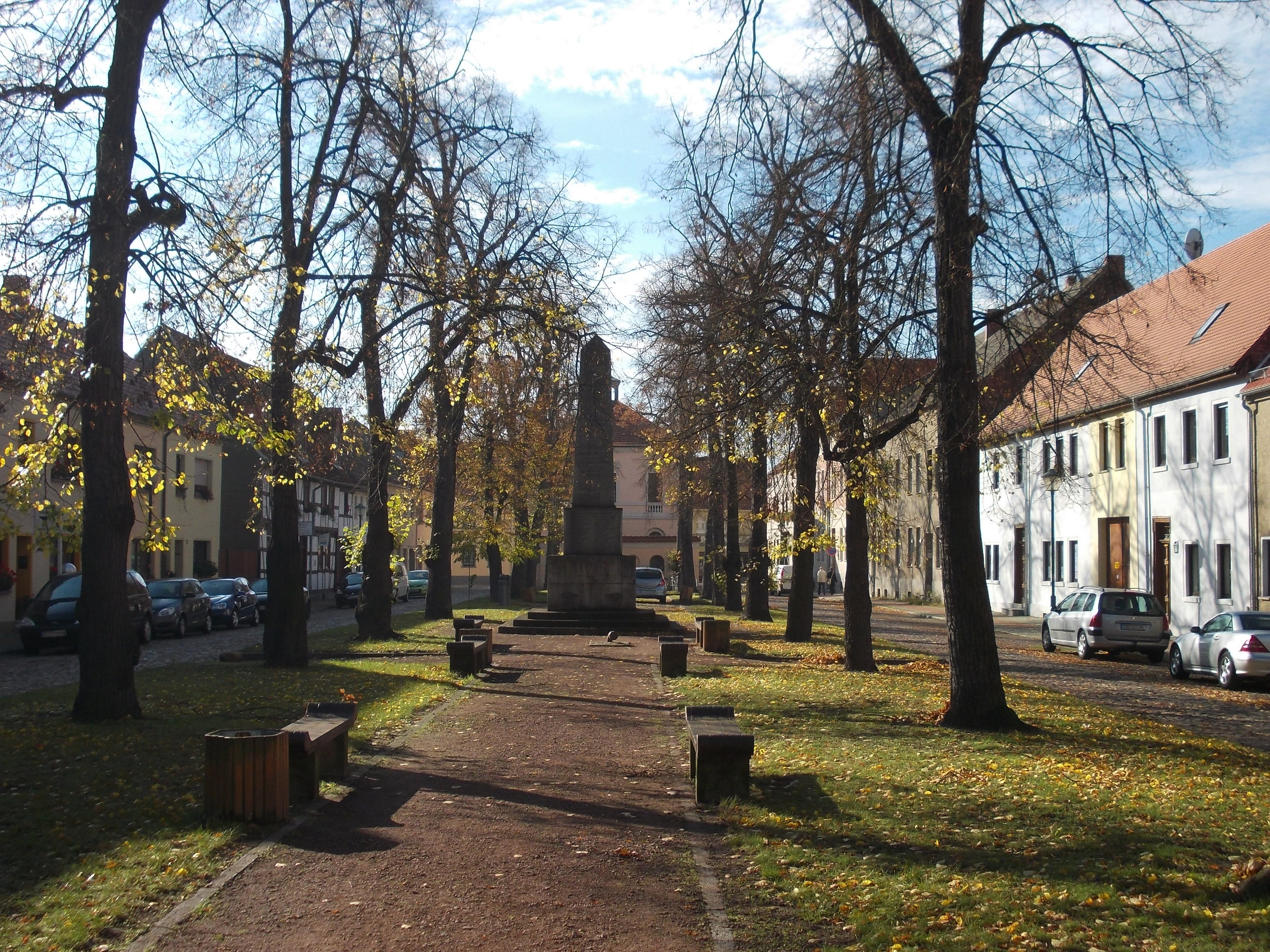
Wörlitz market square

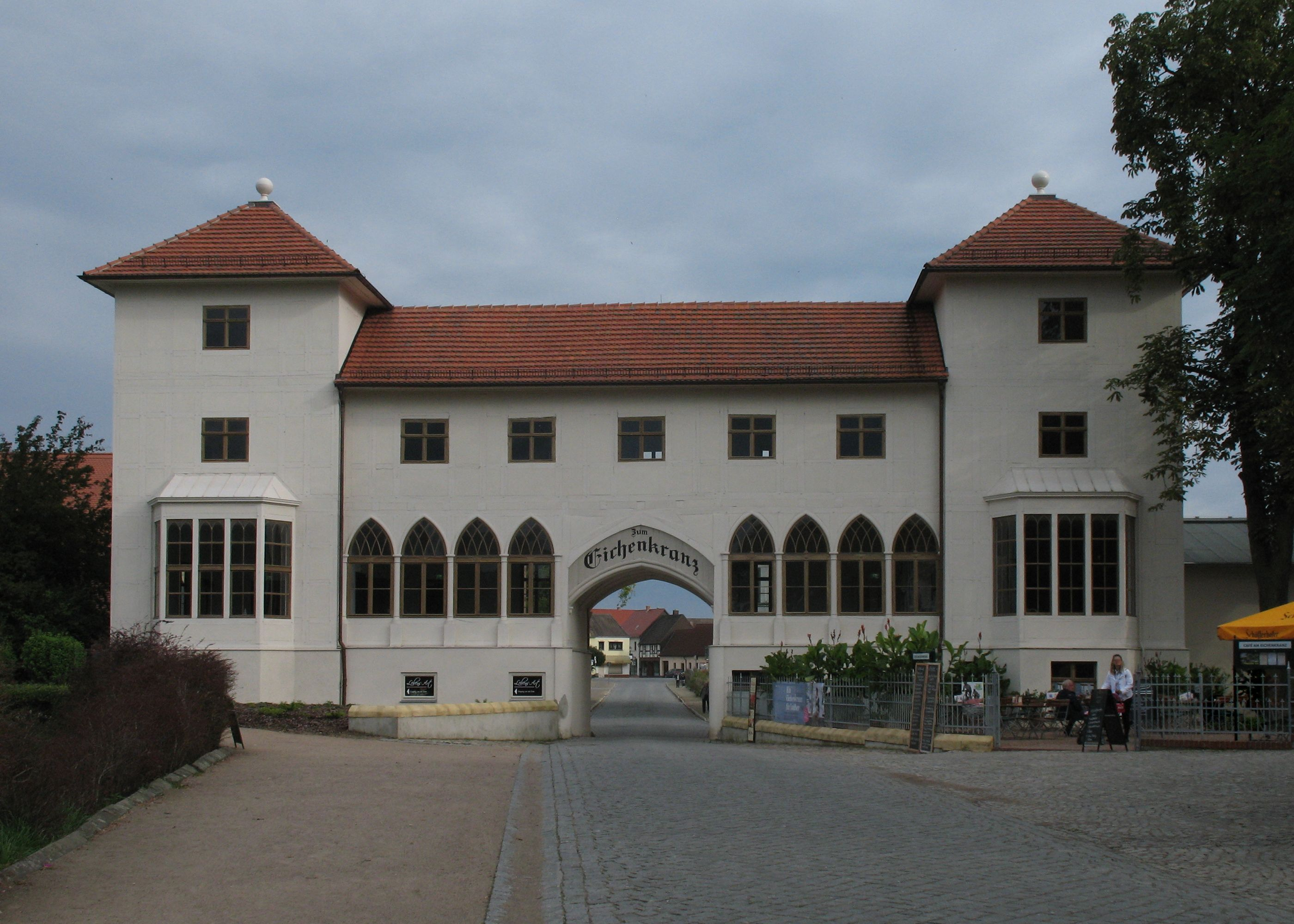
Historic Inn „Zum Eichenkranz“ in Wörlitz

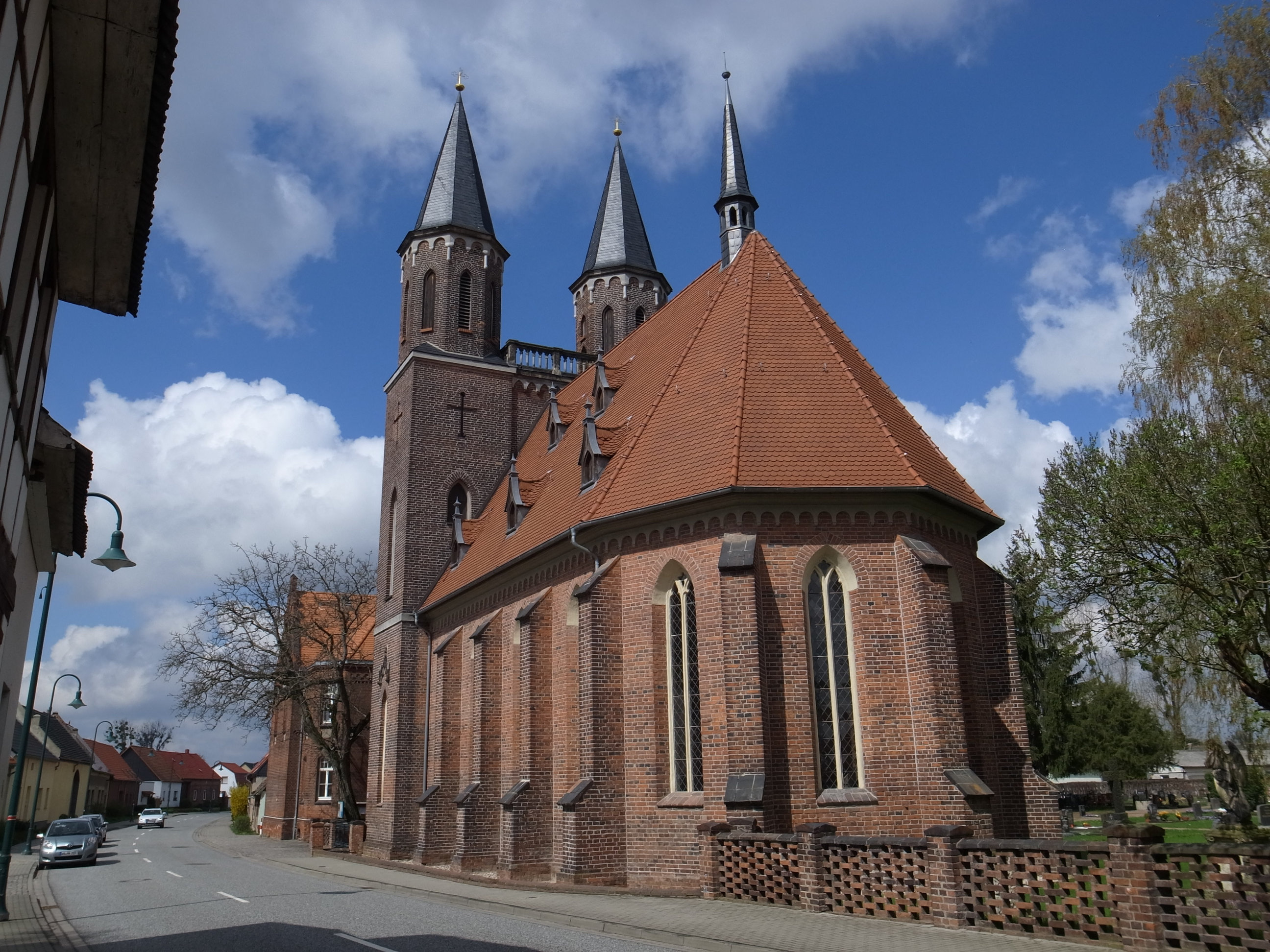
Church of Vockerode
