= Rehsen =

- Ortsteil of Oranienbaum-Wörlitz
- Interactive map of Rehsen
- Location within Germany Location within Saxony-Anhalt
- Coordinates: 51°49′N 12°30′E
- Country: Germany
- State: Saxony-Anhalt
- District: Wittenberg
- Town: Oranienbaum-Wörlitz

Area
  - Total: 7.86 km^{2} (3.03 sq mi)
- Elevation: 62 m (203 ft)

Population (2009-12-31)
  - Total: 260
  - Density: 33/km^{2} (86/sq mi)
- Time zone: UTC+01:00 (CET)
  - Summer (DST): UTC+02:00 (CEST)
- Postal codes: 06786
- Dialling codes: 034905
- Vehicle registration: WB

Rehsen (German pronunciation: [ˈʁeːzn̩]) is a village and a former municipality in the district of Wittenberg, Saxony-Anhalt, Germany. Since 1 January 2011, it is part of the town Oranienbaum-Wörlitz.
