= Oranienbaum, Germany =

Oranienbaum
- Ortsteil of Oranienbaum-Wörlitz
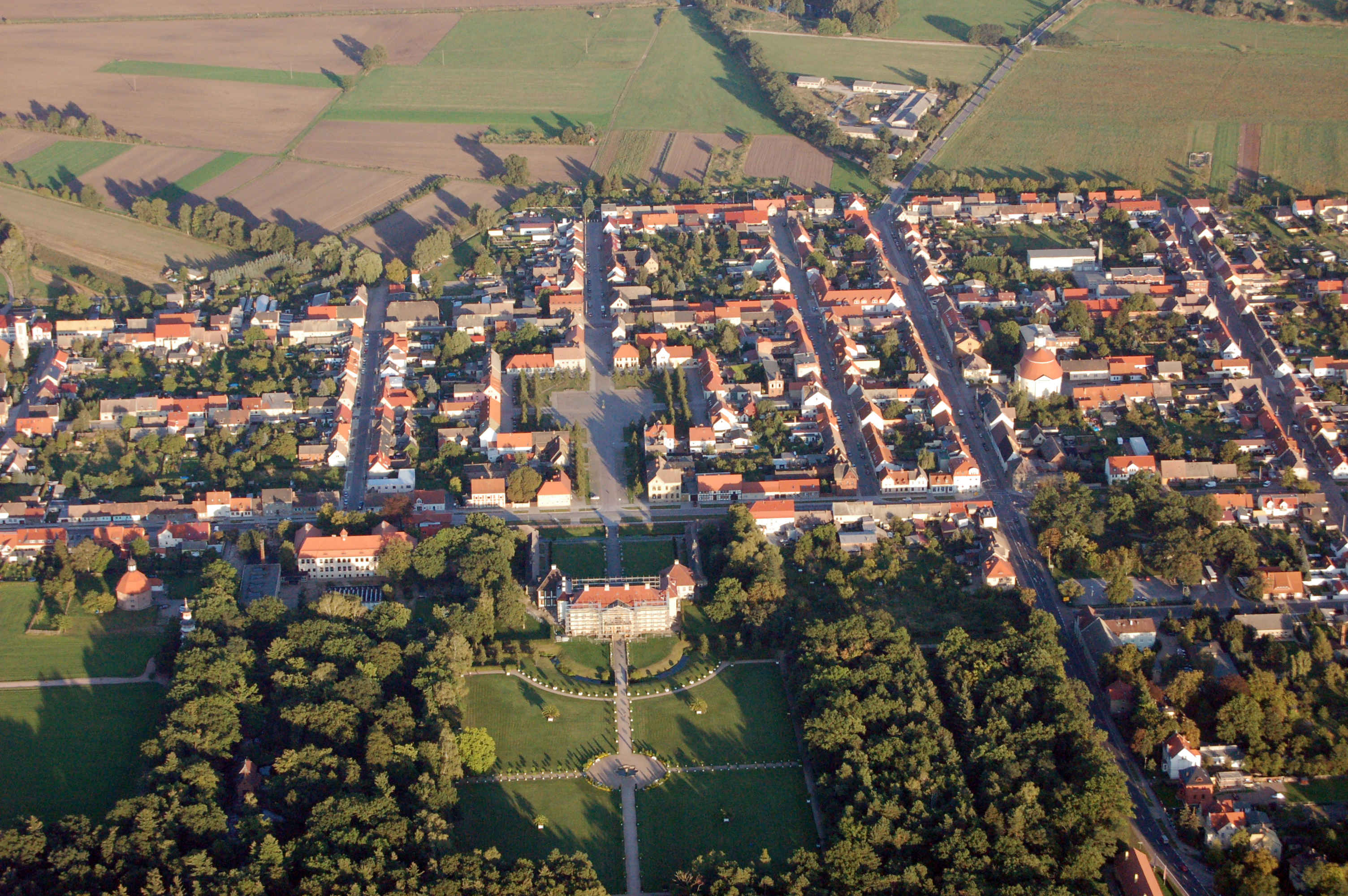
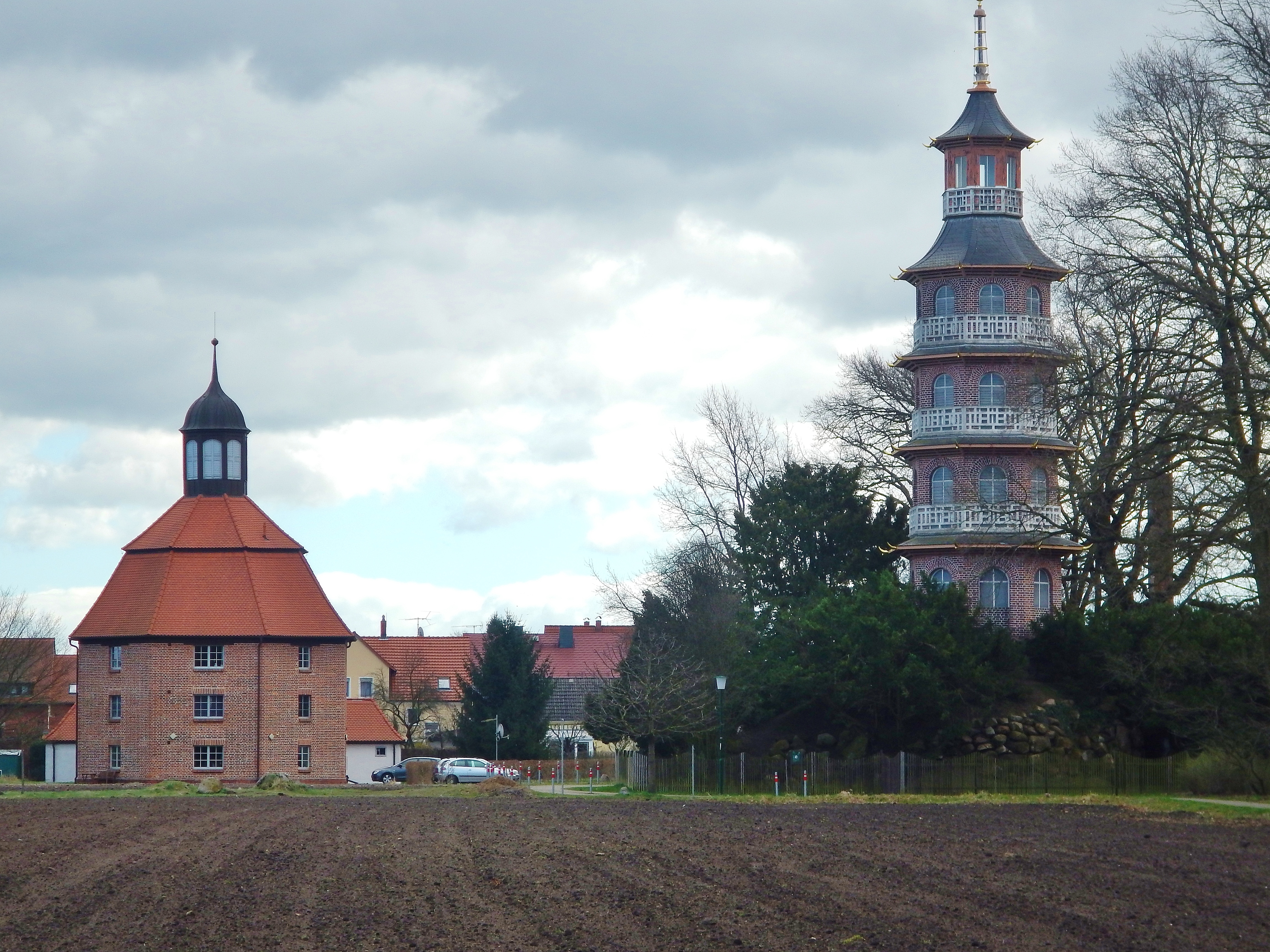
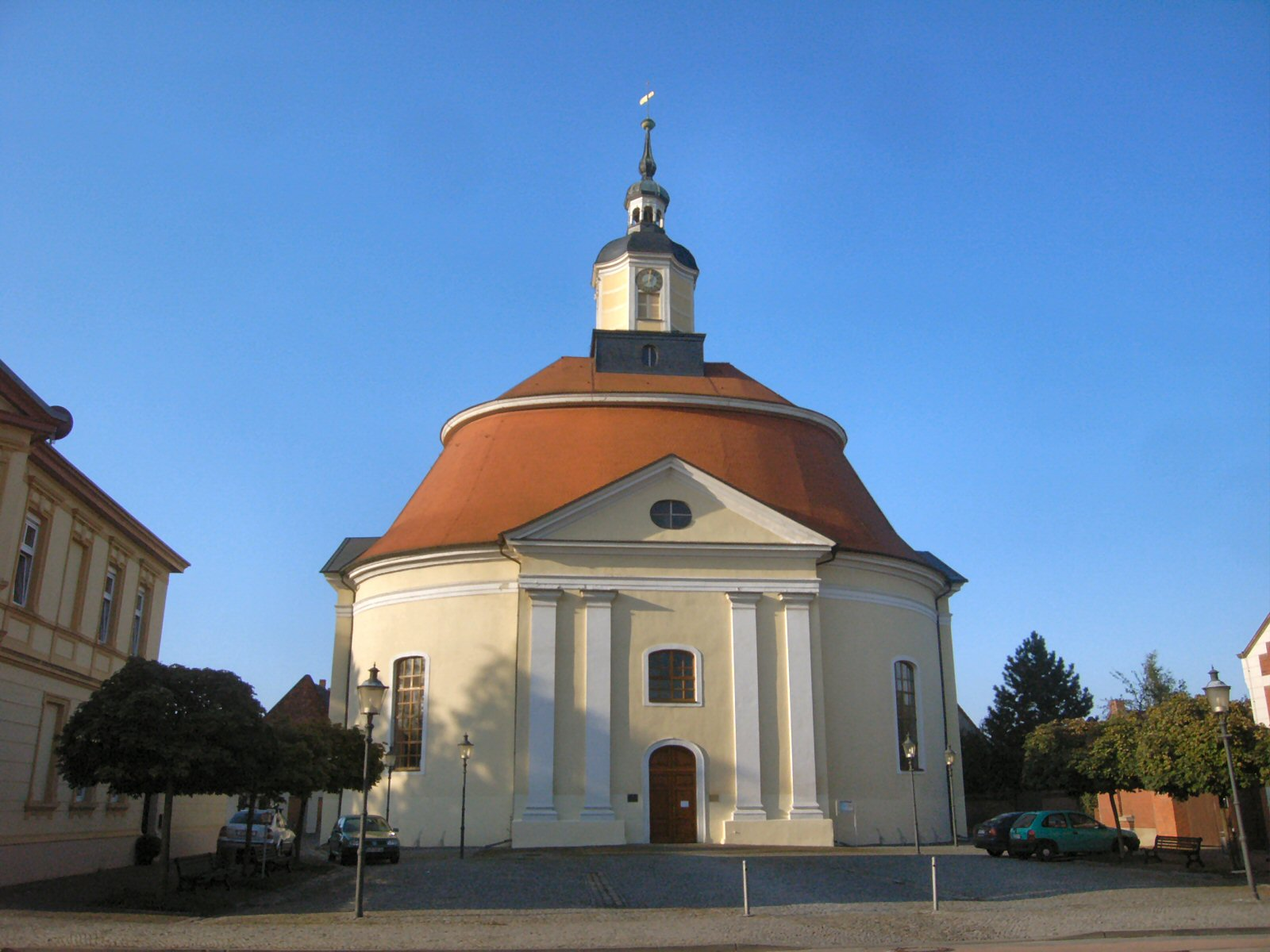
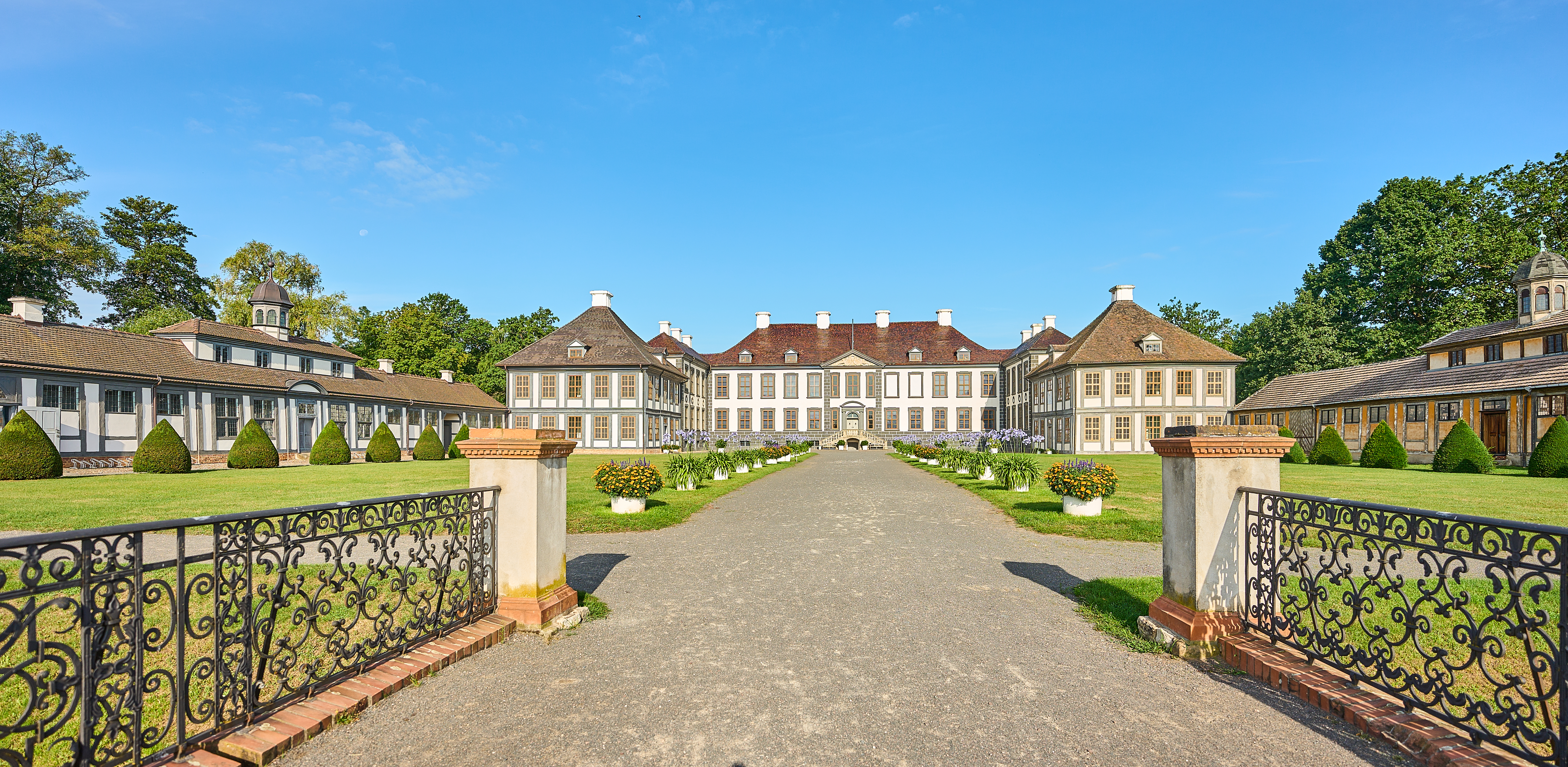
- Aerial view of Oranienbaum Little church and Pagoda City church Oranienbaum castle

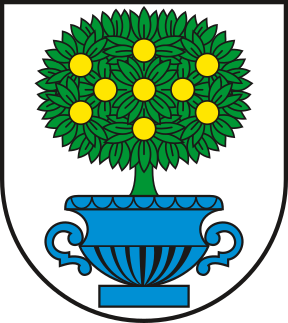
- Coat of arms
- Interactive map of Oranienbaum
- Location within Germany Location within Saxony-Anhalt
- Coordinates: 51°47′57″N 12°24′25″E
- Country: Germany
- State: Saxony-Anhalt
- District: Wittenberg
- Town: Oranienbaum-Wörlitz

Area
  - Total: 32.3 km^{2} (12.5 sq mi)
- Elevation: 64 m (210 ft)

Population (2009-12-31)
  - Total: 3,280
  - Density: 102/km^{2} (263/sq mi)
- Time zone: UTC+01:00 (CET)
  - Summer (DST): UTC+02:00 (CEST)
- Postal codes: 06785
- Dialling codes: 034904
- Vehicle registration: WB
- Website: www.oranienbaum.de

Oranienbaum (German pronunciation: [oˈʁaːniənˌbaʊm]) is a former town and a former municipality in the district of Wittenberg, in Saxony-Anhalt, Germany. Since 1 January 2011, it is a District (German: Ortsteil) of the town of Oranienbaum-Wörlitz. It is situated south of the Elbe, east of Dessau.

== History ==
Historical affiliations

Duchy of Saxony 1180–1212
County of Anhalt 1212–1218
Principality of Anhalt 1218–1252
Principality of Anhalt-Zerbst 1252–1396
Principality of Anhalt-Dessau 1396–1561
Anhalt-Dessau, ruled by Anhalt-Zerbst 1561–1603
Principality of Anhalt-Dessau 1603–1807
Duchy of Anhalt-Dessau 1807–1863
Duchy of Anhalt 1863–1918
Free State of Anhalt 1918–1933
Free State of Anhalt de jure, Gau Halle-Merseburg de facto, Nazi Germany 1933–1945
Saxony-Anhalt, (Allied-occupied Germany) Soviet occupation zone 1945–1949
Saxony-Anhalt, East Germany 1949–1952
Bezirk Halle, East Germany 1952–1990
Wittenberg (district), Saxony-Anhalt, Germany 1990–present

The former settlement of Nischwitz was renamed in 1673 after Countess Henriette Catherine of Nassau, a scion of the House of Orange-Nassau (Dutch: Oranje-Nassau) and princess consort of the then ruling Prince John George II of Anhalt-Dessau.

From 1683 on, the Countess had the Oranienbaum Palace erected according to plans by the Dutch architect Cornelis Ryckwaert. The parks are today included within the Dessau-Wörlitz Garden Realm, a UNESCO World Heritage Site since 2000.

Under Nazi Germany, Oranienbaum was the location of a forced labour subcamp of the prison in Coswig.

== Sights ==
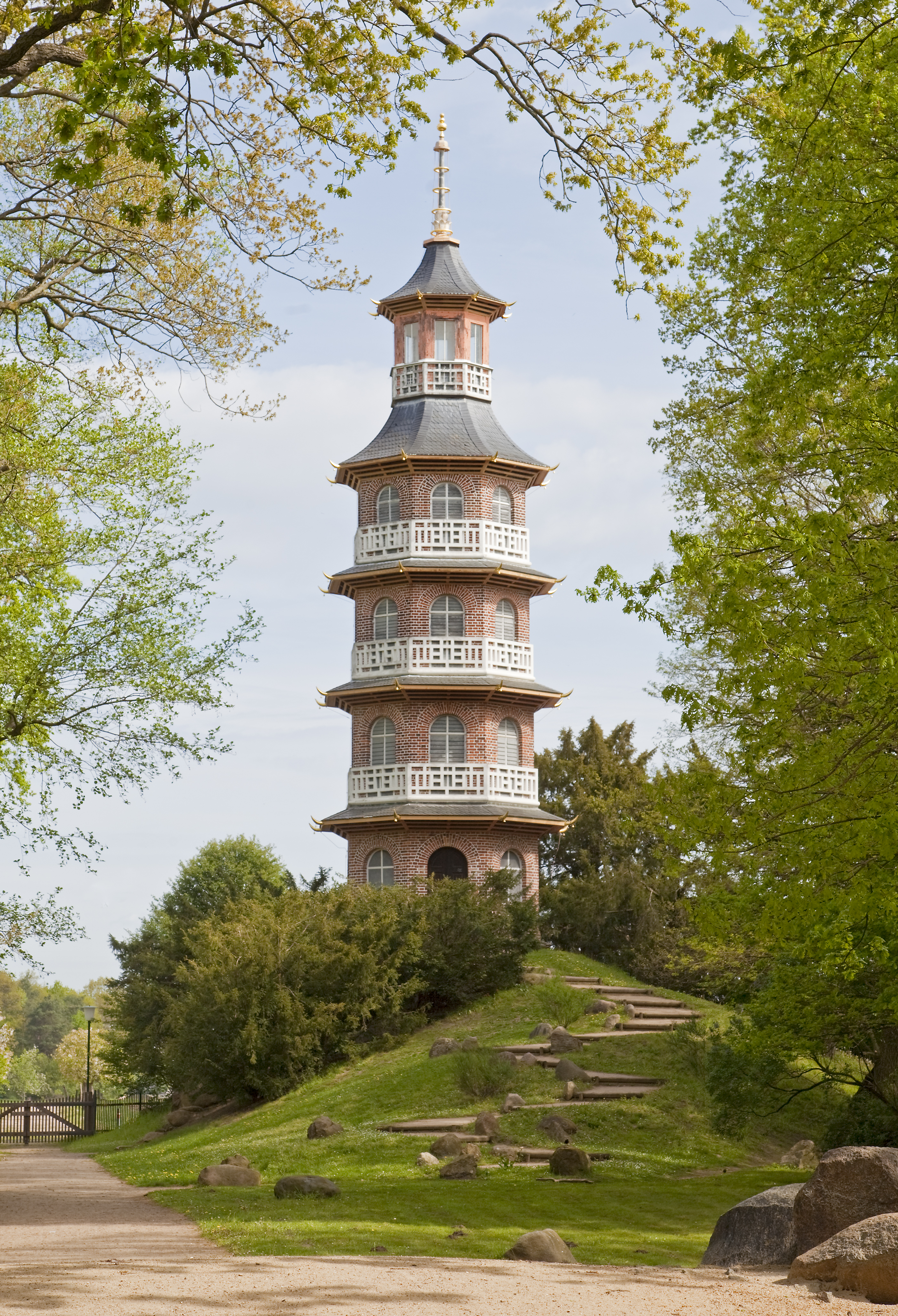
Pagoda

- Oranienbaum Palace, park and Chinese garden with a pagoda
- Baroque parish church, built in 1712
- Monument Path with 29 stations
- Historical market square
- Dutch architectural style of the 19th century

== International relations ==
- Daun, Germany

== See also ==
- Oranienburg
- Oranienbaum, Russia
