= Wörlitz =

- Ortsteil of Oranienbaum-Wörlitz
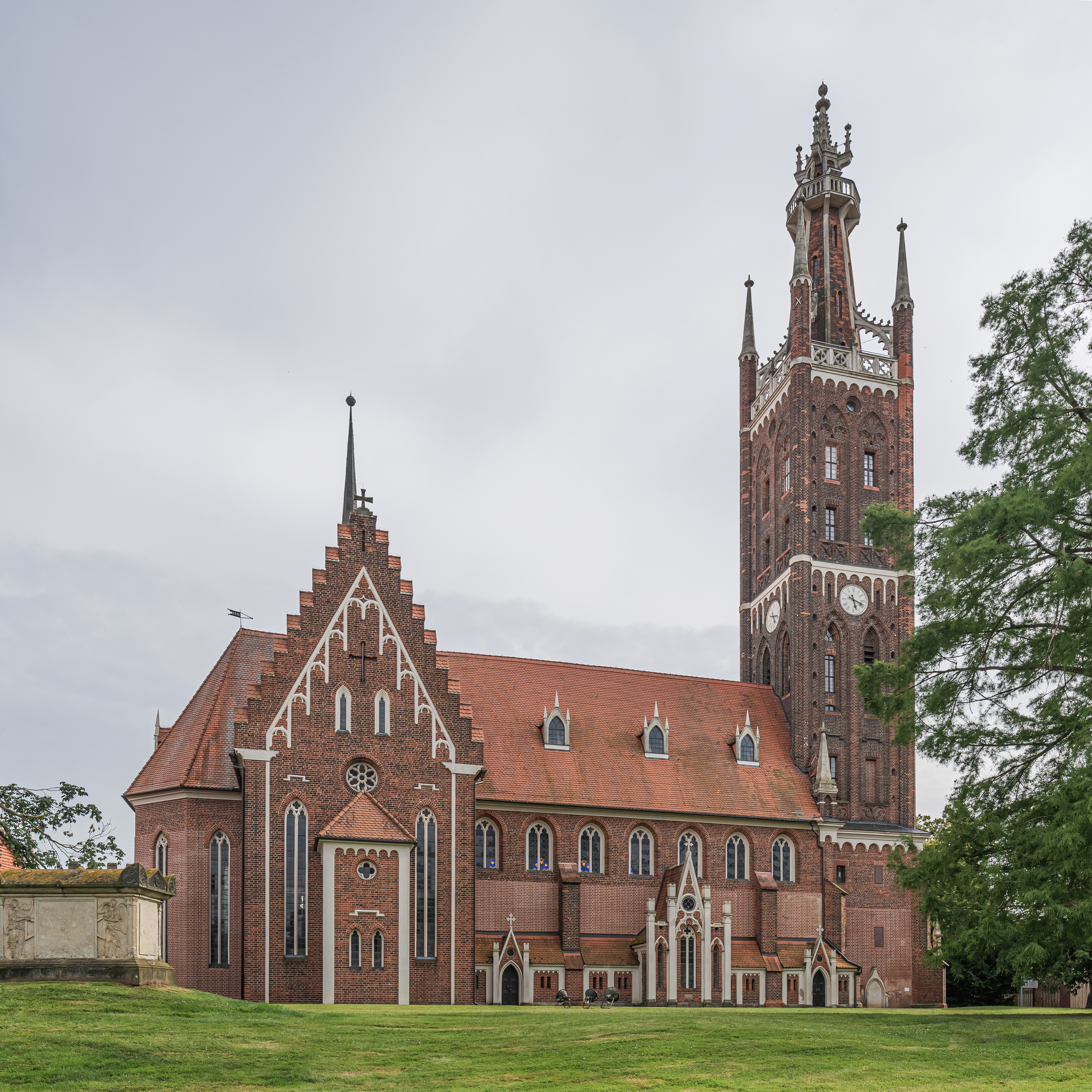
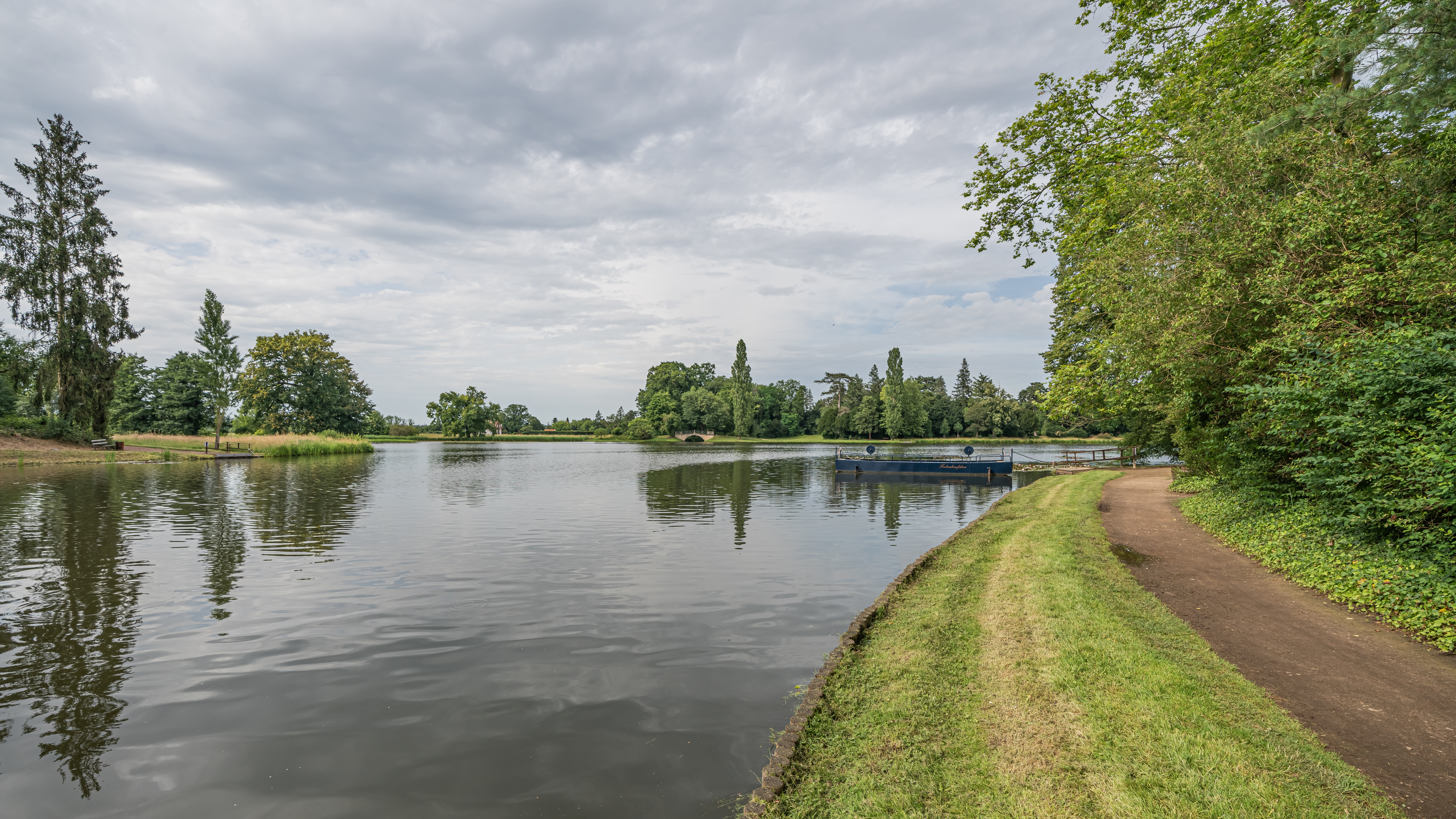
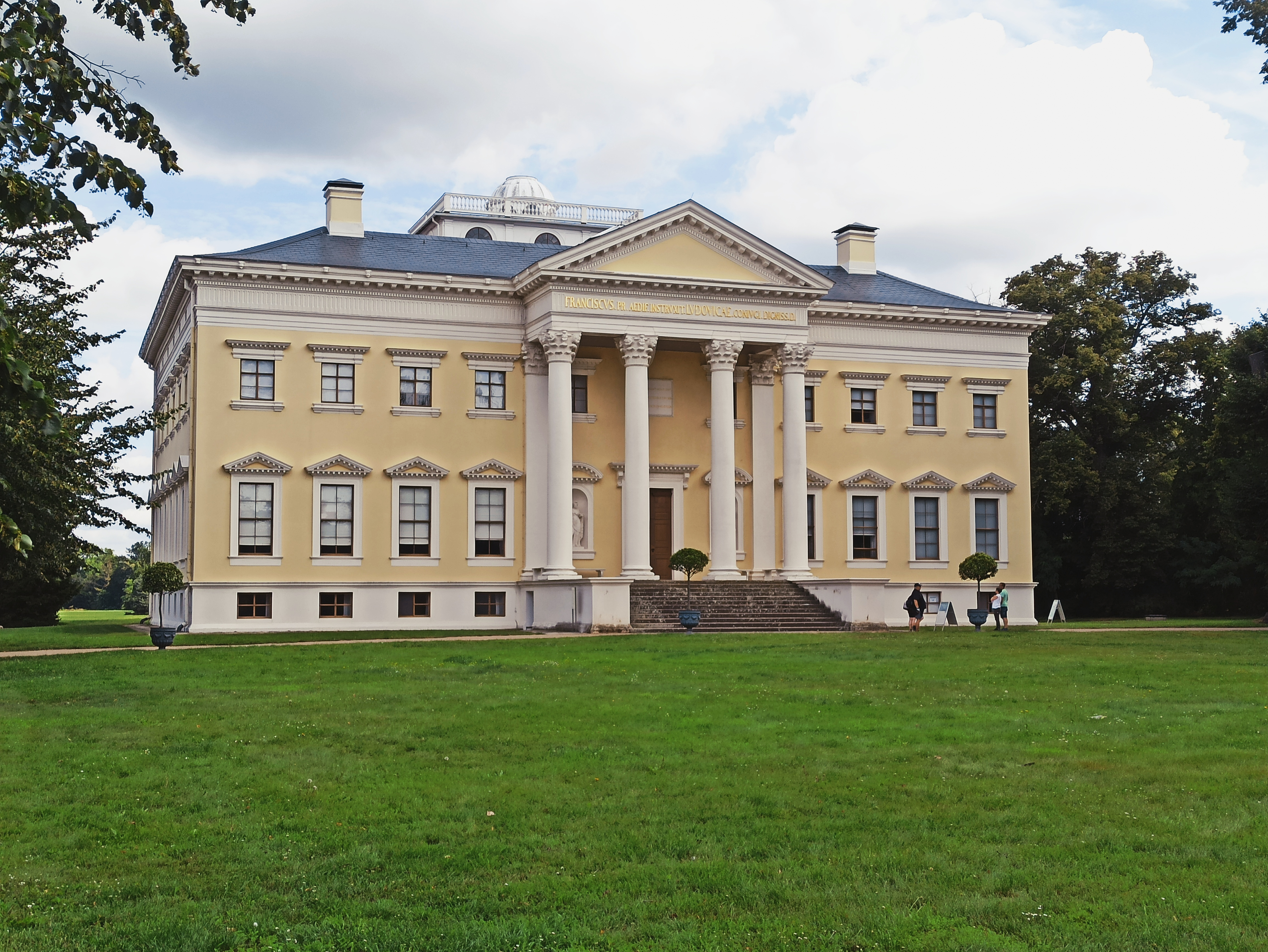
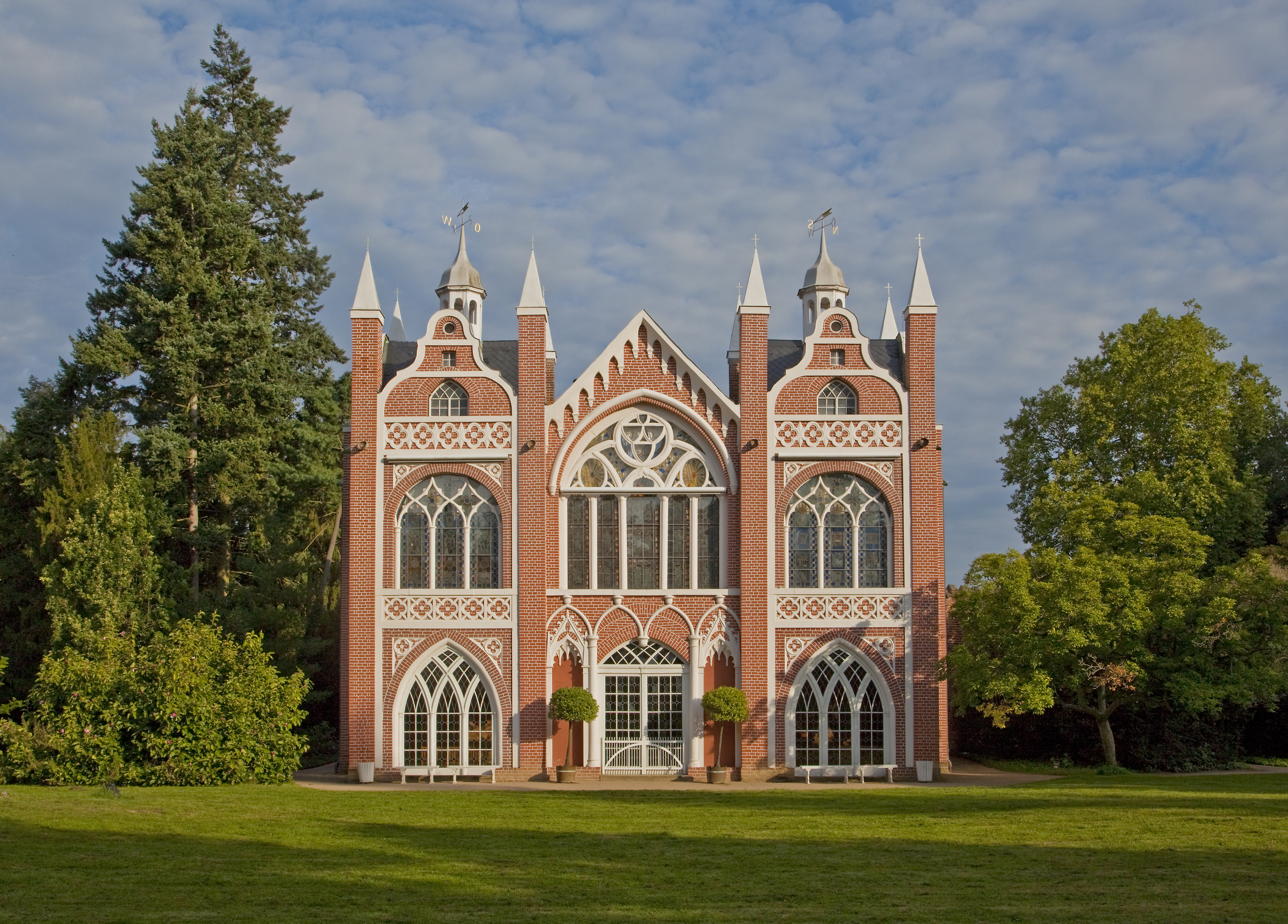
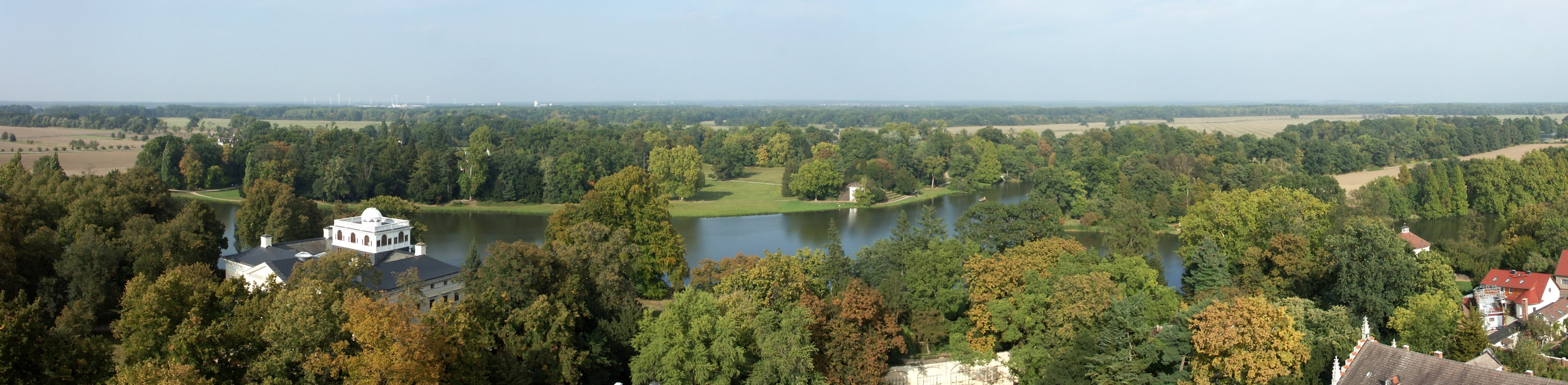
- St. Petri church Lake Wörlitz Wörlitz castle Gotisches Haus View over Dessau-Wörlitz Garden Realm

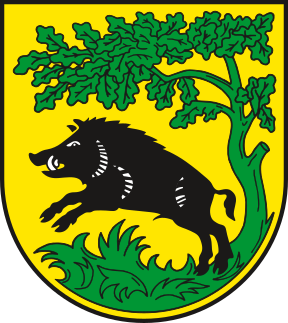
- Coat of arms
- Interactive map of Wörlitz
- Location within Germany Location within Saxony-Anhalt
- Coordinates: 51°51′N 12°25′E
- Country: Germany
- State: Saxony-Anhalt
- District: Wittenberg
- Town: Oranienbaum-Wörlitz

Area
  - Total: 28.05 km^{2} (10.83 sq mi)
- Elevation: 60 m (200 ft)

Population (2009-12-31)
  - Total: 1,513
  - Density: 53.94/km^{2} (139.7/sq mi)
- Time zone: UTC+01:00 (CET)
  - Summer (DST): UTC+02:00 (CEST)
- Postal codes: 06786
- Dialling codes: 034905
- Vehicle registration: WB

Wörlitz (German pronunciation: [ˈvœʁlɪts]) is a town and a former municipality in the district of Wittenberg, in Saxony-Anhalt, Germany. Since 1 January 2011, it has been part of the town Oranienbaum-Wörlitz. It is situated on the left bank of the Elbe, east of Dessau.

The historic parks of Wörlitz are included into the Dessau-Wörlitz Garden Realm, one of the World Heritage Sites, designated in 2000.
