= Riesigk =

- Ortsteil of Oranienbaum-Wörlitz
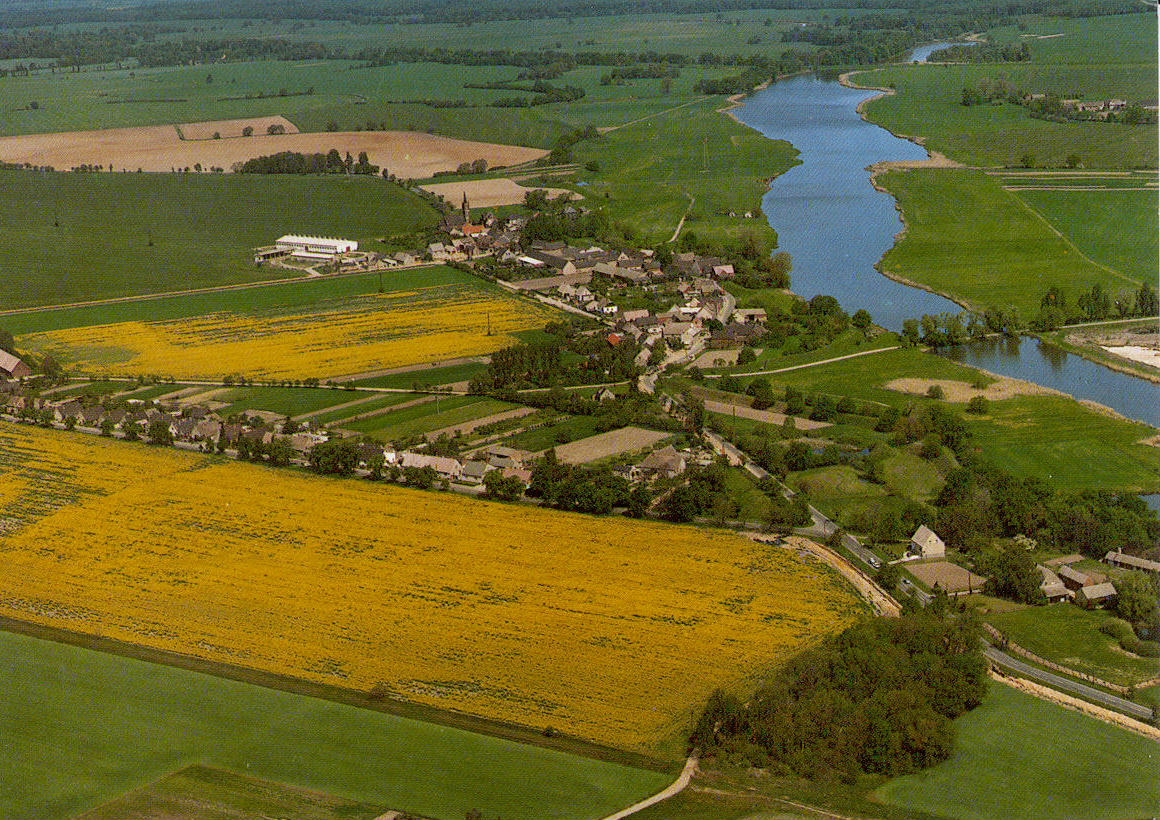
- Interactive map of Riesigk
- Location within Germany Location within Saxony-Anhalt
- Coordinates: 51°49′N 12°28′E
- Country: Germany
- State: Saxony-Anhalt
- District: Wittenberg
- Town: Oranienbaum-Wörlitz

Area
  - Total: 6.13 km^{2} (2.37 sq mi)
- Elevation: 62 m (203 ft)

Population (2014-12-31)
  - Total: 198
  - Density: 32.3/km^{2} (83.7/sq mi)
- Time zone: UTC+01:00 (CET)
  - Summer (DST): UTC+02:00 (CEST)
- Postal codes: 06785
- Dialling codes: 034905
- Vehicle registration: WB

Riesigk (German pronunciation: [ˈʁiːzɪk]) is a village and a former municipality in Germany not far from the town of Wittenberg in the district of Wittenberg, Saxony-Anhalt, on the south side of the Elbe river. Since 1 January 2011, it is part of the town Oranienbaum-Wörlitz. It has a population of about 198 (2014).

== History ==
The village was chartered in 1200, the first time with the name Riswig.

- 1603 : the area was attached as a part of Anhalt.
- 1797 - 1800 : the neogothic church was erected.

== Places of interest ==
- Church of Riesigk

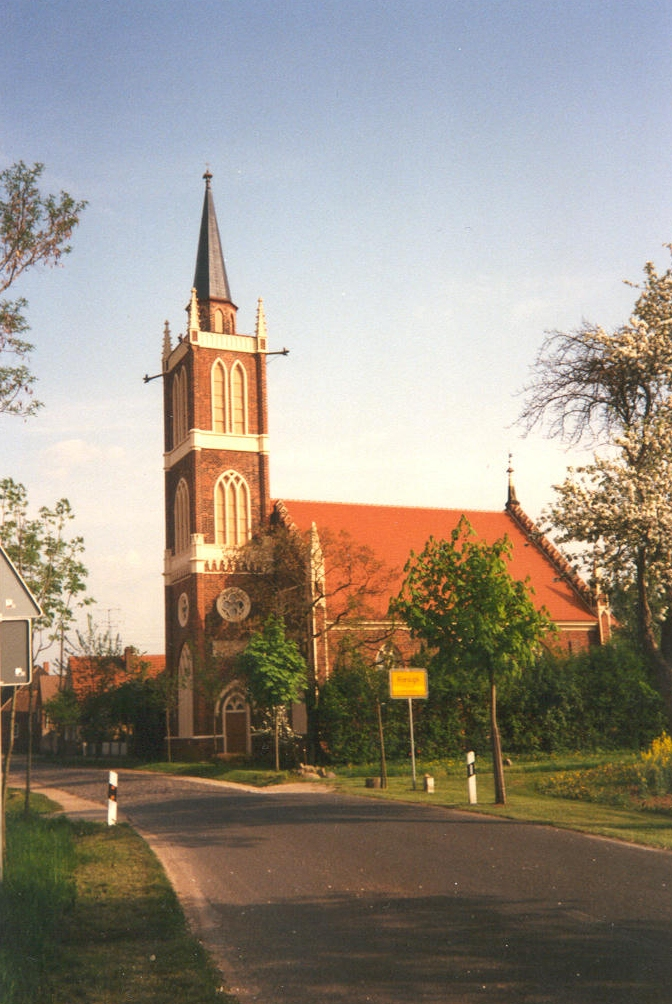
Church of Riesigk
