= Kemberg (Verwaltungsgemeinschaft) =

Community in Wittenberg, Saxony-Anhalt, Germany

Coordinates: 51.783°N 12.633°E

Kemberg was a Verwaltungsgemeinschaft ("administrative community") in the district of Wittenberg, in Saxony-Anhalt, Germany. The seat of the Verwaltungsgemeinschaft was Kemberg. It was disbanded on 1 January 2010.

The Verwaltungsgemeinschaft of Kemberg consisted of the following municipalities (population in 2005 in brackets):

- Dabrun (686)
- Eutzsch (658)
- Kemberg * (4,784)
- Rackith (682)
- Radis (1,354)
- Rotta (892)
- Schleesen (537)
- Selbitz (410)
- Uthausen (212)
- Wartenburg (824)
