= Bergwitz =

- Ortsteil of Kemberg
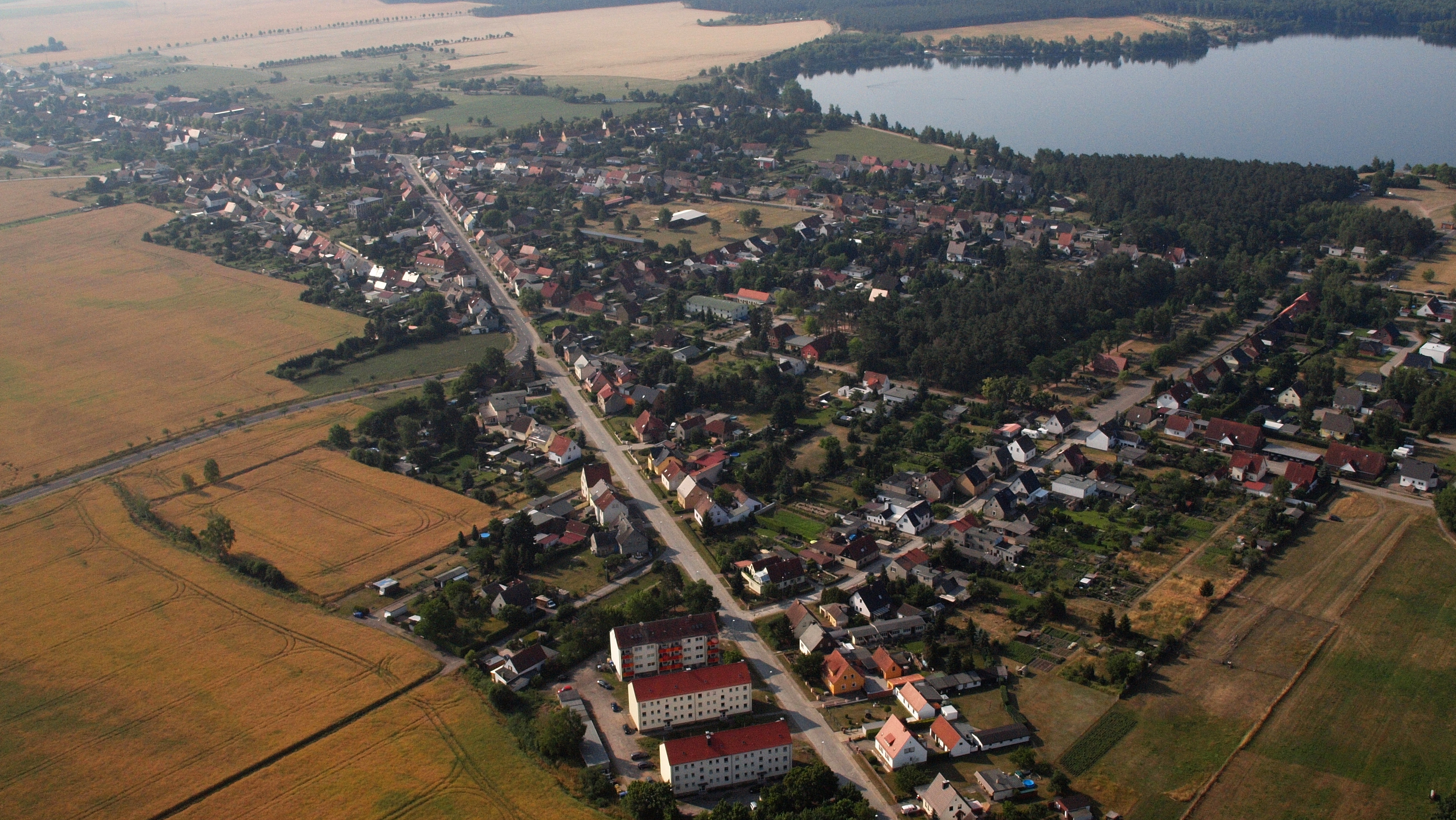
- Bergwitz from air, 2015
- Interactive map of Bergwitz
- Location within Germany Location within Saxony-Anhalt
- Coordinates: 51°47′N 12°35′E
- Country: Germany
- State: Saxony-Anhalt
- District: Wittenberg
- Town: Kemberg
- Elevation: 69 m (226 ft)

Population (2011)
  - Total: 1,310
- Time zone: UTC+01:00 (CET)
  - Summer (DST): UTC+02:00 (CEST)
- Postal codes: 06901
- Dialling codes: 034921
- Website: www.kemberg.de

Bergwitz is a village and a former municipality in Wittenberg district in Saxony-Anhalt, Germany. Since 1 July 2005 it is part of the town Kemberg. Bergwitz is known regionally for the Bergwitzsee (Bergwitz lake) as a tourist recreation area.

== Geography ==
Bergwitz is located on the edge of the Düben Heath, about 15 kilometers from Lutherstadt Wittenberg and 60 kilometers from Leipzig and Halle (Saale).

== History ==
The area was already settled in the Bronze Age about 3000 years ago.

On 1 July 2005, the municipality of Bergwitz with its subdivision of Klitzschena, was amalgamated with Kemberg.

== Main sights ==
Bergwitz is well known for its lake.

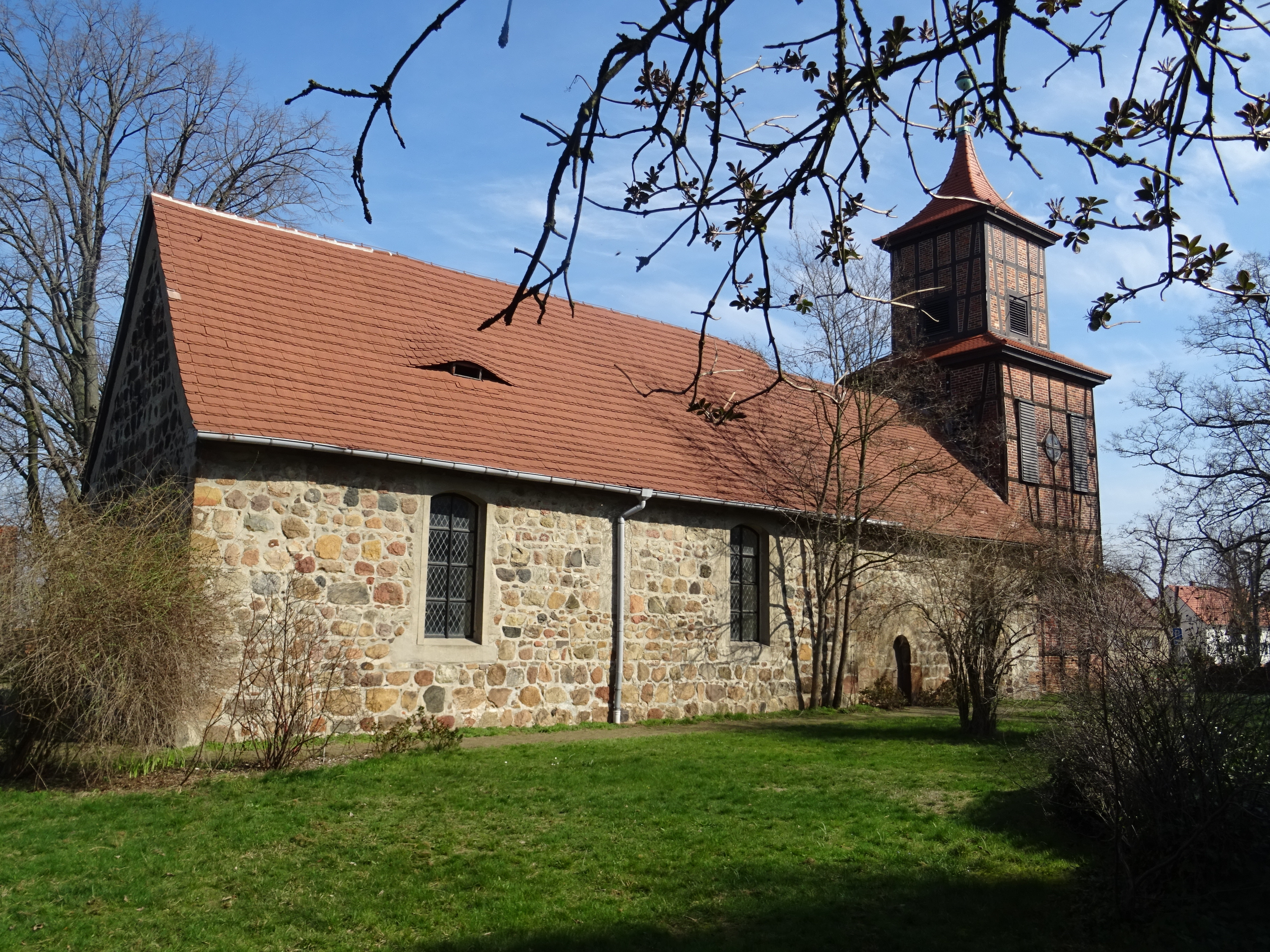
Church in Bergwitz

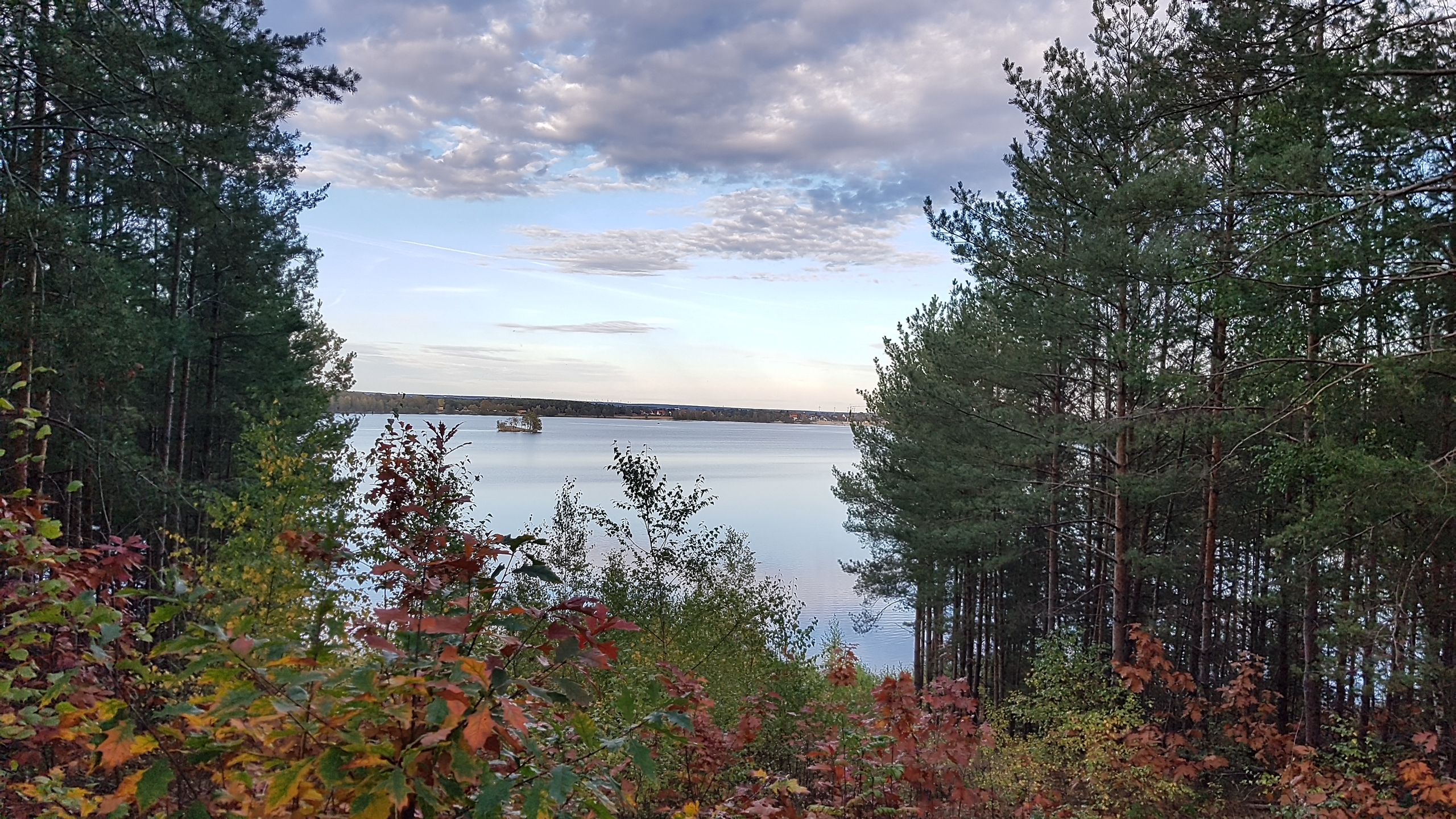
Bergwitz lake with Bergwitz in the background

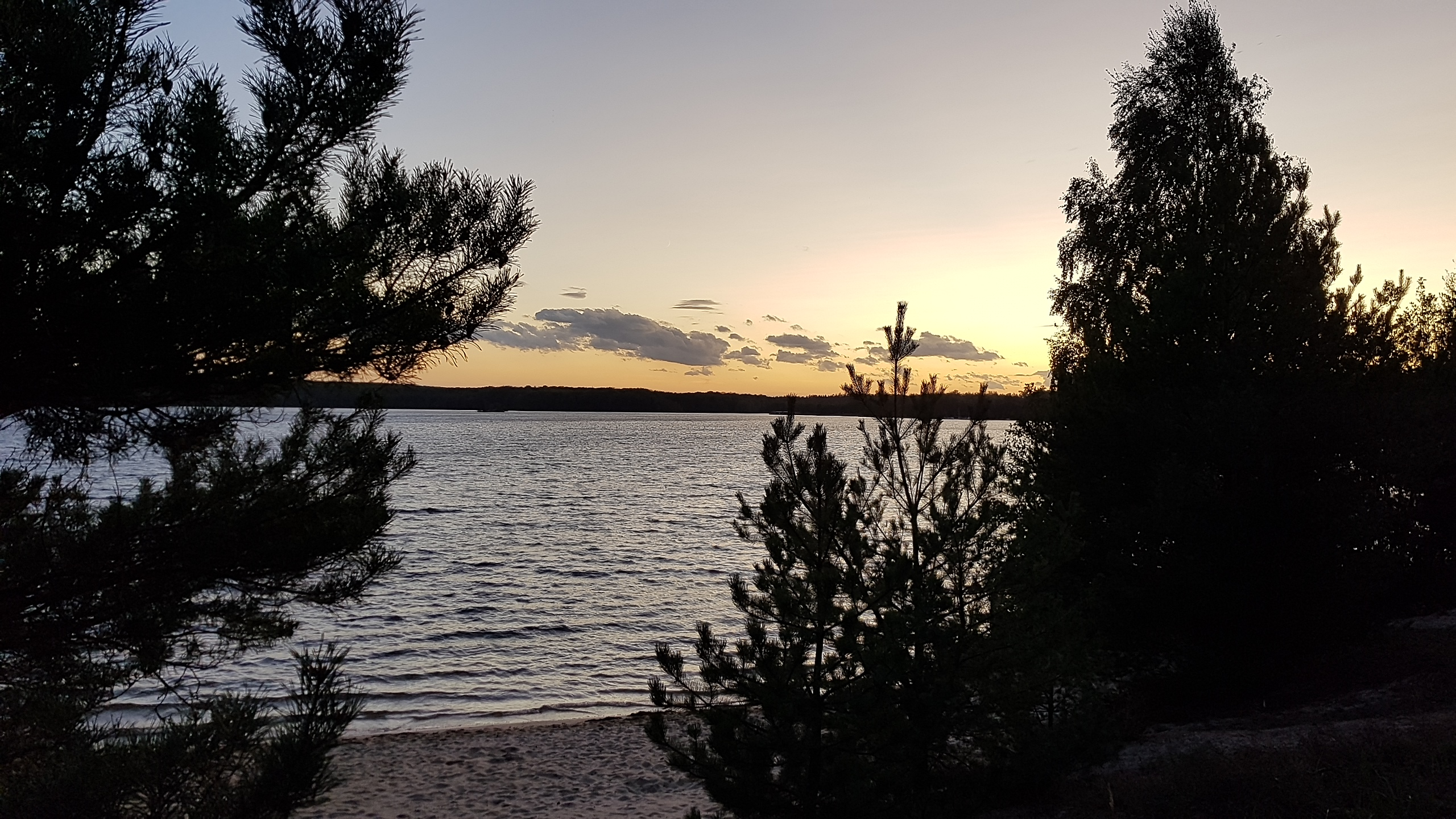
Bergwitz lake

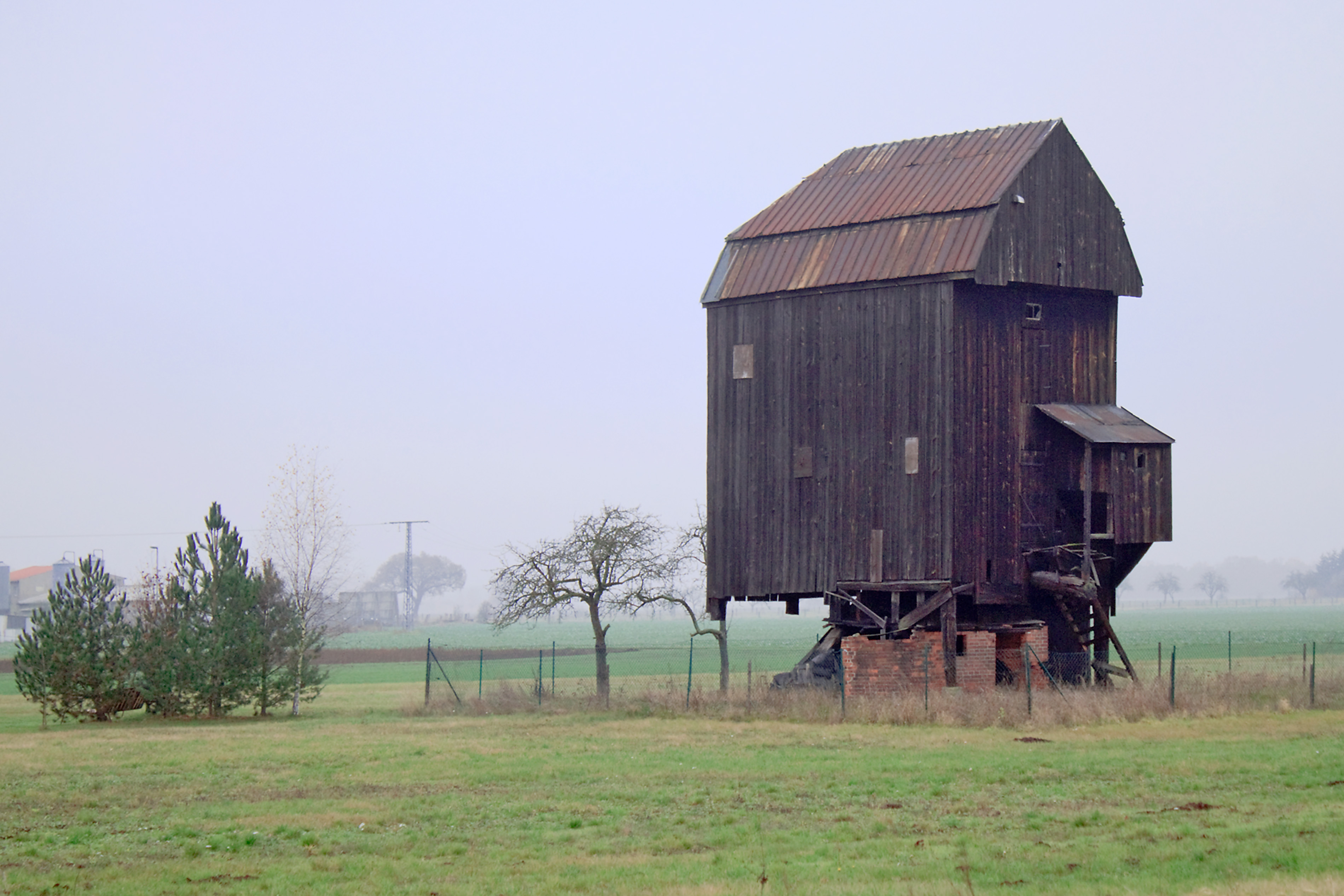
Bergwitz post mill

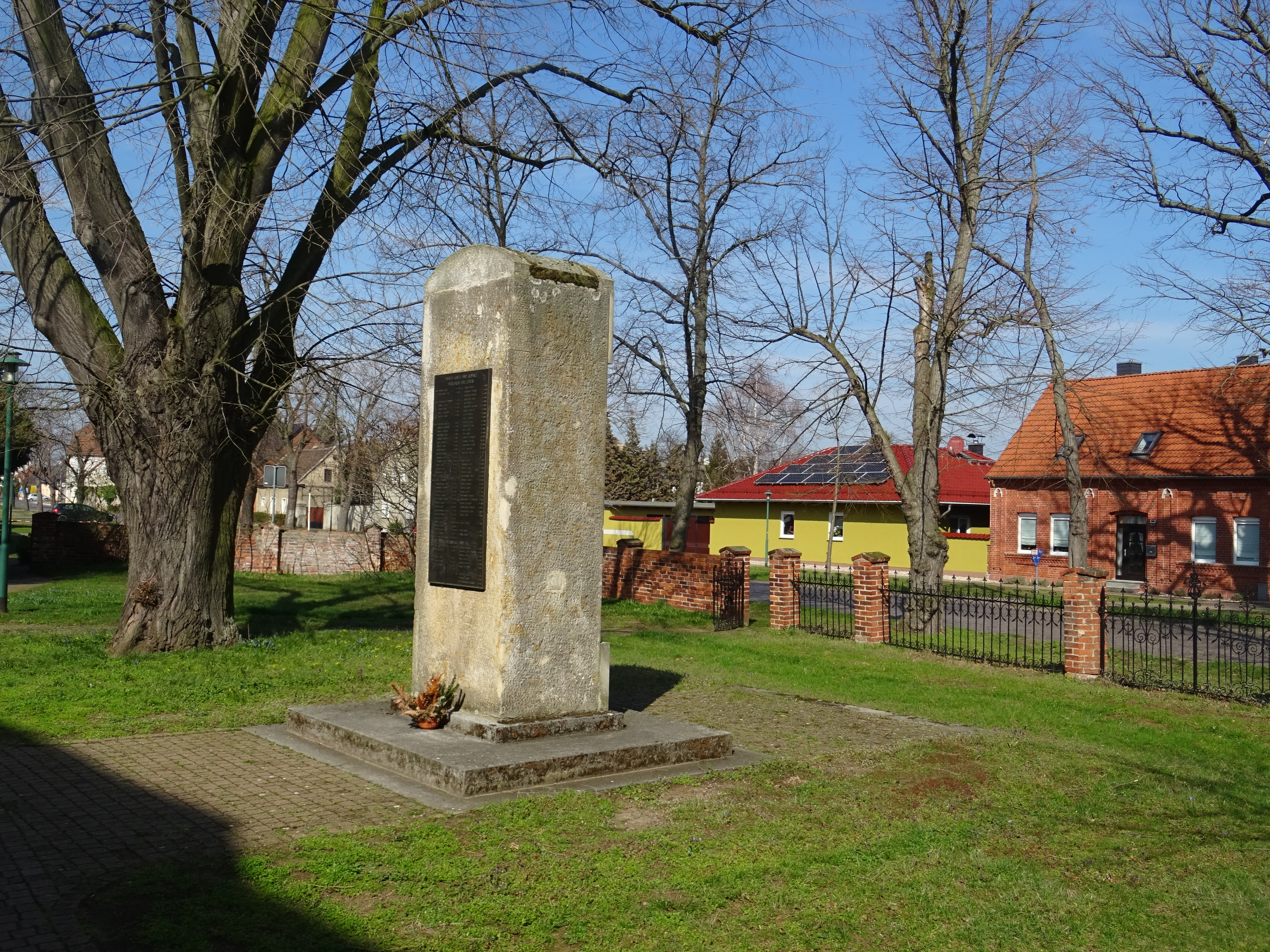
Bergwitz war memorial

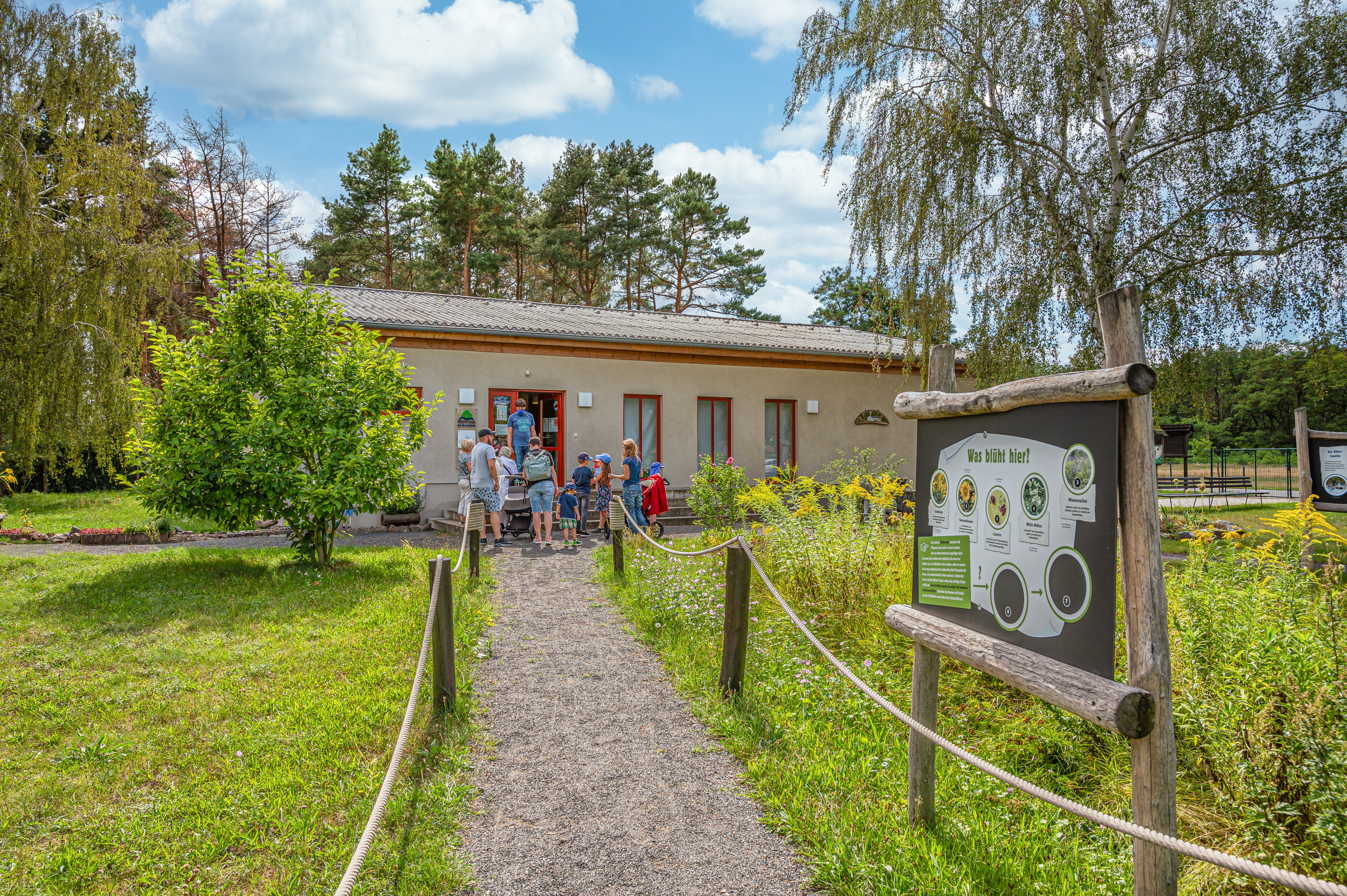
Waldhaus (Forest House)

== Transport ==
Bergwitz lies on Federal Highway (Bundesstraße) B 100 from Lutherstadt Wittenberg via Bitterfeld to Halle (Saale) and on Landesstraße L129 from Selbitz to Kemberg. Klitzschena lies on district road K2041 from Bergwitz to Seegrehna. Bundesautobahn 9 (Munich - Berlin) can be reached by the Dessau Ost or Vockerode interchange 22 km away.

Bergwitz railway station lies on the Deutsche Bahn line between Wittenberg and Leipzig/ Halle. It is part of Mitteldeutscher Verkehrsverbund. From 1903 to 1951, there was a railway connection between Bergwitz and Kemberg. The former station has been demolished.
