= Selbitz (disambiguation) =

Selbitz is a town in the district of Hof, in Bavaria, Germany.

Other places and rivers named Selbitz are:

- Selbitz (Kemberg), a village, part of the town Kemberg, Saxony-Anhalt, Germany
- Selbitz (river), a river in Bavaria and Thuringia, Germany.
