= Ernestine Christine Reiske =

German translator (1735–1798)

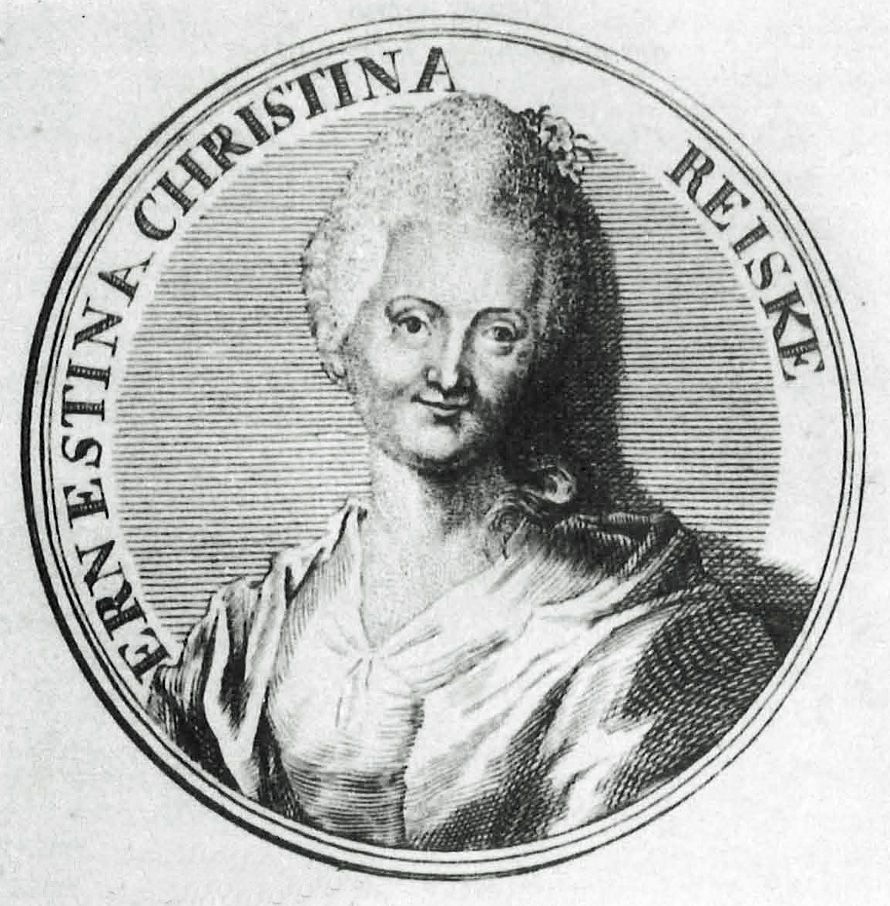
Ernestine Christine Reiske

Ernestine Christine Reiske (2 April 1735 – 27 July 1798) was a German classicist.

== Biography ==
Ernestine Christine Reiske was born as Ernestine Christine Müller on 2 April 1735 at Kemberg in Wittenberg district, Saxony-Anhalt, Germany. She was educated by her father and, after his death, by her older brother Gottlieb, while also reading about philosophy, genealogy, and learning the piano. After Gottlieb's marriage in 1755, Reiske focused on supporting herself and her mother in Leipzig. There she was admitted to the Gesellschaft der freien Künste und Wissenschaft in Leipzig, through which she came to know the author and linguist Johann Christoph Gottsched, as well as her future husband Johann Jakob Reiske, the rector of the Nikolaischule in Leipzig whose intellectual interests focused on Arabic philology and numismatics.

Their marriage took place on 23 July 1764. Thereafter Reiske was taught the classical languages by her husband and helped him with the collation of manuscripts and the correction of his works for the press. Reiske continued such work after her husband's death in 1774, bringing to completion their series Oratores Graeci (1770-1775) and editions of authors such as Dio Chrysostom (1784) and Libanius (1784; 1791-1797). She also published her own edition of Libanius (1775) and her husband's autobiography, as well as original works of her own like Hellas (1778) and Zur Moral (1782). Her philological work was praised by Lessing, with whom she maintained a close correspondence, in addition to that with other scholars such as Johann Joachim Eschenburg, Friedrich Nicolai, and Gottlieb Christoph Harless.

Reiske initially secured her finances after her husband's death by the shrewd sale of his collection of Arabic manuscripts. In 1781 she also rented estates around Bornum am Elm and operated them in partnership with her adopted son, Moritz von Egidy. She died in Kemberg on 27 July 1798.
