= Wilhelm Traugott Krug =

German philosopher and writer (1770–1842)

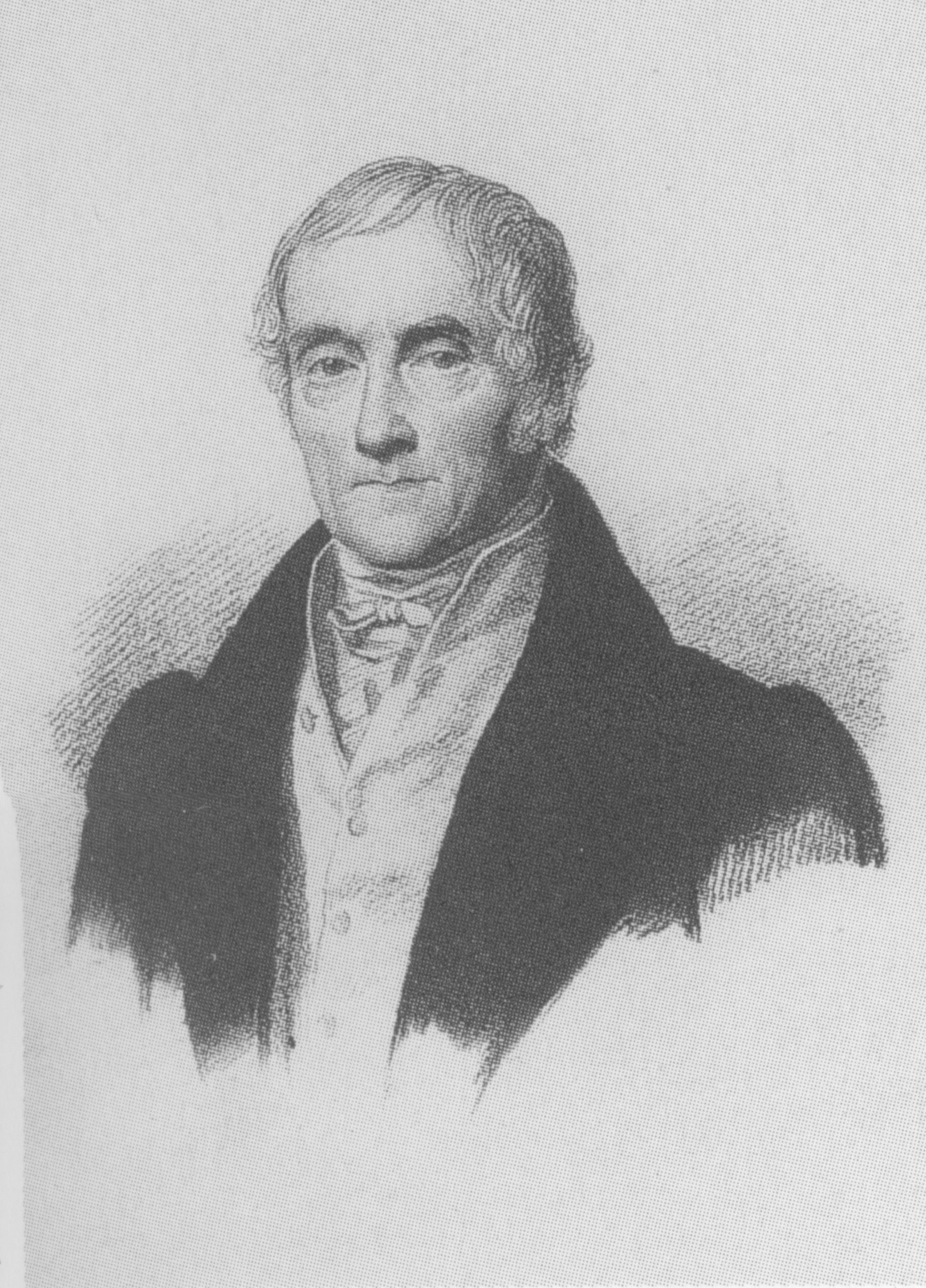
Wilhelm Traugott Krug

Wilhelm Traugott Krug (22 June 1770 – 12 January 1842) was a German philosopher and writer. He is considered to be part of the Kantian school of logic.

== Life ==
Krug was born on June 22, 1770 in Radis near Wittenberg to a farming family. He studied at the University of Wittenberg under Franz Volkmar Reinhard and Karl Gottfried Jehnichen, at the University of Jena under Karl Leonhard Reinhold, and at the University of Göttingen. After finishing his studies, he was employed as an adjunct professor at the University of Wittenberg.

From 1801 to 1804, Krug was professor of philosophy at Frankfurt (Oder), after which he succeeded Immanuel Kant in the chair of logic and metaphysics at the University of Königsberg. From 1809 till his death he was professor of philosophy at the University of Leipzig. He fought in the War of Liberation (1813–14) as captain of mounted chasseurs. He became Kant's successor at the University of Königsberg after the faculty of philosophy elected him to Kant's chair of logic and metaphysics.

He died in Leipzig on January 12, 1842.

== Views ==
In philosophy, Krug's method was psychological; he attempted to explain the Ego by examining the nature of its reflection upon the facts of consciousness. Being is known to us only through its presentation in consciousness; consciousness only in its relation to Being. Both Being and Consciousness, however, are immediately known to us, as also the relation existing between them. By this Transcendental Synthesis he proposed to reconcile Realism and Idealism, and to destroy the traditional difficulty between transcendental, or pure, thought and things in themselves.

Krug challenged Schelling to deduce his quill or pen from German Idealism's Philosophy of Nature. It was part of his empiricist objections to the new idealist philosophy. In so doing, he challenged the thinking that particular, perceptually real things could be logically known from general concepts. It prompted Georg Wilhelm Friedrich Hegel to issue a critical response and forced him to deal with the issue of the knowledge of singulars.

Beiträge zur Geschichte der Philosophie des XIX. Jahrhunderts (1835–1838) contains criticisms of Hegel and Schelling.

Krug was a prolific writer on a great variety of subjects, excelling as a popularizer rather than as an original thinker. His work stimulated freedom of thought in religion and politics, and he was a firm supporter of Jewish emancipation.

== Personal life ==
In 1804, Krug married Wilhelmine von Zenge (1780–1852), the eldest daughter of a Prussian major-general. They had six children. Wilhelmine had previously been engaged to Heinrich von Kleist.

== Principal works ==
- Briefe über den neuesten Idealism. Eine Fortsetzung der Briefe über die Wissenschaftslehre (1801)
- Entwurf eines neuen Organon's der Philosophie oder Versuch über die Principien der philosophischen Erkenntniss (1801)
- Fundamentalphilosophie (1803)
- System der theoretischen Philosophie (1806–1810):
  - Denklehre oder Logik (1806)
  - Erkenntnisslehre oder Metaphysik (1808)
  - Geschmackslehre oder Aesthetik (1810)
- Geschichte der Philosophie alter Zeit, vornehmlich unter Griechen und Römern (1815; 2nd ed., 1825)
- System der praktischen Philosophie (1817–1819):
  - Dikäologie oder philosophische Rechtslehre (1817)
  - Aretologie oder philosophische Tugendlehre (1818)
  - Eusebiologie oder philosophische Religionslehre (1819)
- Handbuch der Philosophie und der philosophischen Literatur (1820-1821; 3rd ed., 1828)
- Meine Lebensreise (1825, 2nd ed., 1842), autobiography
- Allgemeines Handwörterbuch der philosophischen Wissenschaften (1827-1834; 2nd ed., 1832-1838)
- Gesammelte Schriften (1830-1841; Collected works in 12 volumes):
  - 1-2: Theologische Schriften (1830)
  - 3-6: Politische und juridische Schriften (1834-1836)
  - 7-9: Philosophische Schriften (1839)
  - 10-12: Enzyklopädische und vermischte Schriften (1841)
- Universalphilosophische Vorlesungen für Gebildete beiderlei Geschlechts (1831)
- Beiträge zur Geschichte der Philosophie des XIX. Jahrhunderts (1835-1838):
  - Schelling und Hegel oder die neueste Philosophie im Vernichtungskriege mit sich selbst begriffen (1835)
  - Ueber das Verhältniß der Philosophie zum gesunden Menschenverstande, zur öffentlichen Meinung und zum Leben selbst, mit besonderer Hinsicht auf Hegel (1835)
  - Der hallische Löwe und die marzialischen Philosophen unserer Zeit oder neuester Krieg auf dem Gebiete der Philosophie (1838)

For a bibliography of Krug's writings see his autobiography Lebensreise (1842, pp. 343–360).
