= Dabrun =

- Stadtteil of Kemberg
- Interactive map of Dabrun
- Location within Germany Location within Saxony-Anhalt
- Coordinates: 51°50′N 12°43′E
- Country: Germany
- State: Saxony-Anhalt
- District: Wittenberg
- Town: Kemberg
- Subdivisions: 3

Area
  - Total: 18.62 km^{2} (7.19 sq mi)
- Elevation: 67 m (220 ft)

Population (2008)
  - Total: 628
  - Density: 33.7/km^{2} (87.4/sq mi)
- Time zone: UTC+01:00 (CET)
  - Summer (DST): UTC+02:00 (CEST)
- Postal codes: 06888
- Dialling codes: 03491
- Vehicle registration: WB

Dabrun is a village and a former municipality in Wittenberg district in Saxony-Anhalt, Germany. Since 1 January 2010, it has been part of the town Kemberg.

== Geography ==
Dabrun lies about 8 km southeast of Lutherstadt Wittenberg on the Elbe. The community belongs to the administrative community (Verwaltungsgemeinschaft) of Kemberg whose seat is in the town of Kemberg.

=== Subdivisions ===
Dabrun has three subdivisions:

- Melzwig
- Boos
- Rötzsch and the residential area of Dabruner Weinberg

== History ==
Dabrun had its first documentary mention in 1353 under the name Dobrunn.

== Buildings ==
The brick church was built in 1897.

== Sport ==
football SG Dabrun/Rackith Kreisliga Wittenberg

== Regular arrangements ==
- woman- und man-fastnacht (alternately). January
- youth-fastnacht (since 1936). March

carnival associations in the neighbourhood

- Wartenburg. CCW
- Trebitz. TCV
- Kemberg. Karnevalsclub Kemberg
- Lutherstadt Wittenberg. GWK

== Economy and transportation ==
Federal Highway (Bundesstraße) B 2 between Wittenberg and Bad Düben is 6 km away.
