= Dorna (Kemberg) =

- Stadtteil of Kemberg
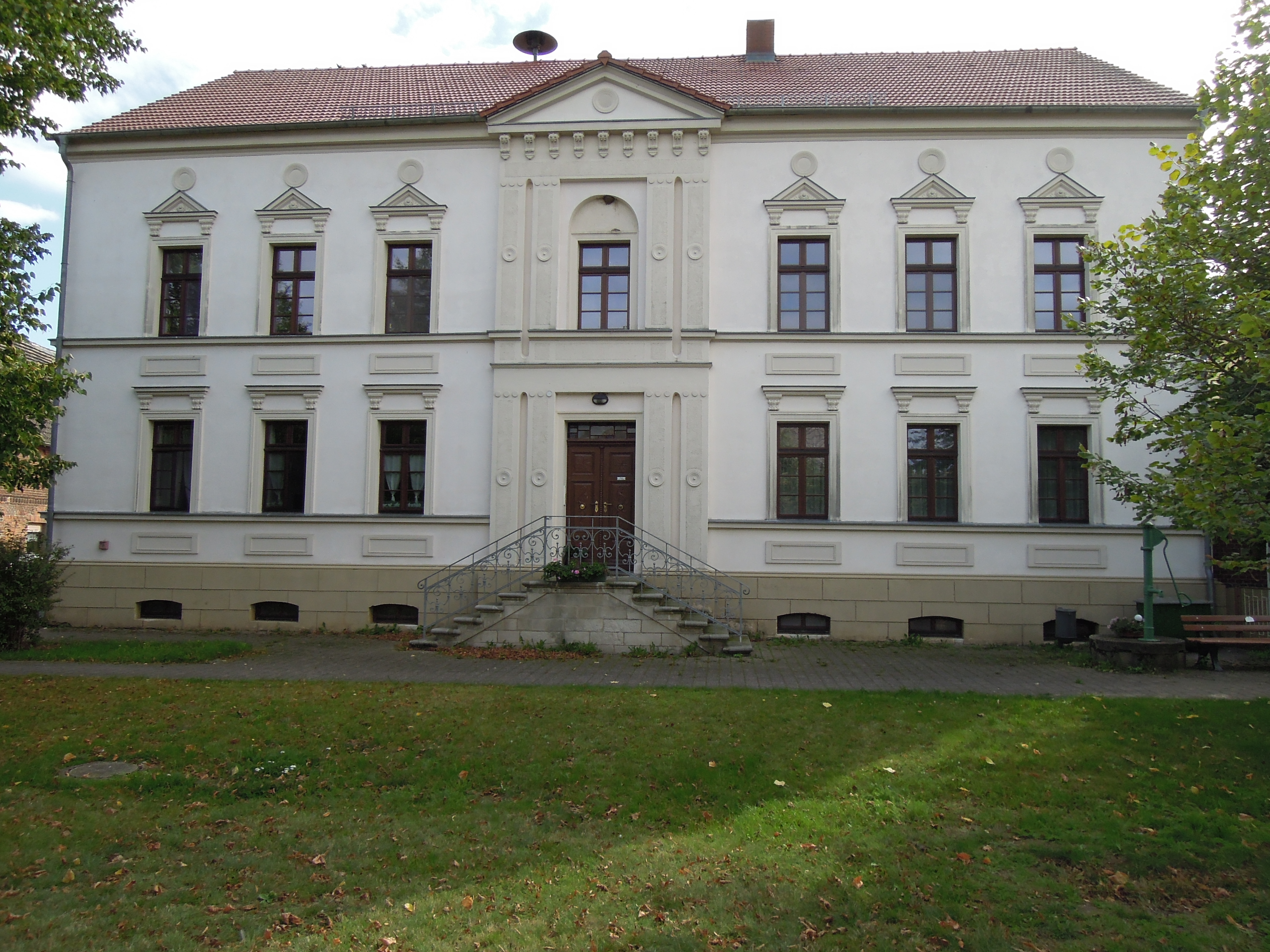
- Dorna in 2020
- Interactive map of Dorna
- Location within Germany Location within Saxony-Anhalt
- Coordinates: 51°46′N 12°43′E
- Country: Germany
- State: Saxony-Anhalt
- District: Wittenberg
- Town: Kemberg

Area
  - Total: 5.84 km^{2} (2.25 sq mi)
- Elevation: 69 m (226 ft)

Population (2005)
  - Total: 199
  - Density: 34.1/km^{2} (88.3/sq mi)
- Time zone: UTC+01:00 (CET)
  - Summer (DST): UTC+02:00 (CEST)
- Postal codes: 06901
- Dialling codes: 034927
- Vehicle registration: WB

Dorna is a village in Wittenberg district in Saxony-Anhalt, Germany. Since January 2007, it belongs to the town of Kemberg.

== Geography and transport ==
Dorna lies about 12 km (7.5 mi) southeast of Lutherstadt Wittenberg south of the Elbe. Through the community runs the Federal Highway (Bundesstraße) B 187 between Wittenberg and Torgau. South of the community is the Düben Heath.

== Politics ==
The last mayor of Dorna was Martina Ritter, first elected on 19 January 1994.

=== History ===
The community lay until 1815 in the Saxon Amt of Wittenberg, and next passed to the Prussian province of Saxony. In 1513, the community's name was recorded as Dornow.
