= Wilhelmine von Zenge =

German painter

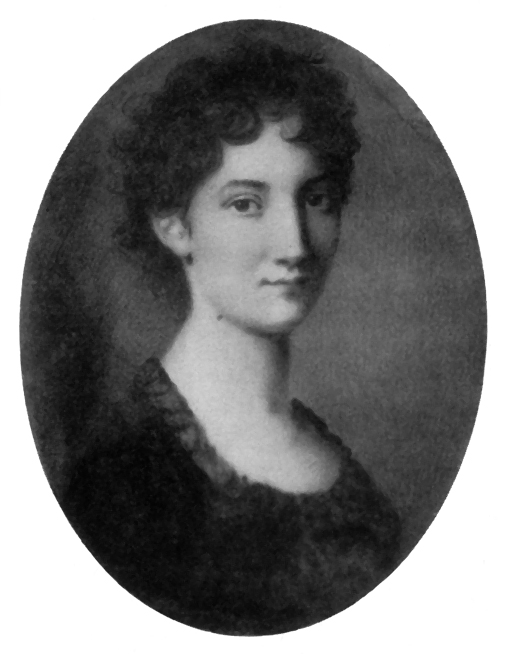
- Born: 20 August 1780; Berlin, Margraviate of Brandenburg
- Died: 25 April 1852 (aged 71); Leipzig, Kingdom of Saxony
- Occupation: Painter
- Spouse: Wilhelm Traugott Krug (m. 1804; died 1842)
- Children: 6

Wilhelhmine von Zenge (20 August 1780 – 25 April 1852) was a German pastellist.

== Life ==
Born either in Berlin, she was the daughter of a general, and became engaged to Heinrich von Kleist in 1800. In 1811, however, Kleist committed suicide with a friend. Instead, she married Wilhelm Traugott Krug three years later. She died in Leipzig.
