= Schleesen =

- Stadtteil of Kemberg
- Interactive map of Schleesen
- Location within Germany Location within Saxony-Anhalt
- Coordinates: 51°47′9″N 12°29′18″E
- Country: Germany
- State: Saxony-Anhalt
- District: Wittenberg
- Town: Kemberg
- Subdivisions: 2

Area
  - Total: 23.67 km^{2} (9.14 sq mi)
- Elevation: 75 m (246 ft)

Population (2006-12-31)
  - Total: 536
  - Density: 22.6/km^{2} (58.6/sq mi)
- Time zone: UTC+01:00 (CET)
  - Summer (DST): UTC+02:00 (CEST)
- Postal codes: 06785
- Dialling codes: 034904
- Vehicle registration: WB
- Website: www.vwg-kemberg.de

Schleesen is a village and a former municipality in Wittenberg district in Saxony-Anhalt, Germany. Since 1 January 2010, it is part of the town Kemberg.

== Geography ==
Schleesen lies about 15 km southwest of Lutherstadt Wittenberg on the edge of the Flusslandschaft Mittlere Elbe biosphere reserve.

=== Subdivisions ===
Schleesen has two of these: Naderkau and Bräunigk.

== History ==
Schleesen had its first documentary mention on 12 December 1200 under the name Selezne in a document from the monastery at Wörlitz. The church was built about 1250.

== Regular events ==
The Rosenfest is held yearly on the third weekend in July.

== Economy and transportation ==
Schleesen lies on the L 132 state road from Oranienbaum-Wörlitz to Radis and on district road (Kreisstraße) K2040 from Selbitz to Schleesen. Federal Highway (Bundesstraße) B 107 between Gräfenhainichen and Coswig is about 6 km away, and the B 100 between Gräfenhainichen and Wittenberg is about 5 km away. The Autobahn interchange with Bundesautobahn 9, Dessau-Ost, is about 12 km away.

The nearest railway station is found at Radis on the line between Wittenberg and Bitterfeld.

== Personalities ==
Richard Bartmuß (born 23 December 1859; died 1910), was a German composer.
