= Globig-Bleddin =

- Stadtteil of Kemberg
- Interactive map of Globig-Bleddin
- Location within Germany Location within Saxony-Anhalt
- Coordinates: 51°47′N 12°47′E
- Country: Germany
- State: Saxony-Anhalt
- District: Wittenberg
- Town: Kemberg
- Subdivisions: 2

Area
  - Total: 15.92 km^{2} (6.15 sq mi)
- Elevation: 69 m (226 ft)

Population (2006-12-31)
  - Total: 594
  - Density: 37.3/km^{2} (96.6/sq mi)
- Time zone: UTC+01:00 (CET)
  - Summer (DST): UTC+02:00 (CEST)
- Postal codes: 06901
- Dialling codes: 034927
- Vehicle registration: WB

Globig-Bleddin is a village and a former municipality in Wittenberg district in Saxony-Anhalt, Germany. Globig-Bleddin is divided into the subdivisions of Globig and Bleddin. Since 2009, it has been part of Kemberg. Globig-Bleddin lies about 20 km southeast of Lutherstadt Wittenberg on the Elbe. Federal Highway (Bundesstraße) B 182 between Torgau and Wittenberg lies 11 km from the community.

== History ==
Globig had its first documentary mention in 1292 under the name Globik, and Bleddin had its first documentary mention in 1376 under the name Bledin. Globig and Bleddin were occupied by French forces in 1813 in the Battle of Wartenburg.

On 1 January 2009, Globig-Bleddin was incorporated into the town Kemberg.
