= Wartenburg (Kemberg) =

- Stadtteil of Kemberg
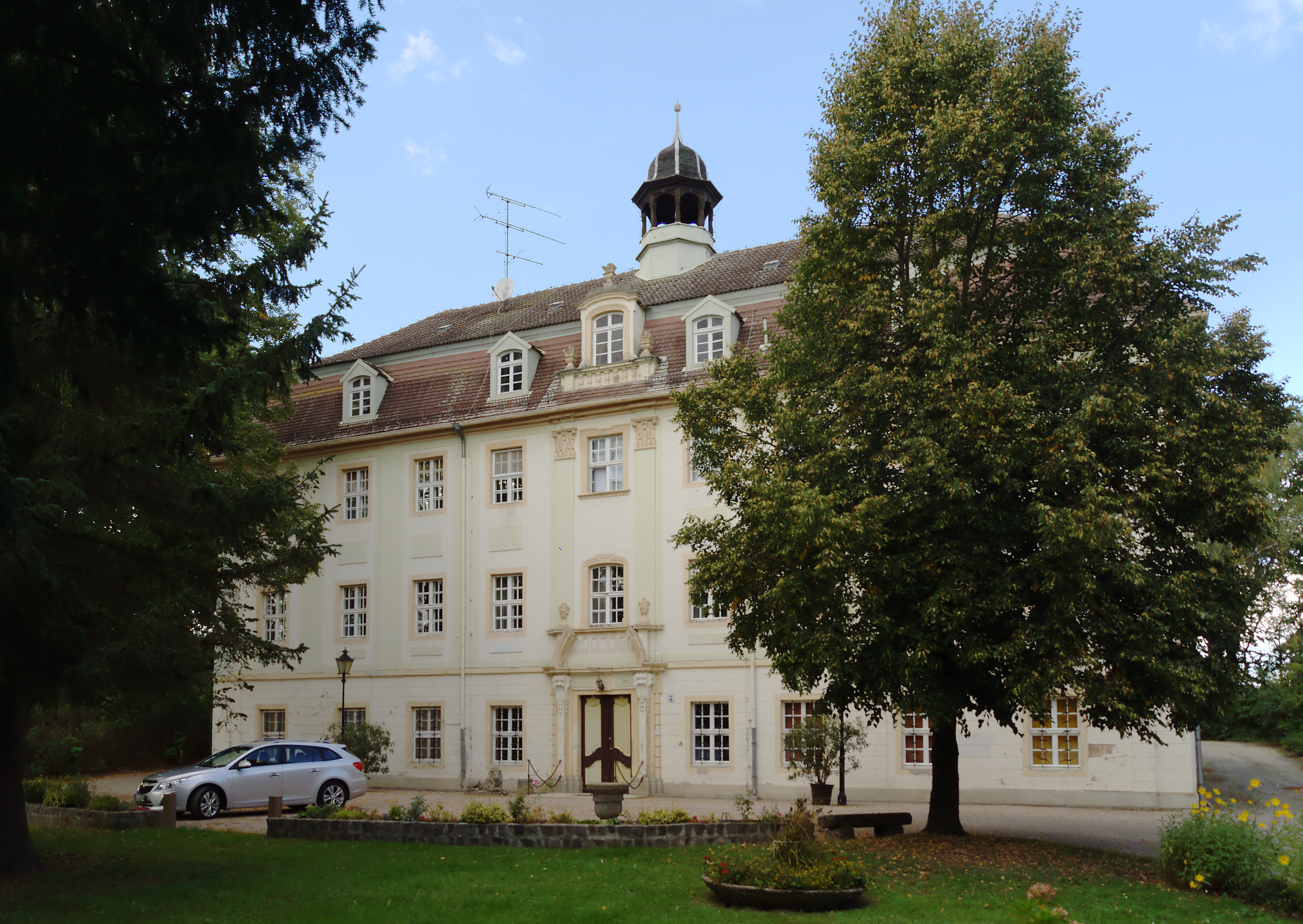
- Wartenburg Castle

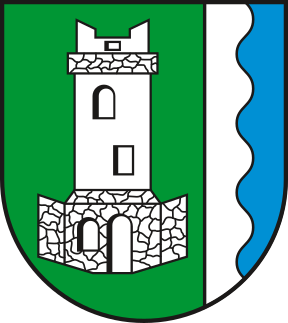
- Coat of arms
- Interactive map of Wartenburg
- Location within Germany Location within Saxony-Anhalt
- Coordinates: 51°48′41″N 12°46′53″E
- Country: Germany
- State: Saxony-Anhalt
- District: Wittenberg
- Town: Kemberg

Area
  - Total: 15.67 km^{2} (6.05 sq mi)
- Elevation: 69 m (226 ft)

Population (2006-12-31)
  - Total: 796
  - Density: 50.8/km^{2} (132/sq mi)
- Time zone: UTC+01:00 (CET)
  - Summer (DST): UTC+02:00 (CEST)
- Postal codes: 06901
- Dialling codes: 034927
- Vehicle registration: WB
- Website: www.vwg-kemberg.de

Wartenburg is a village and a former municipality in Wittenberg district in Saxony-Anhalt, Germany. Since 1 January 2010, it is part of the town Kemberg.

== Geography ==
Wartenburg lies about 12 km southeast of Lutherstadt Wittenberg on the Elbe.

== History ==
Wartenburg had its first documentary mention in 1176 under the name Wardenberch. The community has become well known for the engagement and successful crossing of the Elbe by Prussian and Russian troops under General Yorck von Wartenburg in 1813, late in the Napoleonic Wars once they were into a phase known in Germany as the Wars of Liberation. For his success in battle, Yorck was awarded the title of Count York of Wartenburg.

== Economy and transport ==
Federal Highway (Bundesstraße) B 187 between Jessen and Wittenberg is about 4 km away.

== Personalities ==
- Hans Christoph von Ebeleben, 23 June 1578 – 7 November 1651, was a German jurist and administrative official.
