= Uthausen =

- Stadtteil of Kemberg
- Interactive map of Uthausen
- Location within Germany Location within Saxony-Anhalt
- Coordinates: 51°45′57″N 12°33′32″E
- Country: Germany
- State: Saxony-Anhalt
- District: Wittenberg
- Town: Kemberg

Area
  - Total: 8.00 km^{2} (3.09 sq mi)
- Elevation: 95 m (312 ft)

Population (2006-12-31)
  - Total: 209
  - Density: 26.1/km^{2} (67.7/sq mi)
- Time zone: UTC+01:00 (CET)
  - Summer (DST): UTC+02:00 (CEST)
- Postal codes: 06773
- Dialling codes: 034921
- Vehicle registration: WB
- Website: www.vwg-kemberg.de

Uthausen is a village and a former municipality in Wittenberg district in Saxony-Anhalt, Germany. Since 1 January 2010, it is part of the town Kemberg.

== Geography ==
Uthausen lies about 15 km southwest of Lutherstadt Wittenberg.

== History ==
Uthausen had its first documentary mention in 1308.

== Regular events ==
The Uthausen Tower Festival (Turmfest) is held yearly in early August.

== Economy and transportation ==
Federal Highway (Bundesstraße) B 100 between Gräfenhainichen and Wittenberg runs straight through the municipality.
