= Eutzsch =

- Stadtteil of Kemberg
- Interactive map of Eutzsch
- Location within Germany Location within Saxony-Anhalt
- Coordinates: 51°49′N 12°38′E
- Country: Germany
- State: Saxony-Anhalt
- District: Wittenberg
- Town: Kemberg
- Subdivisions: 3

Area
  - Total: 13.83 km^{2} (5.34 sq mi)
- Elevation: 67 m (220 ft)

Population (2006-12-31)
  - Total: 654
  - Density: 47.3/km^{2} (122/sq mi)
- Time zone: UTC+01:00 (CET)
  - Summer (DST): UTC+02:00 (CEST)
- Postal codes: 06888
- Dialling codes: 03491
- Vehicle registration: WB

Eutzsch is a village and a former municipality in Wittenberg district in Saxony-Anhalt, Germany. Since 1 January 2010, it is part of the town Kemberg.

== Geography ==
Eutzsch lies about 6 km south of Lutherstadt Wittenberg.

== History ==
Eutzsch had its first documentary mention in 965 under the name Usizi.

== Economy and transportation ==
Federal Highway (Bundesstraße) B 2 between Wittenberg and Bad Düben, and the B 100 both run straight through the community. Eutzsch's railway station is on the line running from Berlin to Nuremberg and Munich.
