= Kemberg =

- Town
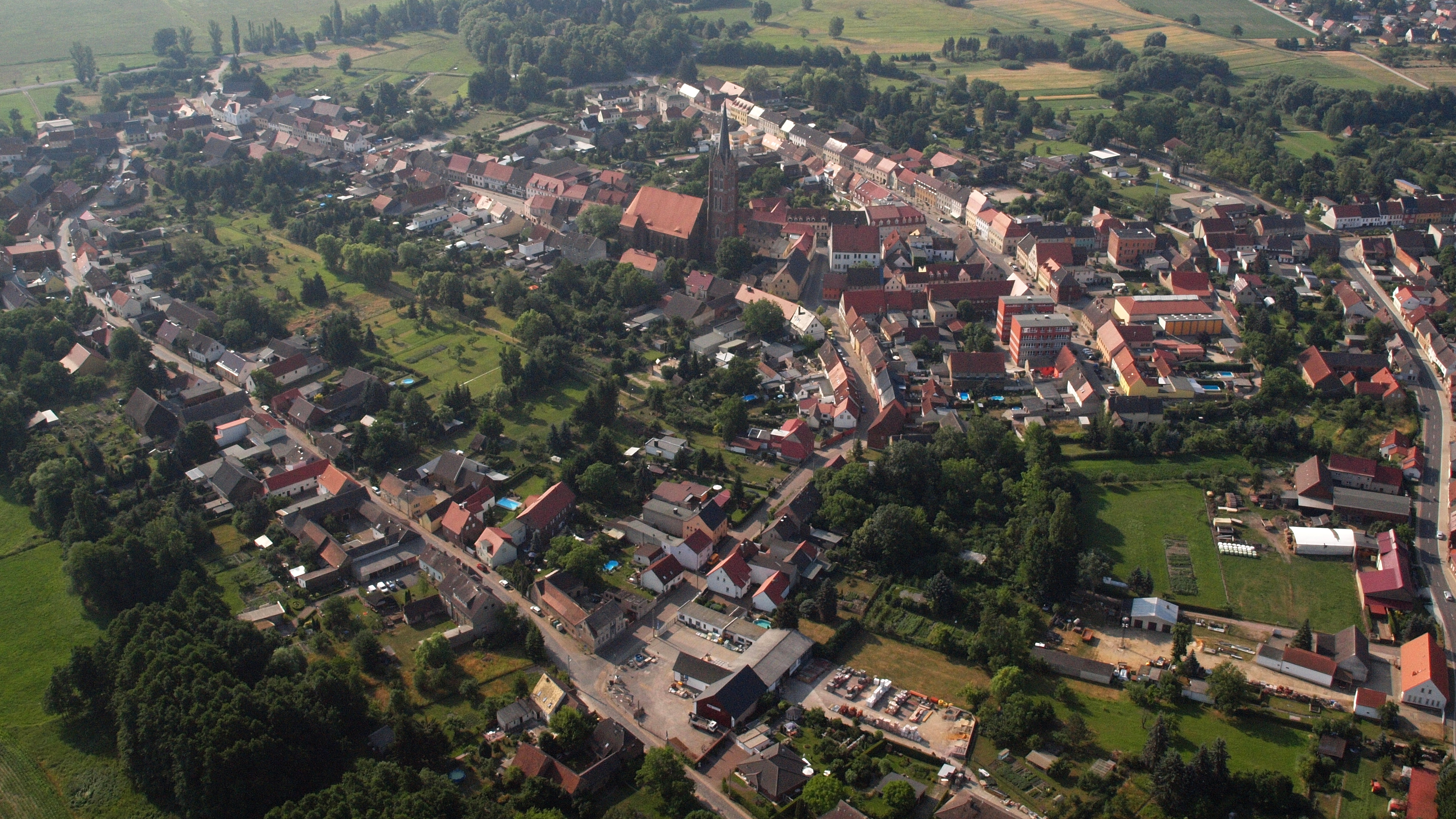
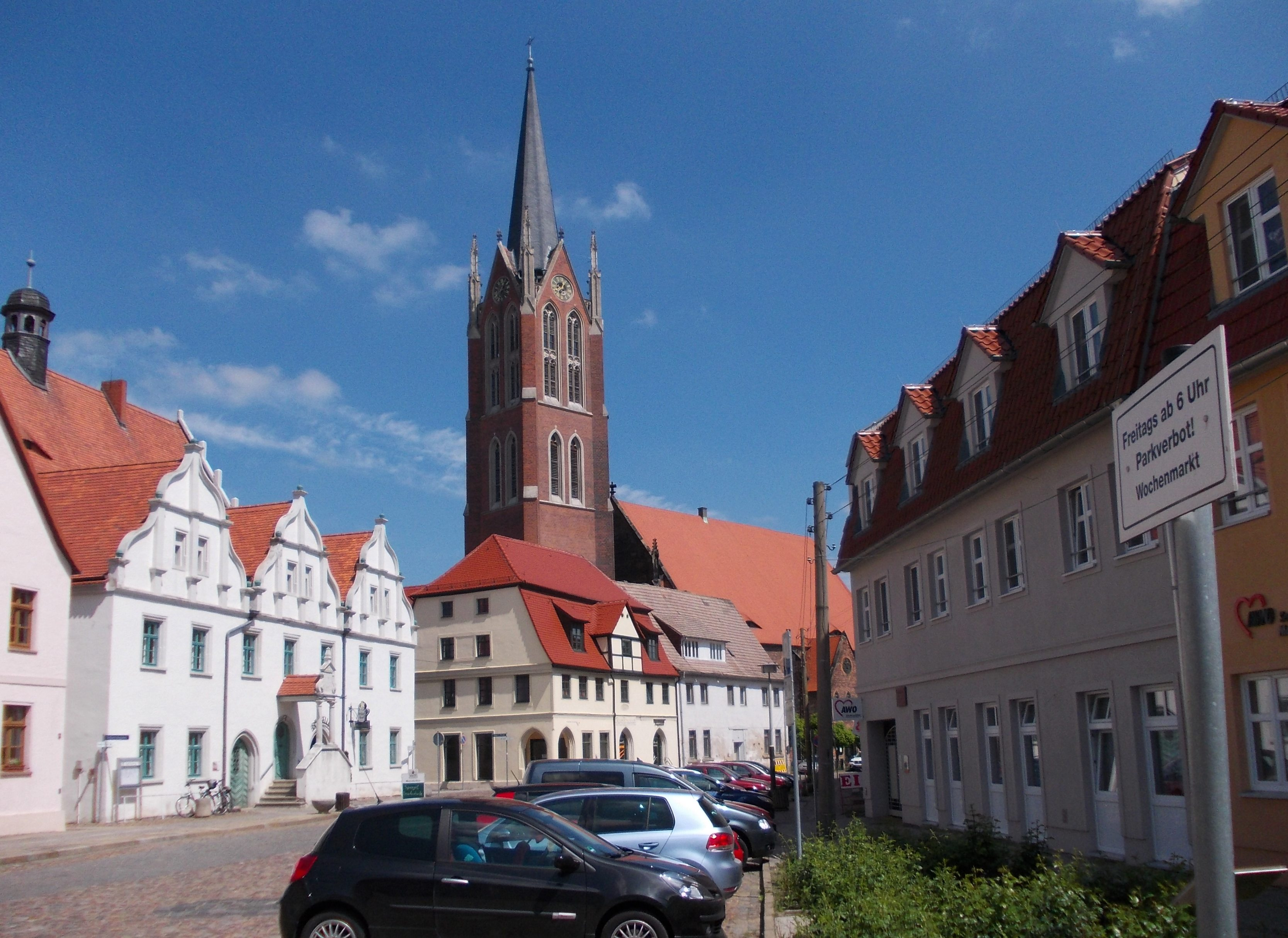
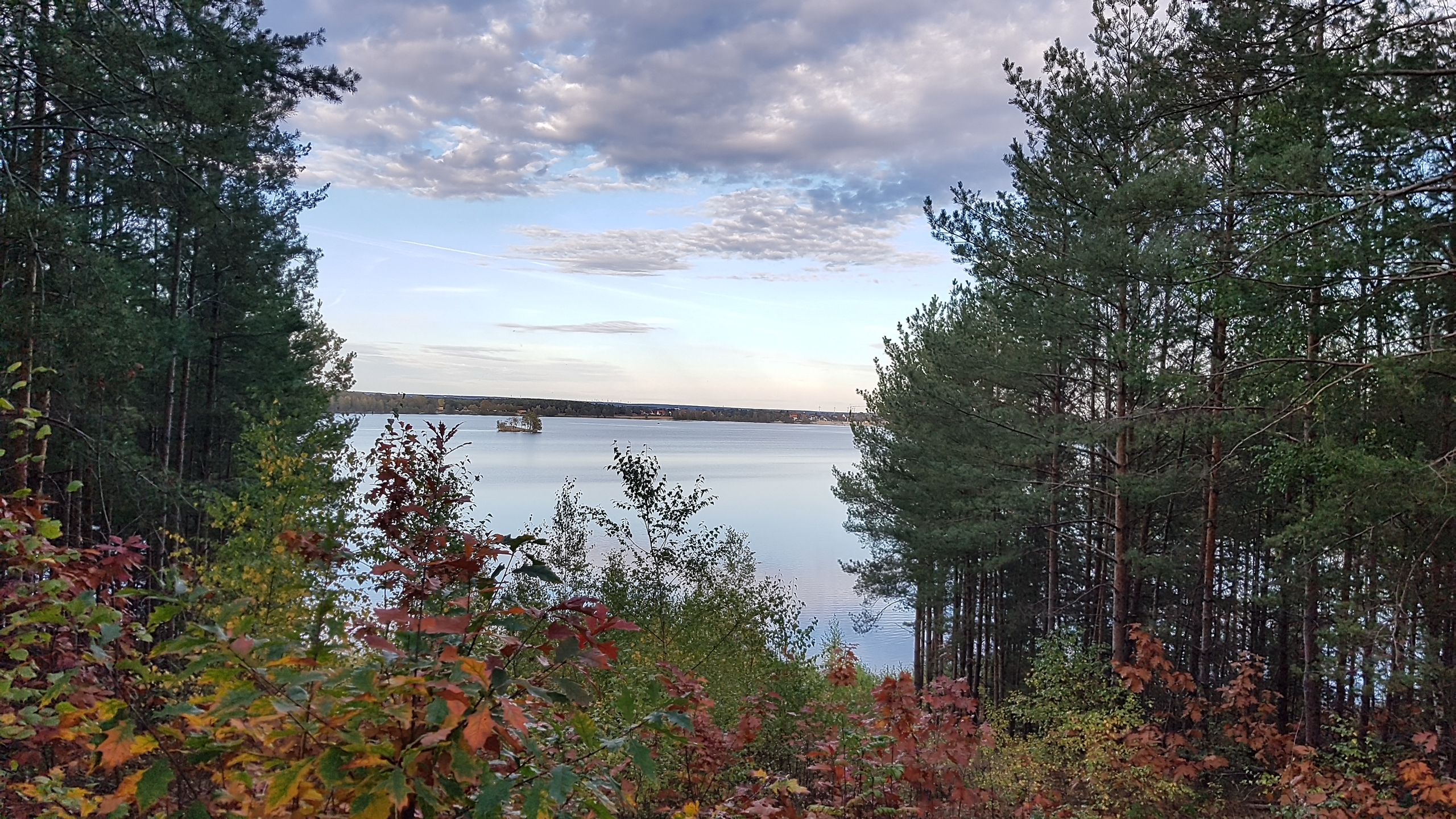
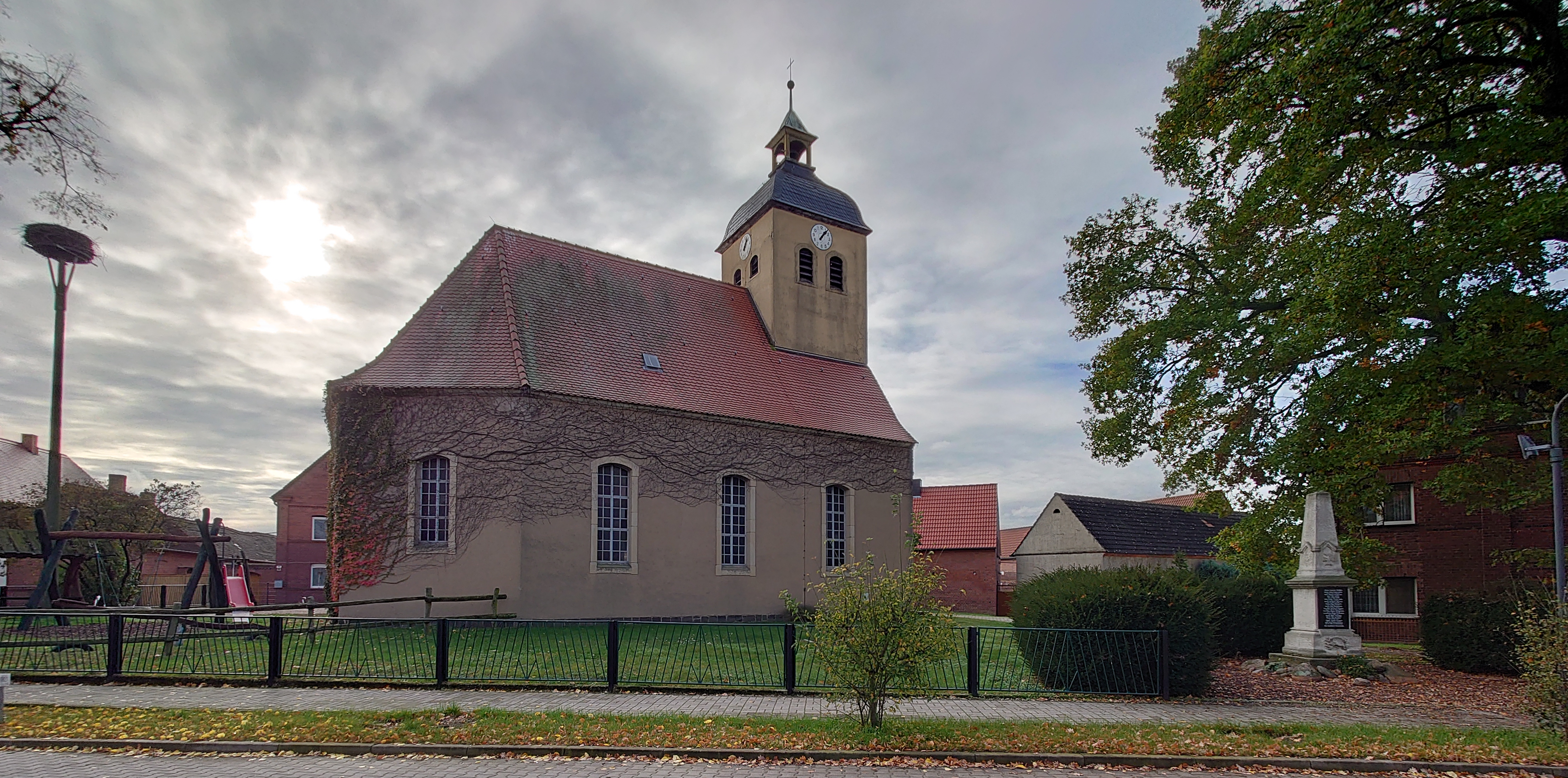
- Kemberg from air, 2015 Church with market square View over Bergwitzsee Church Selbitz

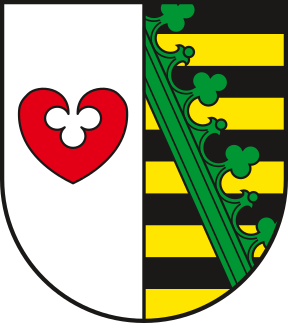
- Coat of arms

- Location of Kemberg within Wittenberg district
- Interactive map of Kemberg
- Location within Germany Location within Saxony-Anhalt
- Coordinates: 51°47′N 12°38′E
- Country: Germany
- State: Saxony-Anhalt
- District: Wittenberg

Government
  - Mayor (2023–30): Torsten Seelig (CDU)

Area
  - Total: 235.22 km^{2} (90.82 sq mi)
- Elevation: 76 m (249 ft)

Population (2025-12-31)
  - Total: 9,089
  - Density: 38.64/km^{2} (100.1/sq mi)
- Time zone: UTC+01:00 (CET)
  - Summer (DST): UTC+02:00 (CEST)
- Postal codes: 06901
- Dialling codes: 034921
- Vehicle registration: WB
- Website: www.kemberg.de

Kemberg (German: [ˈkɛmˌbɛʁk]) is a town in Wittenberg district in Saxony-Anhalt, Germany. The town lies on the north edge of the Düben Heath Nature Park.

== Subdivisions ==
The town Kemberg consists of the following Ortschaften or municipal districts:

- Ateritz
- Bergwitz
- Dabrun
- Dorna
- Eutzsch
- Globig-Bleddin
- Kemberg
- Rackith
- Radis
- Rotta
- Schleesen
- Selbitz
- Uthausen
- Wartenburg

== History ==
On 1 July 2005, the municipality of Bergwitz with its subdivision of Klitzschena, was amalgamated with Kemberg, as was the municipality of Ateritz (with its subdivisions of Gommlo and Lubast) on 1 January 2006 and Dorna on 1 January 2007. In 2009 The former municipality of Globig-Bleddin was also amalgamated into Kemberg. On 1 January 2010 the former municipalities Dabrun, Eutzsch, Rackith, Radis, Rotta, Schleesen, Selbitz, Uthausen and Wartenburg were merged into Kemberg.

== Main sights ==
The town's most striking sight is the soaring Church of Our Lady ("Unser Lieben Frauen") which can be seen far away over the Elbaue (natural polder). It is a hall church with a nave and two aisles dating from the 15th century (or so it is believed) with an 86-m-tall tower built in the 19th century. There are things there such as remnants of wall paintings from the late Middle Ages, a sacrament house made of sandstone and a carved altar (both from the 15th century) and a very nice baptismal font. Also worth seeing are the late Gothic town hall with its Renaissance additions and the old town wall from the 14th century, parts of which are still well preserved.

Kemberg's well preserved town centre takes the visitor to bygone days and is always worth seeing on foot. The town is also well placed for outings to the nearby heath, and to Wittenberg.

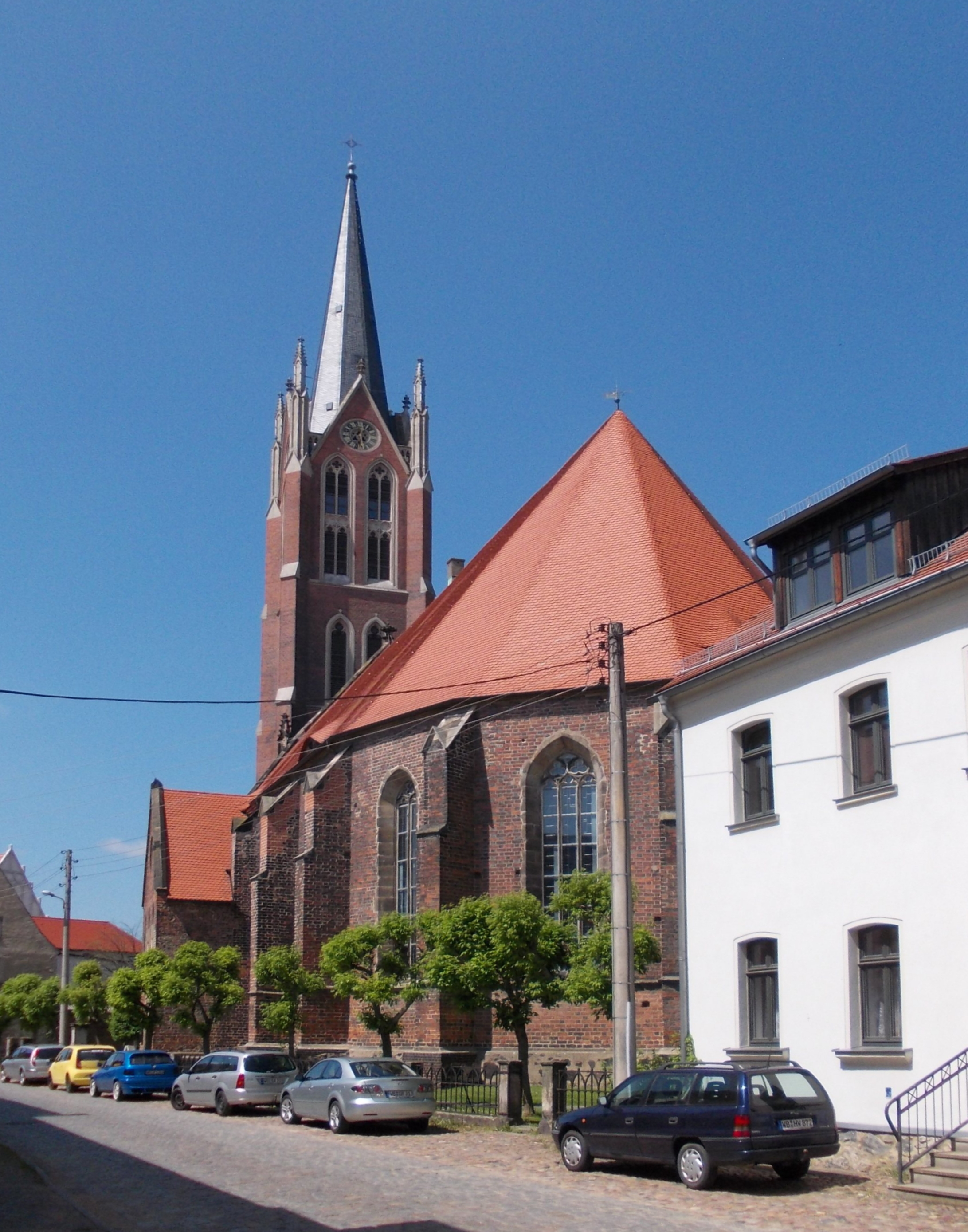
St. Mary church Kemberg

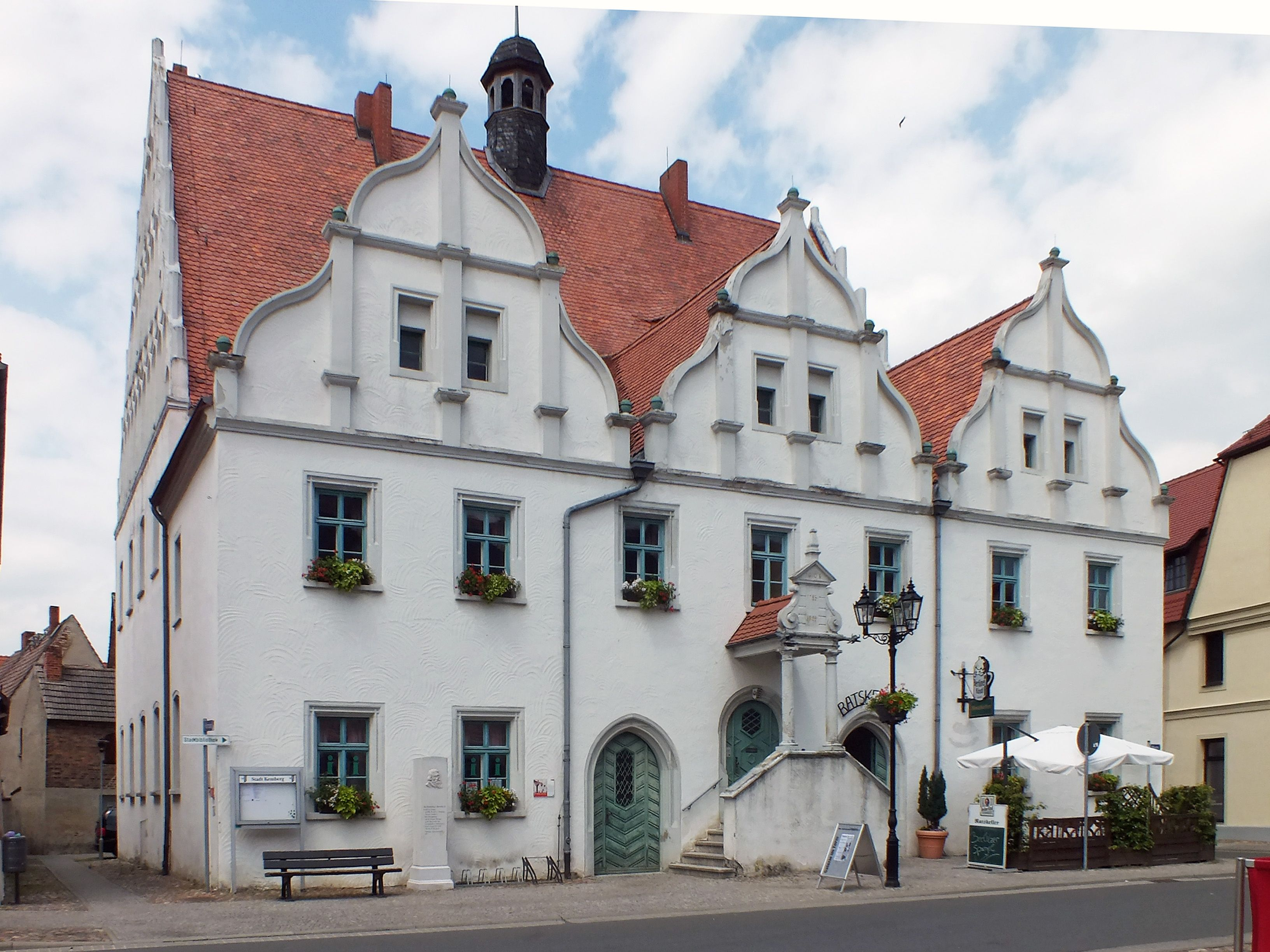
Town hall

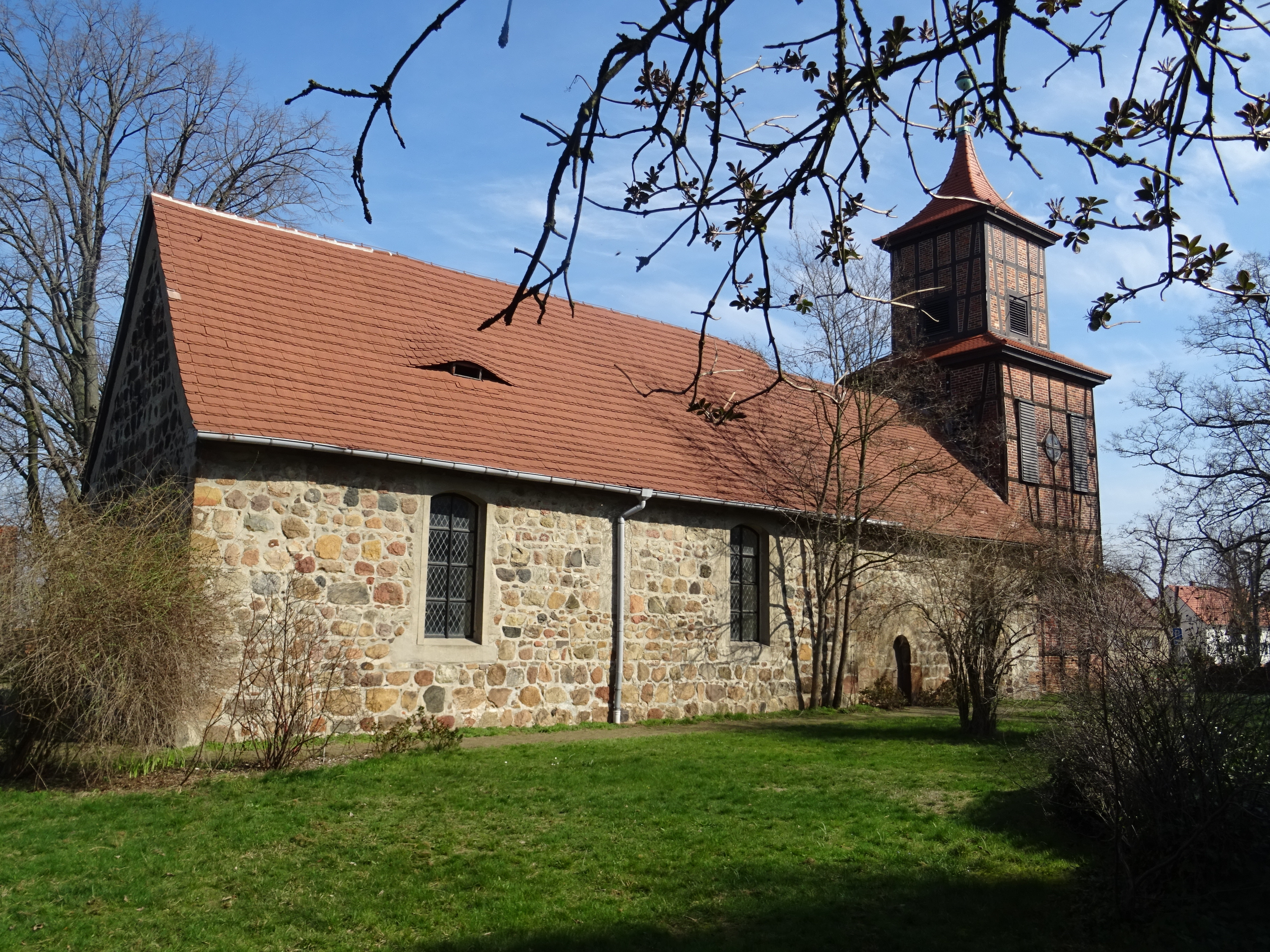
Church in Bergwitz

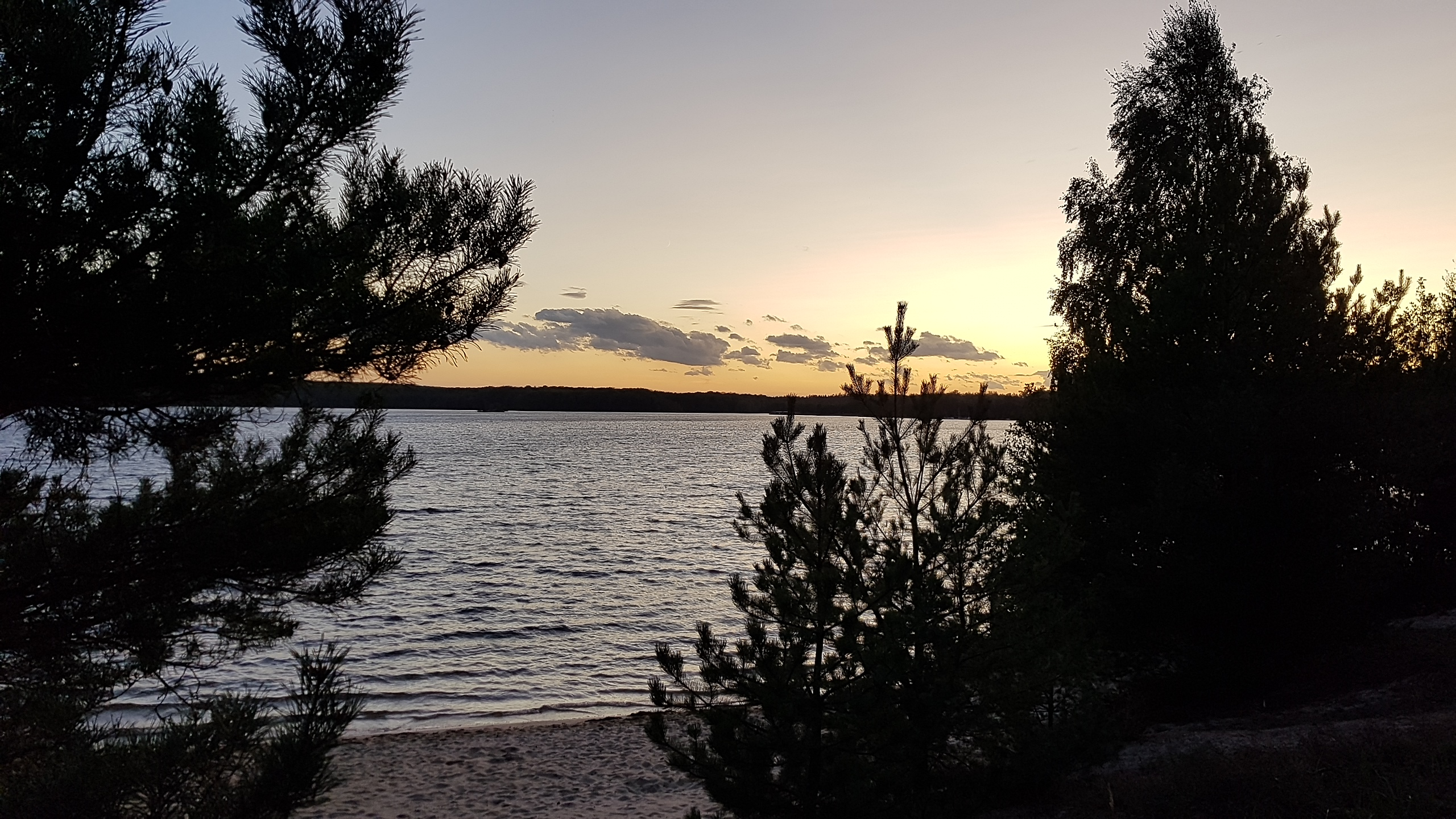
Bergwitz lake

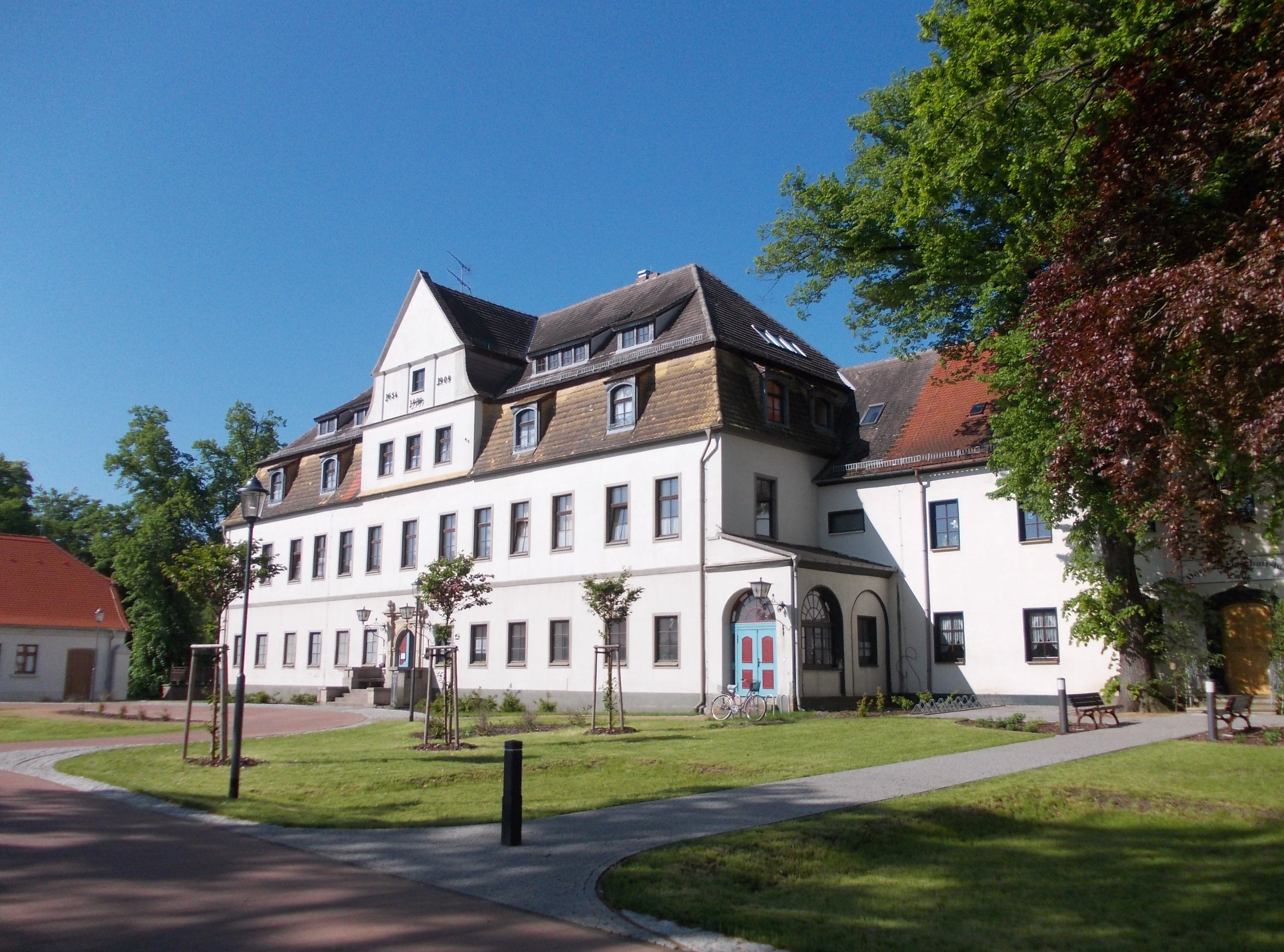
Radis castle

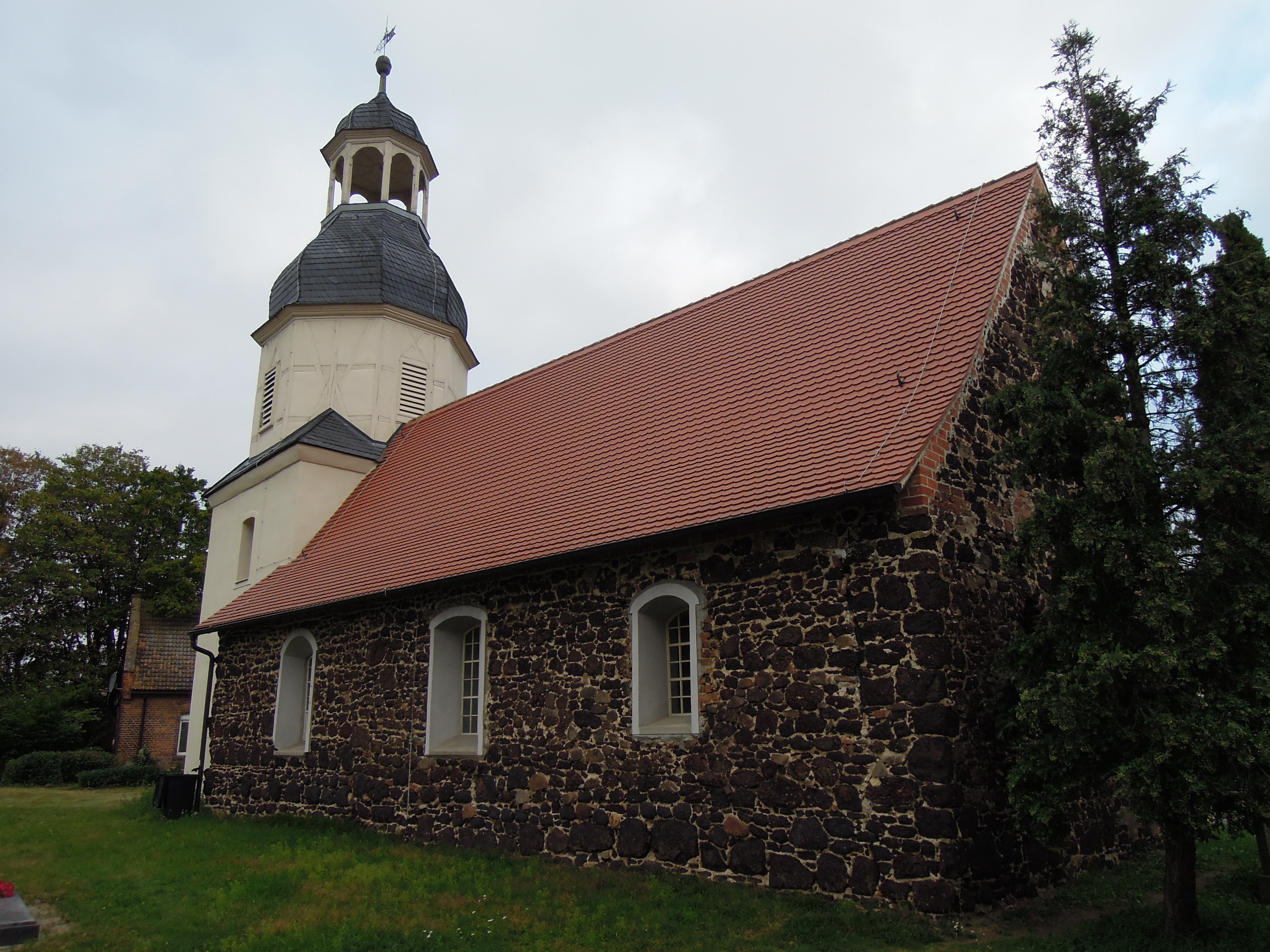
Church in Klitzschena

== Transport ==
Kemberg lies on Federal Highway (Bundesstraße) B 2 to Bad Düben, on the state highway (Landesstraße) L129 from Bergwitz to Bad Schmiedeberg and on the district road (Kreisstraße) K2024 between Reuden and Trebitz.

Bergwitz lies on Bundesstraße B 100 from Wittenberg to Bitterfeld and on Landesstraße L129 from Selbitz to Kemberg.

Klitzschena lies on district road K2041 from Bergwitz to Seegrehna.

Bundesautobahn 9 (Munich - Berlin) can be reached by the Vockerode interchange 22 km away.

Bergwitz railway station lies on the Deutsche Bahn line between Wittenberg and Bitterfeld.

From 1903 to 1951, there was a railway connection between Bergwitz and Kemberg. The former station has been demolished. There is now a hypermarket there.

== Famous people ==
- Bartholomäus Bernhardi, Theologian
- Friedrich Werner von der Schulenburg, German diplomat and resistance fighter in the 20 July Plot
- Ernestine Christine Reiske, German translator of classical texts
