= Rotta, Germany =

Rotta
- Stadtteil of Kemberg
- Interactive map of Rotta
- Location within Germany Location within Saxony-Anhalt
- Coordinates: 51°46′0″N 12°36′14″E
- Country: Germany
- State: Saxony-Anhalt
- District: Wittenberg
- Town: Kemberg
- Subdivisions: 2

Area
  - Total: 29.37 km^{2} (11.34 sq mi)
- Elevation: 80 m (260 ft)

Population (2006-12-31)
  - Total: 860
  - Density: 29/km^{2} (76/sq mi)
- Time zone: UTC+01:00 (CET)
  - Summer (DST): UTC+02:00 (CEST)
- Postal codes: 06773
- Dialling codes: 034921
- Vehicle registration: WB

Rotta is a village and a former municipality in Wittenberg district in Saxony-Anhalt, Germany. Since 1 January 2010, it is part of the town Kemberg.

== Geography ==
Rotta lies about 15 km southwest of Lutherstadt Wittenberg on the edge of the Düben Heath Nature Park.

=== Subdivisions ===
Rotta has three of these: Reuden, Gniest and Kolonie Gniest.

== History ==
Rotta had its first documentary mention in 1323.

== Economy and transportation ==
Rotta is about 2 km from both Federal Highway (Bundesstraße) B 2 and B 100.
