= Rackith =

- Stadtteil of Kemberg
- Interactive map of Rackith
- Location within Germany Location within Saxony-Anhalt
- Coordinates: 51°48′N 12°41′E
- Country: Germany
- State: Saxony-Anhalt
- District: Wittenberg
- Town: Kemberg
- Subdivisions: 2

Area
  - Total: 18.99 km^{2} (7.33 sq mi)
- Elevation: 67 m (220 ft)

Population (2006-12-31)
  - Total: 663
  - Density: 34.9/km^{2} (90.4/sq mi)
- Time zone: UTC+01:00 (CET)
  - Summer (DST): UTC+02:00 (CEST)
- Postal codes: 06901
- Dialling codes: 034927
- Website: www.vgem-kemberg.de

Rackith is a village and a former municipality in Wittenberg district in Saxony-Anhalt, Germany. Since 1 January 2010, it is part of the town Kemberg.

== Geography ==
Rackith lies about 12 km southeast of Lutherstadt Wittenberg.

=== Subdivisions ===
Rackith has two of these: Lammsdorf and Bietegast.

== History ==
Rackith had its first documentary mention in 1004.

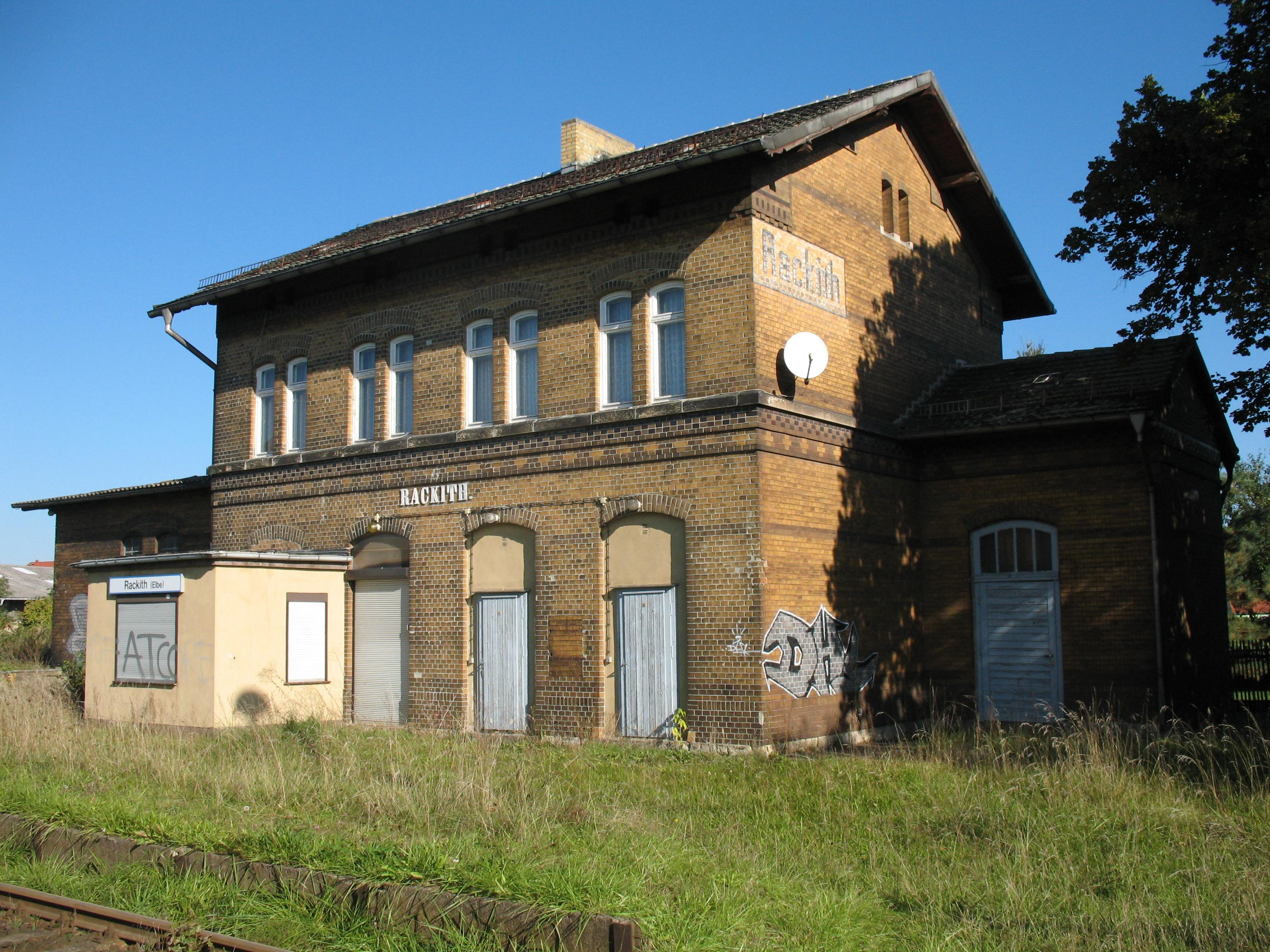
Railway station

== Economy and transportation ==
Federal Highway (Bundesstraße) B 182 between Wittenberg and Torgau runs right through the community. Rackith railway station lies on the single-track line between Wittenberg and Bad Schmiedeberg.
