= Radis =

- Stadtteil of Kemberg
- Interactive map of Radis
- Location within Germany Location within Saxony-Anhalt
- Coordinates: 51°45′N 12°31′E
- Country: Germany
- State: Saxony-Anhalt
- District: Wittenberg
- Town: Kemberg

Area
  - Total: 19.82 km^{2} (7.65 sq mi)
- Elevation: 122 m (400 ft)

Population (2006-12-31)
  - Total: 1,326
  - Density: 66.90/km^{2} (173.3/sq mi)
- Time zone: UTC+01:00 (CET)
  - Summer (DST): UTC+02:00 (CEST)
- Postal codes: 06901
- Dialling codes: 034953
- Vehicle registration: WB
- Website: www.vwg-kemberg.de

Radis (German pronunciation: [ˈʁaːdis]) is a village and a former municipality in Wittenberg district in Saxony-Anhalt, Germany. Since 1 January 2010, it is part of the town Kemberg.

== Geography ==
Radis lies about 20 km southwest of Lutherstadt Wittenberg on the edge of the Düben Heath Nature Park.

== History ==
Radis was first documented in 1378 under the name Rodiß.

== Culture and sightseeing ==
The Papsthaus ("Pope House"), located in a wooded area about 2 km west of Radis, was where Johann Gottfried Galle (1812–1910) was born. With his startling discovery of the planet Neptune, among other things, he became one of Germany's most important astronomers.

== Economy and transportation ==
Federal Highway (Bundesstraße) B 100 between Wittenberg and Gräfenhainichen runs right through the community. Radis railway station lies on the line between Wittenberg and Gräfenhainichen.

== Notable residents ==
- Wilhelm Traugott Krug, philosopher
- Johann Gottfried Galle, astronomer
