= Selbitz (Kemberg) =

- Stadtteil of Kemberg
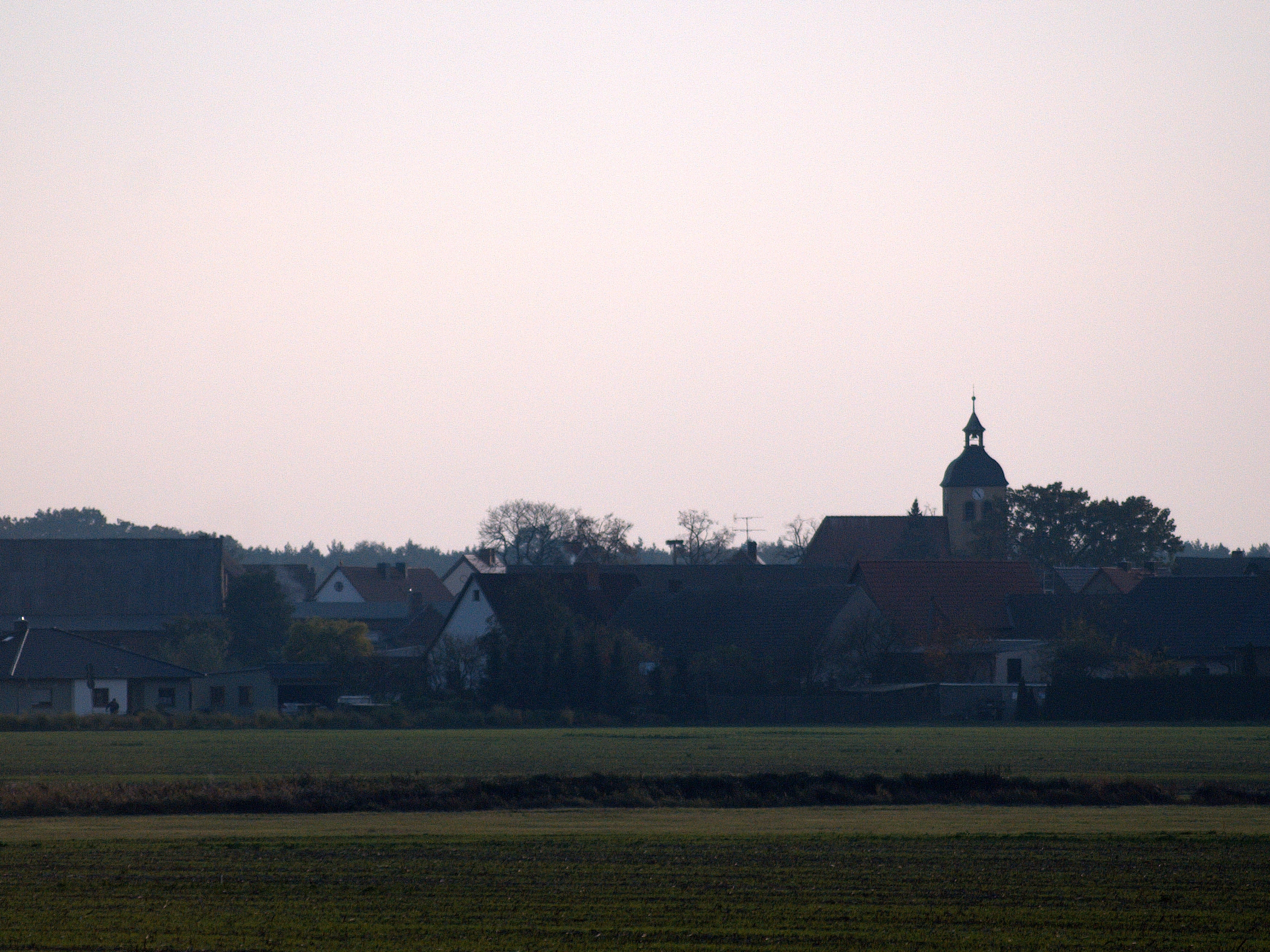
- Interactive map of Selbitz
- Location within Germany Location within Saxony-Anhalt
- Coordinates: 51°49′N 12°32′E
- Country: Germany
- State: Saxony-Anhalt
- District: Wittenberg
- Town: Kemberg

Area
  - Total: 6.20 km^{2} (2.39 sq mi)
- Elevation: 64 m (210 ft)

Population (2008)
  - Total: 381
  - Density: 61.5/km^{2} (159/sq mi)
- Time zone: UTC+01:00 (CET)
  - Summer (DST): UTC+02:00 (CEST)
- Postal codes: 06773
- Dialling codes: 034928

Selbitz is a village and a former municipality in Wittenberg district in Saxony-Anhalt, Germany. Since 1 January 2010, it is part of the town Kemberg.

== Geography ==
Selbitz lies about 12 km southwest of Lutherstadt Wittenberg on the edge of the Flusslandschaft Mittlere Elbe biosphere reserve.

== History ==
Selbitz had its first documentary mention in 1388 under the name Slewitz.

== Partnerships ==
Selbitz maintains a partnership with the like-named town of Selbitz in Hof district in Bavaria.

== Economy and transportation ==
Federal Highway (Bundesstraße) B 100 between Gräfenhainichen and Coswig is about 10 km away.
