= Friedhelm =

Friedhelm is a name of Germanic origin. It may refer to:

- Friedhelm Busse (1929–2008), German national socialist politician and activist
- Friedhelm Döhl (born 1936), German composer and professor of music
- Friedhelm Eronat (born 1953), Geneva-based millionaire business leader in oil trading, exploration and production
- Friedhelm Farthmann (1930–2024), German academic and politician
- Friedhelm Funkel (born 1953), German football manager and former player
- Friedhelm Haebermann (born 1946), former German football player and manager
- Friedhelm Hardy (1943–2004), Professor of Indian Religions, teaching at King's College London
- Friedhelm Hengsbach (born 1937), professor emeritus for Christian social ethics
- Friedhelm Konietzka (1938–2012), German football striker and manager
- Friedhelm Sack (born 1956), Namibian sport shooter
- Friedhelm Schütte (born 1957), former professional German footballer
- Friedhelm Waldhausen (1938–2024), German mathematician known for his work in algebraic topology
- Friedhelm Wentzke (born 1935), German sprint canoeist who competed in the early to mid-1960s

== See also ==
- Hurricane Bawbag, storm officially named Friedhelm
- Fedelm
- Friede
- Friedel
- Friedl
