= Friedel =

Friedel or Friedl is a Southern German diminutive variation of the surname Fried - or alternately, a diminutive of Elfriede - and may refer to:

Four French scientists with the same Friedel family name are in direct lineage, Charles, Georges, Edmond and Jacques:

- Charles Friedel (1832–1899), French chemist known for the Friedel–Crafts reaction
- Georges Friedel (1865–1933), French crystallographer and mineralogist; son of Charles
- Edmond Friedel (1895–1972), French Polytechnician and mining engineer, founder of BRGM, the French geological survey; son of Georges
- Jacques Friedel (1921–2014), French physicist; son of Edmond, see the French site for Jacques Friedel

Other people:

- Brad Friedel (born 1971), American international football (soccer) goalkeeper
- Frederic Friedel (born 1945), produced documentaries for German TV
- Samuel Friedel (1898–1979), former U.S. Congressman who represented the 7th congressional district of Maryland
- Joshua Friedel (born 1986), American professional chess player

== Related items ==
- Friedel's law, named after Georges Friedel, the crystallographer, is a property of Fourier transforms of real functions
- Friedel's salt, discovered by Georges Friedel, is an anion exchanger mineral belonging to the family of the layered double hydroxides (LDHs)
- Friedel oscillations, peculiar behavior of electrons near impurities and interfaces in metals

== See also ==
- Freidel
- Friedl
