= Cement industry in the United States =

The cement industry in the United States produced 82.8 million tonnes (81,500,000 long tons; 91,300,000 short tons) of cement in 2015, worth US$9.8 billion, and was used to manufacture concrete worth about US$50 billion. The US was the world's third-largest producer of cement, after China and India. The US cement industry includes 99 cement mills in 34 states, plus two plants in Puerto Rico. The industry directly employed 10,000 workers in 2015. Ten percent of the cement used in the United States in 2015 was imported.

== Uses ==
The types and amounts of cement produced in 2015 were:

- Portland cement 80.4 million tons
- Masonry cement 2.4 million tons
- Other hydraulic cement 0.6 million tons

Cement production is predominantly portland cement, which is mostly used in concrete. Cement for concrete is an essential material for construction, and demand is a function of construction spending. Single-family residential construction is considered only moderately cement-intensive; multifamily residential somewhat more intensive. Nonresidential construction and government construction projects are considered the most cement-intensive.

In 2013, 70.8 percent of portland cement was sold as ready-mix concrete, such as is delivered in cement-mixer trucks. 11.5 percent was sold dry to contractors and construction materials stores; 11.3 percent was sold to manufacturers of concrete products; 4.6 percent was sold for oil and gas wells, and 1.8 percent was sold to government agencies and others.

== Geography ==
Because cement is a bulk commodity, transportation can be a significant part of the cost. To minimize transportation costs, cement plants are ideally located close to the market, with access to efficient transportation such as ship or railroad. Most cement plants are located close to the limestone deposits.

Thirty-four states have cement manufacturing plants. In 2013, the five leading cement-producing states, in descending order, were: Texas, California, Missouri, Florida, and Alabama. Together, the five accounted for almost half of US cement production. The list of top five cement-consuming states is similar: Texas, California, Florida, Ohio and Pennsylvania.

In 2015, about 10 percent of US cement consumption came from imports. The largest sources of US cement imports were Canada and Greece.

== Industry structure ==
In 2017, the top producers of portland cement in the US were:

- 1 - Holcim (now Holcim)
- 2 - Cemex
- 3 - Heidelberg Materials
- 4 - Buzzi Unicem
- 5 - Ash Grove Cement Company (to be acquired by CRH plc in early 2018)
- 6 - Argos USA Corp.
- 7 - Eagle Minerals Inc.
- 8 - CalPortland Co.
- 9 - Martin Marietta Materials, Inc.
- 10 - GCC of America, Inc.

In 2017, the top 5 companies produced 59 percent of US portland cement; the top 10 companies produced 79 percent.

== Inputs ==
Portland cement is a complex mixture, mostly calcium, with admixtures of aluminium, silica, and iron. The choice of source materials depends on local availability. The calcium is usually supplied by limestone, but sometimes shell or coral. Slightly clayey limestones are preferable, because they already contain the necessary aluminium. Cement cannot contain more than 5 percent magnesium, so the limestone must be low in magnesium.

Raw materials used in US cement production, 2013

Input	million metric tons
Limestone, shell, coral	91.5
Cement rock	9.4
Gypsum	4.0
Clay	3.3
Sand	3.1
Fly ash	2.7
Shale	2.1
Imported clinker	1.3
Other ash	1.0
All other materials	5.5
Total	123.9
Source: US Geological Survey, Minerals Yearbook, 2013.

Energy sources used in the US to manufacture cement in 2013 were:

- Coal 6.0 million metric tons
- Petroleum coke 1.6 million metric tons
- Solid waste 1.1 million metric tons
- Used tires 0.4 million metric tons
- Oil 15.7 million liters
- Liquid waste 0.8 million liters
- Natural gas 694 million cubic meters
- Electricity 10.5 billion kilowatt-hours

== Environmental Effects ==
The cement industry has both positive and negative effects on the environment.

=== Source of waste and pollutants ===
Cement manufacture is a source of the following airborne contaminants: particulate matter, nitrogen oxides, sulfur dioxide, carbon monoxide, and carbon dioxide.

Cement production releases carbon dioxide by sintering limestone or shells. It is also very energy-intensive, with the result that the cement industry is a large emitter of carbon dioxide.

=== Destruction of waste and pollutants ===
The high temperatures of cement kilns, the ability of concrete to incorporate different materials, and the stable and nonreactive nature of the concrete end product, all make cement kilns a desirable method for the destruction of hazardous waste.

Hazardous wastes efficiently destroyed by cement kilns include chlorinated solvents (methylene chloride, trichloroethylene, trichloromethane, trichloroethane, carbon tetrachloride, Freon-113), polychlorinated biphenyls (PCBs), dioxins, waste oil, and used hydrocarbon solvents. Whatever undesirable materials are not destroyed are locked in the finished concrete, a stable material with low permeability. Hydrocarbon waste and used tires contribute to the kiln heat, and reduces fuel use.

In addition to destruction of hazardous waste, waste materials from other industries, such as slag and fly ash, are commonly incorporated into cement, eliminating the need to landfill the waste. The ability of cement to incorporate different materials allows contaminated soil to be added to the feed, eliminating the need to take the material to a hazardous waste landfill. The US EPA estimated that in 2014, 13.1 million tons of coal fly ash, which otherwise would have to be landfilled, was beneficially used in cement. In addition, the use of fly ash improves the strength and durability of concrete

== See also ==
- American Concrete Institute
- Portland Cement Association
