= Friedel's salt =

Calcium chloroaluminate formed by reaction of AFm hydrates with chloride ions

Names
- IUPAC name Calcium chloroaluminate
- Other names Friedel's salt Calcium aluminium chlorohydrate Calcium aluminium chlorohydroxide Calcium aluminium oxychloride

Identifiers
CompTox Dashboard (EPA)	DTXSID901045141

Properties
Chemical formula	Ca_{2}Al(OH)_{6}(Cl, OH) · 2 H_{2}O
Appearance	White solid
- Except where otherwise noted, data are given for materials in their standard state (at 25 °C [77 °F], 100 kPa). verify (what is ?) Infobox references

Friedel's salt is an anion exchanger mineral belonging to the family of the layered double hydroxides (LDHs). It has affinity for anions as chloride and iodide and is capable of retaining them to a certain extent in its crystallographical structure.

== Composition ==
Friedel's salt is a layered double hydroxide (LDH) of general formula:

Ca_{2}Al(OH)_{6}(Cl, OH) · 2 H_{2}O

or more explicitly for a positively-charged LDH mineral:

[Ca_{2}Al(OH)_{6}]^{+} (Cl^{–}, OH^{–}) · 2 H_{2}O

or by directly incorporating water molecules into the Ca, Al hydroxide layer:

[Ca_{2}Al(OH)_{6} · 2 H_{2}O]^{+} (Cl^{–}, OH^{–})

where chloride and hydroxide anions occupy the interlayer to compensate the excess of positive charges.

In the cement chemist notation (CCN), considering that

2 OH^{−} ⇌ O^{2−} + H_{2}O,

and doubling all the stoichiometry, it could also be written in CCN as follows:

3CaO·Al_{2}O_{3}·Ca(O,Cl_{2}) · 11 H_{2}O

A simplified chemical composition with only Cl^{–} in the interlayer, and without OH^{–}, as:

Ca_{2}Al(OH)_{6}(Cl) · 2 H_{2}O

can be also written in cement chemist notation as:

3CaO·Al_{2}O_{3}·CaCl_{2} · 10 H_{2}O

Friedel's salt is formed in cements initially rich in tri-calcium aluminate (C_{3}A). Free-chloride ions directly bind with the AFm hydrates (C_{4}AH_{13} and its derivatives) to form Friedel's salt.

== Importance of chloride binding in AFm phases ==
Friedel's salt plays a main role in the binding and retention of chloride anions in cement and concrete. However, Friedel's salt remains a poorly understood phase in the CaO–Al_{2}O_{3}–CaCl_{2}–H_{2}O system. A sufficient understanding of the Friedel's salt system is essential to correctly model the reactive transport of chloride ions in reinforced concrete structures affected by chloride attack and steel reinforcement corrosion. It is also important to assess the long-term stability of salt-saturated Portland cement-based grouts to be used in engineering structures exposed to seawater or concentrated brine as it is the case for radioactive waste disposal in deep salt formations.

Another reason to study AFm phases and the Friedel's salt system is their tendency to bind, trap and to immobilise toxic anions, such as B(OH)^{−}_{4}, SeO^{2−}_{3}, and SeO^{2−}_{4}, or the long-lived radionuclide ^{129}I^{−}, in cementitious materials. Their characterization is important to conceive anion getters and to assess the retention capacity of cementitious buffer and concrete barriers used for radioactive waste disposal.

== Chloride sorption and anion exchange in AFm phases ==
Friedel's salt could be first tentatively represented as an AFm phase in which two chloride ions would have simply replaced one sulfate ion. This conceptual representation based on the intuition of a simple stoichiometric exchange is very convenient to remind but such a simple mechanism likely does not directly occur and must be considered with caution:

2 Cl^{−} + 3CaO·Al_{2}O_{3}·CaSO_{4} · 11 H_{2}O → 3CaO·Al_{2}O_{3}·CaCl_{2} · 11 H_{2}O + SO^{2−}_{4}

Indeed, the reality appears to be more complex than such a simple stoichiometric exchange between chloride and sulfate ions in the AFm crystal structure. In fact, it seems that chloride ions are electrostatically sorbed onto the positively charged [Ca_{2}Al(OH)_{6} · 2H_{2}O]^{+} layer of AFm hydrate, or could also exchange with hydroxide ions (OH^{–}) also present in the interlayer. So, the simple and "apparent" exchange reaction first presented here above for the sake of ease does not correspond to the reality and is an oversimplified representation.

Similarly, Kuzel’s salt could seem to be formed when only 1 Cl^{–} ion exchanges with 1/2 SO^{2−}_{4} in AFm (half substitution of sulfate ions):

1 Cl^{−} + 3CaO·Al_{2}O_{3}·CaSO_{4} · 11 H_{2}O → 3CaO·Al_{2}O_{3}·1/2CaSO_{4}·1/2CaCl_{2} · 11 H_{2}O + 1/2 SO^{2−}_{4}

Glasser et al. (1999) proposed to name this half-substituted salt in honor of his discoverer: Hans-Jürgen Kuzel.

However, Mesbah et al. (2011) have identified two different types of interlayers in the crystallographic structure they have determined and it precludes the common anion exchange reaction presented here above as stated by the authors themselves in their conclusions:

Kuzel's salt is a two-stage layered compound with two distinct interlayers, which are alternatively filled by chloride anions only (for one kind of interlayer) and by sulfate anions and water molecules (for the other kind of interlayer). Kuzel's salt structure is composed of the perfect intercalation of the Friedel's salt structure and the monosulfoaluminate structure (the two end-members of the studied bi-anionic AFm compound). The structural properties of Kuzel's salt explain the absence of extended chloride to sulfate or sulfate to chloride substitution.
The staging feature of Kuzel's salt certainly explains the difficulties to substitute chloride and sulfate: the modification in one kind of interlayer involves a modification in the other kind of interlayer in order to preserve the electroneutrality of the compound. The two-stage feature of Kuzel's salt implies that each interlayer should be mono-anionic.

So, if the global chemical composition of Friedel's salt and Kuzel's salt corresponds well respectively with the stoichiometry of a complete substitution, or a half substitution, of sulfate ions by chloride ions in the crystal structure of AFm, it does not tell directly anything on the exact mechanism of anion substitution in this complicated system. Only detailed and well controlled chloride sorption, or anion exchange, experiments with a complete analysis of all the dissolved species present in aqueous solution (also including OH^{–}, Na^{+} and Ca^{2+} ions) can decipher the system.

== Discovery ==
Friedel's salt discovery is relatively difficult to trace back from the recent literature, simply because it is an ancient finding of a poorly known and non-natural product. It has been synthesised and identified in 1897 by Georges Friedel, mineralogist and crystallographer, son of the famous French chemist Charles Friedel. Georges Friedel also synthesised calcium aluminate (1903) in the framework of his work on the macles theory (twin crystals). This point requires further verification.

== Formation ==
- Relation with Tricalcium aluminate.
- Incorporation of chloride.
- Solid solutions.

== See also ==
- AFm phases
- Aluminium chlorohydrate
- Cement
  - Sorel cement, a mixture of general formula: Mg_{4}Cl_{2}(OH)_{6}
  - Stanislas Sorel, a French engineer who made a new form of cement from a combination of magnesium oxide and magnesium chloride
- Concrete
  - Salt-concrete, also known as salzbeton
- Chloride
- Layered double hydroxides
- Tricalcium aluminate
- Friedel-Crafts reaction
- Friedel family, a rich lineage of French scientists:
  - Charles Friedel (1832–1899), French chemist known for the Friedel-Crafts reaction
  - Georges Friedel (1865–1933), here above mentioned, French crystallographer and mineralogist; son of Charles
  - Edmond Friedel (1895-1972) (1895–1972), French Polytechnician and mining engineer, founder of BRGM, the French geological survey; son of Georges
  - Jacques Friedel, (1921-2014), French physicist; son of Edmond, see the French site for Jacques Friedel
