= Elfi =

Elfi, Elfie and Elphie are feminine given names. Elfi is also a short form (hypocorism) of Elfriede. The name may refer to:

People:

- Elfriede Elfi von Dassanowsky (1924–2007), Austrian-born singer, pianist and film producer
- Elfie Donnelly (born 1950), British-Austrian writer, primarily of children's books
- Elfriede Elfi Eder (born 1970), Austrian former alpine skier
- Elfriede Elfi Graf (born 1964), Austrian singer
- Elfie Mayerhofer (1917–1992), Austrian film actress and singer
- Elfi Schlegel (born 1964), Canadian sportscaster and former gymnast
- Elfi Zinn (born 1953), German middle distance runner

Fictional characters:

- Elphie, a nickname of Elphaba, in the novel Wicked: The Life and Times of the Wicked Witch of the West and Wicked, the musical based on it
- Elphie, an elephant in City of Friends, a Norwegian animated children's series
- the title character of Elfie Hopkins, a 2012 British horror film
- the title character of Sango-sho Densetsu: Aoi Umi no Erufii, Coral Reef Legend: Elfie of the Blue Sea in English.

== See also ==
- Elbphilharmonie, a concert building i Hamburg, Germany nicknamed 'Elphi'
