= Elfriede =

Elfreda
- Gender: Female

Origin
- Origin: Germanic
- Meaning: elf-strength

Elfriede, also known as Elfreda, Elfrida, Alfrida, Aelfrida, Elfrieda, Elftrude, Elftraut among other variants, is a female given name, derived from Ælfþryð (Aelfthryth) meaning "elf-strength". The name fell out of fashion in the Middle Ages and was revived in the 19th century in both England and Germany. Although some of its modern forms like Alfieda can be mistaken for feminine versions of Alfred, that derives from Ælfræd ('elf-counsel' or 'wise-elf'). The Southern German diminutive Friedel or Friedl is nowadays more common than the full name.

== Medieval ==
- Saint Ælfflæd of Whitby, daughter of King Oswiu of Northumbria and Eanflæd, abbess of Whitby Abbey (654–714)
- Saint Ælfthryth of Crowland (died c. 795)
- Ælfthryth, wife of King Coenwulf of Mercia (fl. 810s)
- Ælfthryth, Countess of Flanders, daughter of King Alfred the Great (d. 929)
- Elftrude, daughter of Adele of Vermandois and Arnulf I, Count of Flanders (10th century)
- Ælfthryth, wife of Edgar, king of England, mother of Ethelred the Unready (d. 1000)

== Modern ==
- Elfrida Andrée (1841–1929), Swedish organist, composer and conductor
- Elfrida De Renne Barrow (1884–1970), American author and poet
- Elfriede Elfi von Dassanowsky (1924–2007), Austrian-born singer, pianist and film producer
- Elfriede Elfi Eder (born 1970), Austrian former alpine skier
- Elfriede Florin (1912–2006), German actress
- Elfriede Geiringer (1905–1998), Austrian Holocaust survivor, second wife of Otto Frank, father of Anne Frank
- Elfriede Gerstl (1932–2009), Austrian author and Holocaust survivor
- Elfriede Elfi Graf (born 1964), Austrian singer
- Elfriede Jelinek (born 1946), Austrian playwright, 2004 Nobel laureate in Literature
- Elfriede Lender (1882–1974), Estonian teacher and pedagogue
- Elfrida Pigou (1911–1960), Canadian mountaineer
- Elfrida Rathbone (1871–1940), English educationist
- Elfriede Rinkel (nee Huth) (1922–2018), guard at the Ravensbrück concentration camp
- Elfriede Saarik (1916–1983), Estonian dancer and stage actress
- Elfriede Scholz (1903–1943), German victim of Nazi persecution, sister of author Erich Maria Remarque
- Alfreda "Freda" Simmonds (1912–1983), New Zealand artist
- Elfriede Trötschel (1913–1958), German soprano
- Elfriede Tungl (1922–1981) Austrian civil engineer.
- Elfrida Vipont, pen name of Elfrida Vipont Foulds (1902–1992), British author of children's books

== See also ==
- Aelfrida Tillyard (1883-1959), British author, medium and self-styled mystic
