= Salt-concrete =

Building material used in salt mines

Salt-concrete (or salzbeton) is a building material that is used to reduce the water inflow in mining shafts in salt mines. It is composed of 16% cement, 39% halite, 16% limestone powder, 14% water and 15% sand.

== History ==
Salt-concrete was used for the first time in 1984 in the potash mine in Rocanville in Canada. A salt-concrete seal was also installed in the Asse II mine in Lower Saxony in 1995.

== Filling tunnels ==
Since the end of the repository for radioactive waste Morsleben in 1998, the salt dome stability deteriorated to a state where it could collapse. Since 2003, a volume of 480,000 m^{3} of salt-concrete has been pumped into the pit to temporarily stabilize the upper levels. In addition another 4,000,000 m^{3} of salt-concrete will be used to temporarily stabilize the lower levels.

== See also ==
- Friedel's salt – Calcium chloroaluminate formed by reaction of AFm hydrates with chloride ions
  - synthesized first by Georges Friedel
- Sorel cement – Magnesium-based cement: 1 part MgCl2 for 3 or 5 parts of Mg(OH)2
  - produced first by Stanislas Sorel
- Saltcrete – Mixture of cement with salts and brine
