= Friedell =

Friedell is a surname. Notable people with the surname include:

- Egon Friedell (1878–1938), Austrian cultural historian, playwright, actor and Kabarett performer, journalist and theatre critic
- Harold Friedell (1905–1958), American organist
- Wilhelm L. Friedell (1883–1958), American rear admiral

== See also ==
- Friedel, another surname
