= Friedel family =

Family of French scientists

The Friedel family is a French family that produced several notable scientists over four generations, in a direct lineage from the chemist Charles Friedel to the physicist Jacques Friedel.

- Charles Friedel (1832–1899), chemist known for the Friedel–Crafts reaction; great-grandfather of Jacques
- Georges Friedel (1865–1933), crystallographer and mineralogist, known for his work on liquid crystals; son of Charles
- Edmond Friedel (1895–1972), mining engineer who directed the École des Mines de Paris; son of Georges
- Jacques Friedel (1921–2014), physicist; son of Edmond

A French botanist, Jean Friedel (1874–1941), is also recorded as a son of Charles Friedel.

== See also ==
- Friedel's law, a property of crystal diffraction named after Georges Friedel
- Friedel's salt, a layered double hydroxide mineral named after Georges Friedel
