= Friede =

Friede may refer to:

- Friede (name), a given name and surname
- Friede (Woman in the Moon), a fictional spacecraft
- Sister Friede, a character in Dark Souls III: Ashes of Ariandel
