= Tiocem =

TioCem is a specialized cement with photocatalytic features, used on the surface of buildings to reduce air pollution caused by exposure of the cement to ultraviolet light (UV).

== Technology ==
Photocatalysis is initiated by titanium dioxide (TiO_{2}), which is added during the cement's production. Typical properties (i.e. strength) of cement applications (such as concrete) will be added to clean the air around the photocatalytic surface. Nitrogen dioxide (NO_{2}) will be particularly abated when daylight activates the photocatalytic surfaces.

The chemical process may be summarized as follows:

- Titanium dioxide (TiO_{2}) absorbs energy (UV radiation) and excites electrons (e-)

TiO_{2} + hν -> TiO_{2} + h+ + e-

- Oxygen existing in the air (O_{2}) reacts with electrons (e-), generating super-oxide ions (O_{2}-)
- Super-oxide ions (O_{2}-) react with hydrogen ions (H+), generating the reactive hydroxyl radicals (OH•)

H_{2}O + h+ -> H+ + OH-

- Nitrogen dioxide (NO_{2}) reacts with the pollutant remover (OH•) and generates nitrate (NO_{3}-), which reacts with the cement surface and is dissolved by water.

Using materials like TioCem, the abatement of NO_{2} could be measured by a test method using the Italian standard UNI 11247, which is being discussed as the basis of a European standard. This method involves test apparatus in which a mixture of air and pollutant flows in a chamber over a test object; the pollutant burden is measured with (and without) exposure to light. A defined level of NO_{2} abatement is guaranteed by the label “TX Active” (plus an initial) and replication of the test results. Proof of the effective reduction of oxide-of-nitrogen exposure has been furnished under close-to-practical conditions by the PICADA (Photocatalytic Innovative Coverings Applications for Depollution Assessment) Project (supported by the European Union and other studies.

== Applications ==
Since the photocatalytic effect is needed only on the surface of a building which is exposed to UV, Tiocem is used primarily in the top layer of a two-layer surface.

The most effective fields for application are:

- Pavement (stones and slabs)
- Roofing tiles
- Noise and screen barriers
- Facades (wall cladding)
- Rendering (dry mortar/exterior cement plaster)
- Road construction (e.g. whitetopping)

The abatement of NO_{2} varies with changing climatic conditions. Field tests were carried out with pavements in Bergamo, Italy, on the inside walls of a tunnel in Rome and stucco in Stockholm. In all cases, the requirements of TX Active for NO_{2} abatement were met.

== See also ==
- Cement
