= Tomas Lindahl =

Swedish-British scientist

Tomas Lindahl FRS FMedSci
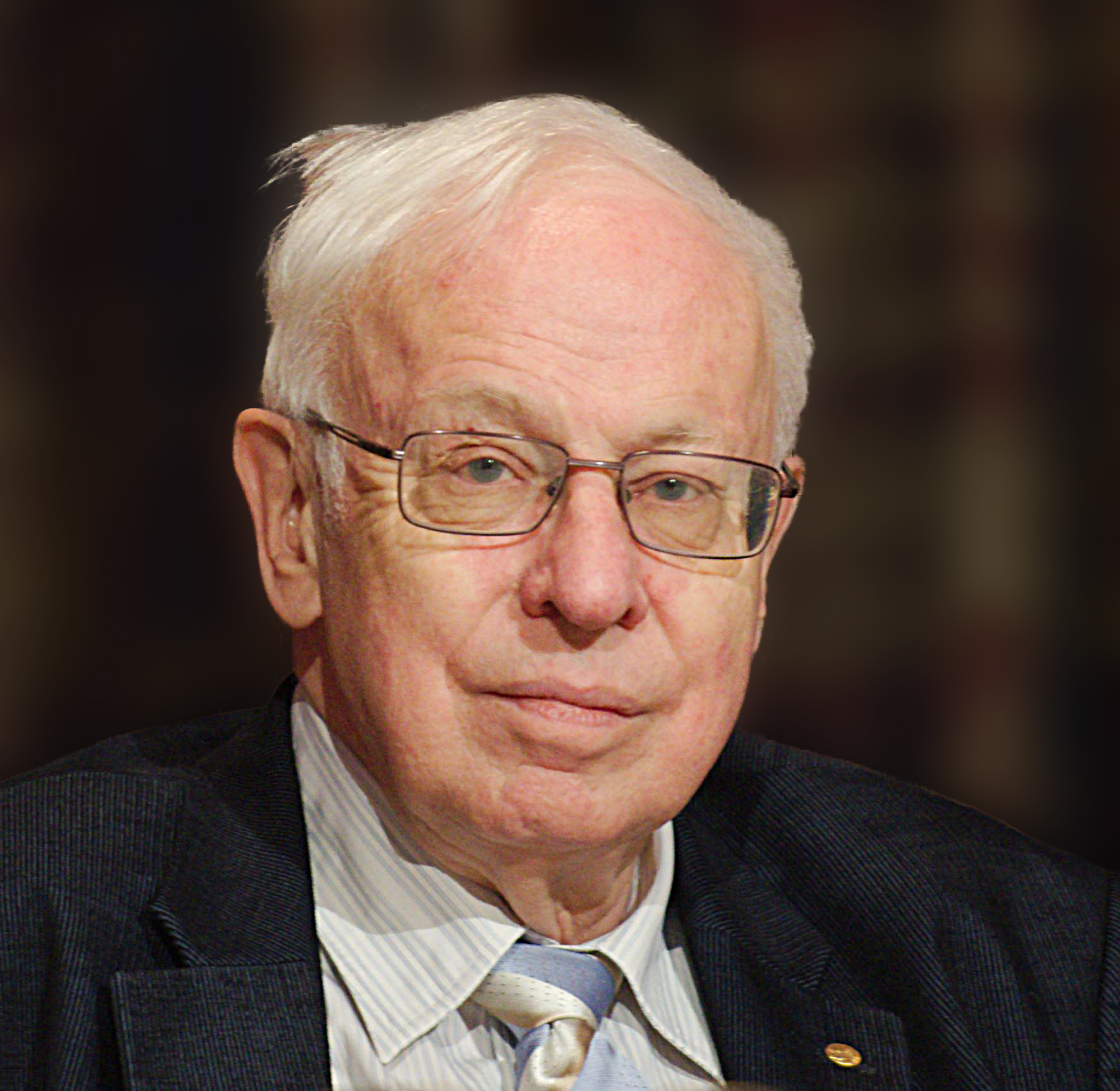
- Lindahl in 2015
- Born: Tomas Robert Lindahl; 28 January 1938 (age 88); Stockholm, Sweden
- Citizenship: Swedish, naturalised British (dual nationality)
- Education: Karolinska Institutet (PhD)
- Known for: Clarification of cellular resistance to carcinogens
- Awards: EMBO Membership (1974); FRS (1988); FMedSci (1998); Royal Medal (2007); Copley Medal (2010); Nobel Prize in Chemistry (2015)
- Scientific career
- Fields: Cancer research; DNA repair
- Workplaces: Francis Crick Institute; London Research Institute; University of Gothenburg; Princeton University; Rockefeller University
- Thesis: On the structure and stability of nucleic acids in solution (1967)
- Website: crick.ac.uk/research/a-z-researchers/emeritus-scientists/tomas-lindahl/

Tomas Robert Lindahl (born 28 January 1938) is a Swedish-British scientist specialising in cancer research. In 2015, he was awarded the Nobel Prize in Chemistry jointly with American chemist Paul L. Modrich and Turkish chemist Aziz Sancar for mechanistic studies of DNA repair.

== Education ==
Lindahl was born in Kungsholmen, Stockholm, Sweden to Folke Robert Lindahl and Ethel Hulda Hultberg. He received a PhD degree in 1967, and an MD degree qualification in 1970, from the Karolinska Institutet in Stockholm.

== Career and research ==
After obtaining his research doctorate, Lindahl did postdoctoral research at Princeton University and Rockefeller University. He was professor of medical chemistry at the University of Gothenburg from 1978 to 1982. After moving to the United Kingdom he joined the Imperial Cancer Research Fund (now Cancer Research UK) as a researcher in 1981. From 1986 to 2005 he was the first Director of Cancer Research UK's Clare Hall Laboratories in Hertfordshire, which since 2015 has been part of the Francis Crick Institute. He continued to research there until 2009. He has contributed to many papers on DNA repair and the genetics of cancer.

== Awards and honours ==
Lindahl was elected an EMBO Member in 1974 and Fellow of the Royal Society (FRS) in 1988, his certificate of election reads:

Dr. Tomas Lindahl is noted for his contributions to the comprehension of DNA repair at the molecular level in bacterial and mammalian cells. He was the first to isolate a mammalian DNA ligase and to describe a totally unanticipated novel group of DNA glycosylases as mediators of DNA excision repair. He has also discovered a unique class of enzymes in mammalian cells, namely the methyltransferases, which mediate the adaptive response to alkylation of DNA and has shown that the expression of these enzymes is regulated by the ada gene. More recently he has elucidated the molecular defect in Blooms syndrome [sic] to be the lack of DNA ligase I. Apart from providing profound insights into the nature of the DNA repair process his very important contributions promise to facilitate the design of more selective chemotherapeutic drugs for the treatment of cancer. Lindahl has also made a number of significant contributions to understanding at the DNA level the mechanism of transformation of B-lymphocytes by the Epstein-Barr virus. The most notable of these was the first description of the occurrence in lymphoid cells of closed circular duplex viral DNA.

Lindahl received the Royal Society's Royal Medal in 2007 "making fundamental contributions to our understanding of DNA repair. His achievements stand out for their great originality, breadth and lasting influence." He is a member of the Norwegian Academy of Science and Letters. He was awarded the Copley Medal in 2010. He was elected a founding Fellow of the Academy of Medical Sciences (FMedSci) in 1998. In 2018, he was elected a foreign associate of the National Academy of Sciences.

He shared the Nobel Prize in Chemistry in 2015. The Swedish Academy noted that "The Nobel Prize in Chemistry 2015 was awarded jointly to Tomas Lindahl, Paul Modrich and Aziz Sancar 'for mechanistic studies of DNA repair'."
