= Sorel cement =

Magnesium-based cement: 1 part MgCl2 for 3 or 5 parts of Mg(OH)2

Sorel cement (also known as magnesia cement or magnesium oxychloride) is a non-hydraulic cement first produced by the French chemist Stanislas Sorel in 1867.

In fact, in 1855, before working with magnesium compounds, Stanislas Sorel first developed a two-component cement by mixing zinc oxide powder with a solution of zinc chloride. In a few minutes he obtained a dense material harder than limestone.

Only a decade later, Sorel replaced zinc with magnesium in his formula and also obtained a cement with similar favorable properties. This new type of cement was stronger and more elastic than Portland cement, and therefore exhibited a more resilient behavior when submitted to shocks. The material could be easily molded like plaster when freshly prepared, or machined on a lathe after setting and hardening. It was very hard, could be easily bound to many different types of materials (good adhesive properties), and colored with pigments. Therefore, it was used to make mosaics and to mimic marble. After mixing with cotton crushed in powder, it was also used as a surrogate material for ivory to fabricate billiard balls resistant to shock.

Sorel cement is a mixture of magnesium oxide (burnt magnesia) with magnesium chloride with the approximate chemical formula Mg_{4}Cl_{2}(OH)_{6}(H_{2}O)_{8}, or MgCl_{2}·3Mg(OH)_{2}·8H_{2}O, corresponding to a weight ratio of 2.5–3.5 parts MgO to one part MgCl_{2}.

Charles A. Sorrell also studied the topic and published works on the same family of oxychloride compounds based on zinc and magnesium in 1977 and 1980. The zinc oxychloride cement is prepared from zinc oxide and zinc chloride instead of magnesium compounds.

== Composition and structure ==
The set cement consists chiefly of a mixture of magnesium oxychlorides and magnesium hydroxide in varying proportions, depending on the initial cement formulation, setting time, and other variables. The main stable oxychlorides at ambient temperature are the so-called "phase 3" and "phase 5", whose formulas can be written as 3Mg(OH)_{2}·MgCl_{2}·8H_{2}O and 5Mg(OH)_{2}·MgCl_{2}·8H_{2}O, respectively; or, equivalently, Mg_{2}(OH)_{3}Cl·4H_{2}O and Mg_{3}(OH)_{5}Cl·4H_{2}O.

Phase 5 crystallizes mainly as long needles which are actually rolled-up sheets. These interlocking needles give the cement its strength.

In the long term the oxychlorides absorb and react with carbon dioxide CO_{2} from the air to form magnesium chlorocarbonates.

== History ==
These compounds are the primary components of matured Sorel cement, first prepared in 1867 by Stanislas Sorel.

In the late 19th century, several attempts were made to determine the composition of the hardened Sorel's cement, but the results were not conclusive. Phase 3 was properly isolated and described by Robinson and Waggaman (1909), and phase 5 was identified by Lukens (1932).

== Properties ==
Sorel cement can withstand 10,000–12,000 psi (69–83 MPa) of compressive force whereas standard Portland cement can typically only withstand 7,000–8,000 psi (48–55 MPa). It also achieves high strength in a shorter time.

Sorel cement has a remarkable capacity to bond with, and contain, other materials. It also exhibits some elasticity, an interesting property increasing its capacity to resist shocks (better mechanical resilience), particularly useful for billiard balls.

The pore solution in wet Sorel cement is slightly alkaline (pH 8.5 to 9.5), but significantly less so than that of Portland cement (hyperalkaline conditions: pH 12.5 to 13.5).

Other differences between magnesium-based cements and portland cement include water permeability, preservation of plant and animal substances, and corrosion of metals. These differences make different construction applications suitable.

Prolonged exposure of Sorel cement to water leaches out the soluble MgCl_{2}, leaving hydrated brucite Mg(OH)_{2} as the binding phase, which without absorption of CO_{2}, can result in loss of strength.

== Fillers and reinforcement ==
In use, Sorel cement is usually combined with filler materials such as gravel, sand, marble flour, asbestos, wood particles and expanded clays.

Sorel cement is incompatible with steel reinforcement because the presence of chloride ions in the pore solution and the low alkalinity (pH < 9) of the cement promote steel corrosion (pitting corrosion). However, the low alkalinity makes it more compatible with glass fiber reinforcement. It is also better than Portland cement as a binder for wood composites, since its setting is not retarded by the lignin and other wood chemicals.

The resistance of the cement to water can be improved with the use of additives such as phosphoric acid, soluble phosphates, fly ash, or silica.

== Uses ==
Magnesium oxychloride cement is used to make floor tiles and industrial flooring, in fire protection, wall insulation panels, and as a binder for grinding wheels. Due to its resemblance to marble, it is also used for artificial stones, artificial ivory (e.g. for billiard balls) and other similar purposes.

Sorel cement has also been studied as a candidate material for chemical buffers and engineered barriers (drift seals made of salt-concrete) for deep geological repositories of high-level nuclear waste in salt-rock formations (Waste Isolation Pilot Plant (WIPP) in New Mexico, United States; Asse II salt mine, Gorleben and Morsleben in Germany). Phase 5 of magnesium oxychloride could be a useful complement, or replacement, for the MgO (periclase) presently used as a CO_{2} getter in the WIPP disposal chambers to limit the solubility of minor actinides carbonate complexes, while establishing moderately alkaline conditions (pH: 8.5–9.5) still compatible with the undisturbed geochemical conditions initially prevailing in situ in the salt formations. The much more soluble calcium oxide and hydroxide (portlandite) are not authorized in WIPP (New Mexico) because they would impose a too high pH (12.5). Since Mg^{2+} is the second most-abundant cation present in sea water, after Na^{+}, and magnesium compounds are less soluble than those of calcium, magnesium-based buffer materials and Sorel cement are considered more appropriate backfill materials for radioactive waste disposal in deep salt formations than common calcium-based cements (Portland cement and their derivatives). Moreover, as magnesium hydroxychloride is also a pH buffer in marine evaporite brines, Sorel cement is not expected to disturb initial in situ conditions prevailing in deep salts formations.

During WW II, Blohm&Voss made a gliding bomb, BV-246, with wings made of Sorel cement.

== Preparation ==
Sorel cement is usually prepared by mixing finely divided MgO powder with a concentrated solution of MgCl_{2}.

In theory, the ingredients should be combined in the molar proportions of phase 5, which has the best mechanical properties. However, the chemical reactions that create the oxychlorides may not run to completion, leaving unreacted MgO particles and/or MgCl_{2} in pore solution. While the former acts as an inert filler, leftover chloride is undesirable since it promotes corrosion of steel in contact with the cement. Excess water may also be necessary to achieve a workable consistency. Therefore, in practice the proportions of magnesium oxide and water in the initial mix are higher than those in pure phase 5. In one study, the best mechanical properties were obtained with a molar ratio MgO:MgCl_{2} of 13:1 (instead of the stoichiometry 5:1).

== Production ==
Periclase (MgO) and magnesite (MgCO_{3}) are not abundant raw materials, so their manufacture into Sorel cement is expensive and limited to specialized niche applications requiring modest materials quantities. China is the dominant supplier of raw materials for the production of magnesium oxide and derivatives. Some magnesium-based "green cements" are derived from the more abundant dolomite (CaMg(CO_{3})_{2}) combined with 50 wt. % calcium carbonate. These should not be confused with the original Sorel cement, as the latter is pure magnesium oxychloride, and does not contain calcium oxide.

== See also ==
- Binder (material)
- Magnesium oxychloride
- Friedel's salt
- Salt-concrete
- Periclase (MgO)
