= Slater–Pauling rule =

Rule in condensed matter physics

In condensed matter physics, the Slater–Pauling rule states that adding an element to a metal alloy will reduce the alloy's saturation magnetization by an amount proportional to the number of valence electrons outside of the added element's d shell. Conversely, elements with a partially filled d shell will increase the magnetic moment by an amount proportional to number of missing electrons. Investigated by the physicists John C. Slater and Linus Pauling in the 1930s, the rule is a useful approximation for the magnetic properties of many transition metals.

== Application ==
The use of the rule depends on carefully defining what it means for an electron to lie outside of the d shell. The electrons outside a d shell are the electrons which have higher energy than the electrons within the d shell. The Madelung rule (incorrectly) suggests that the s shell is filled before the d shell. For example, it predicts Zinc has a configuration of [Ar] 4s^{2} 3d^{10}. However, Zinc's 4s electrons actually have more energy than the 3d electrons, putting them outside the d shell. Ordered in terms of energy, the electron configuration of Zinc is [Ar] 3d^{10} 4s^{2}. (see: the n+ℓ energy ordering rule)

Slater–Pauling rule (nearest integer)
Element	Electron configuration	Magnetic valence	Predicted moment per atom
Tin	[Kr] 4d^{10} 5s^{2} 5p^{2}	-4	-4 $\mu_\mathrm{B}$
Aluminum	[Ne] 3s^{2} 3p^{1}	-3	-3 $\mu_\mathrm{B}$
Zinc	[Ar] 3d^{10} 4s^{2}	-2	-2 $\mu_\mathrm{B}$
Copper	[Ar] 3d^{10} 4s^{1}	-1	-1 $\mu_\mathrm{B}$
Palladium	[Kr] 4d^{10}	0	0 $\mu_\mathrm{B}$
Cobalt	[Ar] 3d^{7} 4s^{2}	+1	+1 $\mu_\mathrm{B}$
Iron	[Ar] 3d^{6} 4s^{2}	+2	+2 $\mu_\mathrm{B}$
Manganese	[Ar] 3d^{5} 4s^{2}	+3	+3 $\mu_\mathrm{B}$

The basic rule given above makes several approximations. One simplification is rounding to the nearest integer. Because we are describing the number of electrons in a band using an average value, the s and d shells can be filled to non-integer numbers of electrons, allowing the Slater–Pauling rule to give more accurate predictions. While the Slater–Pauling rule has many exceptions, it is often a useful as an approximation to more accurate, but more complicated physical models.

Building on further theoretical developments done by physicists such as Jacques Friedel, a more widely applicable version of the rule, known as the generalized Slater–Pauling rule was developed.

== See also ==
- Spin states (d electrons)
- Ferromagnetism
- Metallic bonding
