= John Steeds (scientist) =

British physicist and materials scientist

John Steeds FRS FInstP
- Born: 9 February 1940 (age 86); London, England
- Education: University College London (BSc); University of Cambridge (PhD)
- Awards: FRS (1988); Holweck Prize (1996)
- Scientific career
- Fields: condensed matter physics; materials science
- Workplaces: University of Bristol
- Doctoral advisor: Archibald Howie

John Wickham Steeds FRS FInstP (born 9 February 1940) is a British physicist and materials scientist. He is an Emeritus Professor of Physics at the University of Bristol.

== Research ==
Steeds is best known for his investigations of the microstructure of materials using electron microscopy and convergent-beam electron diffraction. Early in his career, he produced seminal work on dislocation arrangements in deformed copper crystals, which is a basis for the more recent theories of work hardening. His monograph on anisotropic elasticity theory of dislocations is a standard reference. He has led a sophisticated research effort to make, from image plane diffraction analysis ("real-space crystallography") and convergent-beam diffraction, a complete system for crystallographic structure determination in the electron microscope. He is recognised as a world expert in this technique.

Significant applications include precipitate structure in steels, new phases in the contact regions of integrated circuits and the correction of important errors in the structure of transition metal dichalcogenides. With the first observation of solitons (discommensurations) in the stripe and triply incommensurate states of these layer compounds, he has produced dynamic images of the basic phase-transition mechanisms.

== Awards and honours ==
Steeds was elected a Fellow of the Royal Society (FRS) in 1988. In 1996, he received the Holweck Medal, awarded jointly by the Institute of Physics and Société Française de Physique.
