= Co-processing =

Use of waste as raw material or energy source

Co-processing is the use of waste as raw material, or as a source of energy, or both to replace natural mineral resources (material recycling) and fossil fuels such as coal, petroleum and gas (energy recovery) in industrial processes, mainly in energy intensive industries (EII) such as cement, lime, steel, glass, and power generation. Waste materials used for Co-processing are referred to as alternative fuels and raw materials (AFR).

== Concept of Co-processing ==
Co-processing is a proven sustainable development concept that reduces demands on natural resources, reduces pollution and landfill space, thus contributing to reducing the environmental footprint. Co-processing is also based on the principles of industrial ecology, which considers the best features of the flow of information, materials, and energy of biological ecosystems, with the aim of improving the exchange of these essential resources in the industrial world.

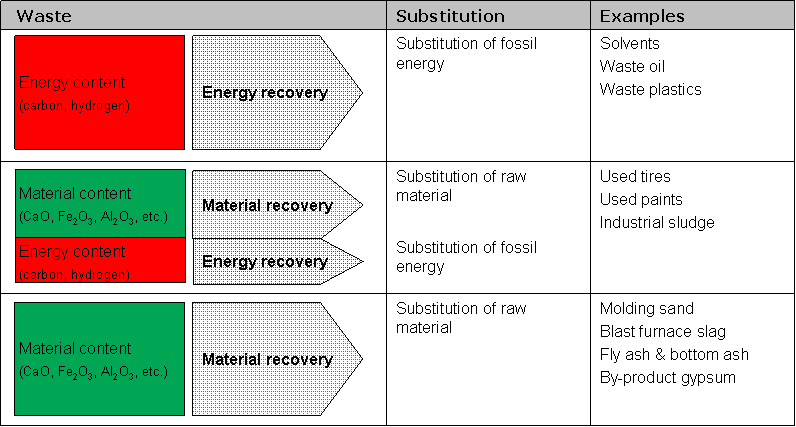

Figure 1: Types of Co-processing

In summary, the benefits of Co-processing are:

- to conserve natural (non-renewable) resources of energy and materials,
- to reduce emissions of greenhouse gases in order to slow global warming and demonstrate a positive impact on integrated environmental indicators, such as the ecological footprint,
- to reduce the environmental impacts of the extraction (mining or quarrying), transporting, and processing of raw materials,
- to reduce dependence on primary resource markets,
- to save landfill space and reduce the pollution caused by the disposal of waste, and
- to destroy waste eliminating potential future liabilities.

Co-processing contributes to the industrial competitiveness, is a complementary technology to concepts such as cleaner production or recycling and should be considered as a treatment alternative within an integrated waste management concept. Some EII offer co-processing as a sustainable waste management service. It is usually more cost effective to adapt existing facilities of EII than building new waste treatment capacities thereby reducing waste management cost to society.

The waste management hierarchy (see figure below) shows that Co-processing is a recovery activity which should be considered after waste prevention and recycling; Co-processing ranks higher in this hierarchy in comparison to disposal activities such as landfilling or incineration.

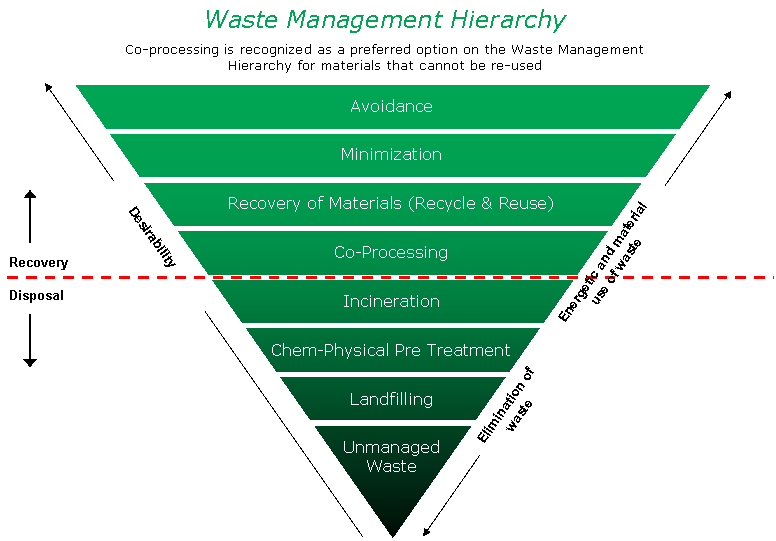

Figure 2: Waste Management Hierarchy

== Potential of Co-processing ==
The global industrial demand for energy is roughly 45% of the total demand and the requirements of the energy intensive industries (EII) are more than half of the total industrial demand, at 27%.

Worldwide, wastes suitable for Co-processing have an energy potential equivalent to nearly 20% of the fossil fuel energy used by the EII and coal-fired power plants. By 2030, the thermal substitution rate of waste could rise to nearly 30%. In the EU-25 countries of Europe, the available energy potential in waste currently represents nearly 40% of this demand, and this is expected to rise to almost 50% by 2030.

The EU cement industry already uses more than 40% fuels derived from waste and biomass in supplying the thermal energy to the grey clinker making process. Although the choice for this so-called alternative fuels (AF) is typically cost driven, other factors are becoming more important. Use of AF provides benefits for both society and the company: CO_{2}-emissions are lower than with fossil fuels, waste can be co-processed in an efficient and sustainable manner and the demand for certain virgin materials can be reduced. Yet there are large differences in the share of AF used between the European Union (EU) member states. Clearly, the societal benefits can be enlarged if more member states increase their AF share. In this study Ecofys assess the barriers and opportunities for further uptake of AF in 14 EU member states. Ecofys found that local factors constrain the market potential to a much larger extent than the technical and economic feasibility of the cement industry itself. In this summary they present the overall findings. The detailed assessments are available in separate cases studies.Source

Roughly 60% of the waste that could be used for Co-processing is biomass and therefore carbon neutral. In this way Co-processing offers a significant potential for the reduction of greenhouse gas emissions from fossil fuels. Furthermore, diverting industrial waste streams from landfills and incinerators without energy recovery contributes to reducing overall CO_{2} emissions when used to substitute fossil fuels through Co-processing (as illustrated in the figure below).

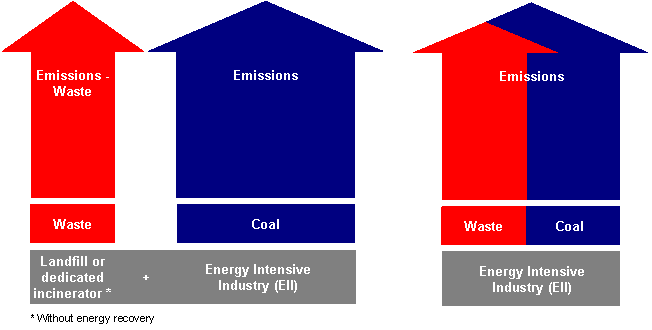

Figure 3: Reduction of Emissions through Co-processing

Other factors that must be considered when Co-processing waste include product quality standards, permitting aspects, and transparent communication in order to gain public acceptance.

== Coprocessing in pharmaceutical excipients development ==
Coprocessing is the combination of two or more excipients to form materials (coprocessed excipients) of superior functionality and limited unwanted effects. Co-processing is a tool that is employed by pharmaceutical excipients manufacturers and formulation scientists to develop materials with superior performance. Coprocessing is fundamentally based on particle engineering that allows modification of Critical Material Attributes (CMA) of the primary excipients. These modifications are reflected in the resulting coprocessed material as enhanced functionality. The primary excipients are established pharmacopoeial materials.
