= Freidel =

Freidel is a surname. Notable people with the surname include:

- David Freidel (born 1946), American archaeologist
- Frank Freidel (1916–1993), American historian
- Laurent Freidel (fl. 1994), French physicist

== See also ==
- Friedel
