= List of fellows of the Royal Society elected in 1988 =

This is a list of fellows of the Royal Society elected in 1988.

== Fellows ==
1. Janis Antonovics
2. Athelstan Laurence Johnson Beckwith (1930–2010)
3. Sidney van den Bergh
4. Derek Bradley
5. Nam-Hai Chua
6. Alan Cowey (1935–2012)
7. Alan Herbert Cowley
8. Keith Gordon Cox (1933–1998)
9. Lionel Vivian Crawford
10. David Olaf Edwards
11. Charles Thomas Elliott
12. Trevor Evans (1927–2010)
13. James T. Fitzsimons
14. Margaret Mary Gowing (1921–1998) (statute 12)
15. John Edwin (Jack) Harris
16. Alan Kenneth Head (1925–2010)
17. Sir Brian Hoskins
18. Noel Hush
19. Jacob Israelachvili
20. George Kalmus
21. Henricus Gerardus Jacobus Maria Kuypers (1925–1989)
22. Tomas Lindahl
23. Alan Lindsay Mackay
24. Robin Milner(1934–2010)
25. Ashesh Prosad Mitra (1927–2007)
26. Salvador Moncada
27. John Gareth Morris
28. Howard Redfern Morris
29. John Graham Nicholls
30. John Joseph Thomas Owen
31. Barbara Pearse
32. Hugh Pelham
33. William Geraint Price
34. Philip Geoffrey Saffman (1931–2008)
35. Conjeeveram Srirangachari Seshadri
36. Eric Manvers Shooter
37. David Smith
38. Robert Stephen John Sparks
39. John Wickham Steeds
40. Robert Henry Symons(1934–2006)
41. Jeffrey Clifton Watkins

== Foreign members ==
1. Vladimir Igorevich Arnold (1937–2010)
2. Christian de Duve (1917–2013)
3. Jacques Friedel (1921–2014)
4. Ernst Mayr (1904–2005)
5. Henry Taube (1915–2005)
6. Howard Martin Temin (1934–1994)
