= Magnesium hydroxychloride =

Class of chemical compounds

Magnesium hydroxychloride is the traditional term for several chemical compounds of magnesium, chlorine, oxygen, and hydrogen whose general formula xMgO·yMgCl_{2}·zH_{2}O, for various values of x, y, and z; or, equivalently, Mg_{x+y}(OH)_{2x}Cl_{2y}(H_{2}O)_{z−x}. The simple chemical formula that is often used is Mg(OH)Cl, which appears in high school subject, for example.Other names for this class are magnesium chloride hydroxide, magnesium oxychloride, and basic magnesium chloride. Some of these compounds are major components of Sorel cement.

== Compounds ==
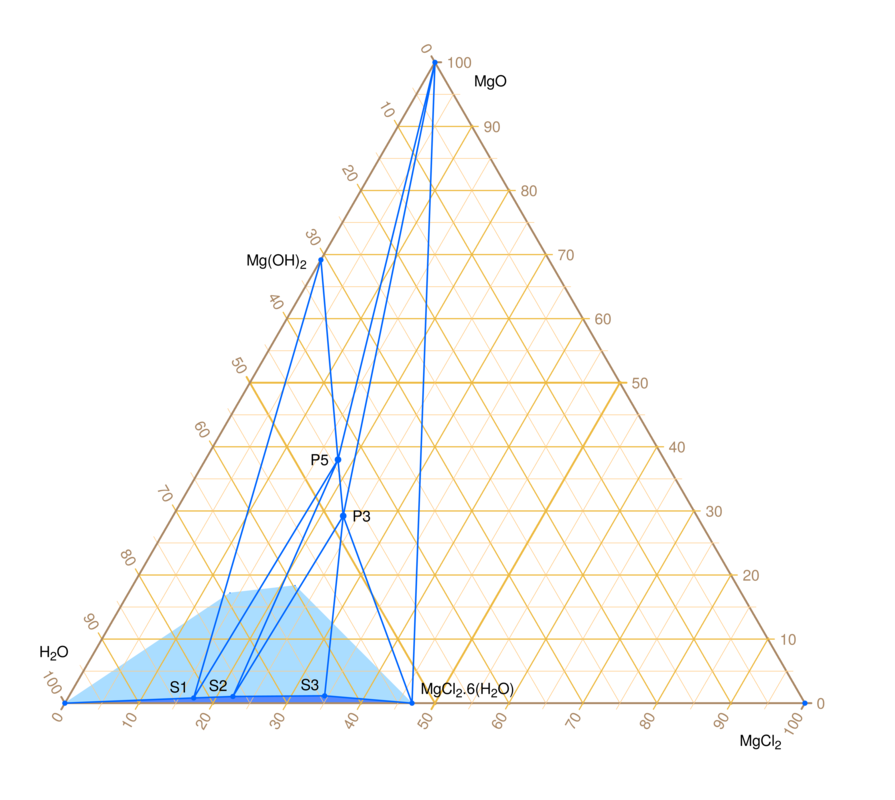
Phase diagram for the ternary system MgO – MgCl_{2} – H_{2}O at ~ 23 °C. The stable oxychloride phases are P5 (Phase 5, 5:1:8) and P3 (phase 3, 3:1:8). The dark blue region is clear solution. The triple equilibrium points of the saturated solution are S1 (Sol:Mg(OH)_{2}:P5), S2 (Sol:P5:P3), and S3 (Sol:P3:MgCl_{2}·6H_{2}O). The light blue region is the approximate range of compositions of homogeneous metastable gels.

The ternary diagram of the system MgO – MgCl_{2} – H_{2}O has the following well-defined and stable phases:

- Mg(OH)_{2} (magnesium hydroxide, the mineral brucite)
- 2Mg(OH)_{2}·MgCl_{2}·4H_{2}O = Mg_{3}(OH)_{4}Cl_{2}·4H_{2}O ("phase 2", "2:1:4")
- 3Mg(OH)_{2}·MgCl_{2}·8H_{2}O = 2Mg_{2}(OH)_{3}Cl·4H_{2}O ("phase 3", "3:1:8")
- 5Mg(OH)_{2}·MgCl_{2}·8H_{2}O = 2Mg_{3}(OH)_{5}Cl·4H_{2}O ("Phase 5", "5:1:8")
- 9Mg(OH)_{2}·MgCl_{2}·5H_{2}O = Mg_{10}(OH)_{18}Cl_{2}·5H_{2}O ("Phase 9", "9:1:5")
- MgCl_{2}·6H_{2}O (magnesium chloride hexahydrate)

Phase 3 and phase 5 may exist at ambient temperature, whereas the phase 2 and phase 9 are stable only at temperatures above 100 °C. All these compounds are colorless crystalline solids.

At ambient temperature, there are also gel-like homogeneous phases that form initially when the reagents are mixed, and eventually crystallize as phase 5, phase 3, or mixtures with Mg(OH)_{2} or MgCl_{2}·6H_{2}O.

There are also other lower hydrates that can be obtained by heating the "natural" phases:

- 2Mg(OH)_{2}·MgCl_{2}·2H_{2}O (phase 2 dihydrate; ~230 °C)
- 3Mg(OH)_{2}·MgCl_{2}·5H_{2}O (phase 3 pentahydrate; ~110 °C)
- 3Mg(OH)_{2}·MgCl_{2}·4H_{2}O (phase 3 tetrahydrate; ~140 °C)
- 5Mg(OH)_{2}·MgCl_{2}·4H_{2}O (phase 5 tetrahydrate; ~120 °C)
- 5Mg(OH)_{2}·MgCl_{2}·3H_{2}O (phase 5 trihydrate; ~150 °C)
- 9Mg(OH)_{2}·MgCl_{2}·2H_{2}O (phase 9 dihydrate; ~190 °C)

In addition, a heptahydrate of phase 5, 5Mg(OH)_{2}·MgCl_{2}·7H_{2}O, can be obtained by washing the natural octahydrate with ethanol.

All four stable phases have anhydrous versions, such as 3Mg(OH)_{2}·MgCl_{2} (anhydrous phase 3) and 5Mg(OH)_{2}·MgCl_{2} (anhydrous phase 5), with the crystal structure of Mg(OH)_{2}. They can be obtained by heating them to about 230 °C (phases 3 and 5) about 320 °C (phase 2), and about 260 °C (phase 9).

== History ==
These compounds are the primary components of matured magnesia cement, invented in 1867 by the French chemist Stanislas Sorel.

In the late 19th century, several attempts were made to determine the composition of set Sorel's cement, but the results were not conclusive. Phase 3 was properly isolated and described by Robinson and Waggaman in 1909, and phase 5 was identified by Lukens in 1932.

== Properties ==
=== Solubility ===
The oxychlorides are only very slightly soluble in water.

In the system MgO – MgCl_{2} – H_{2}O at about 23 °C, the completely liquid region has vertices at the following triple equilibrium points (as mass fractions, not molar fractions):

S1 = 0.008 MgO + 0.170 MgCl_{2} + 0.822 H_{2}O (Sol:Mg(OH)_{2}:P5)
S2 = 0.010 MgO + 0.222 MgCl_{2} + 0.768 H_{2}O (Sol:P5:P3)
S3 = 0.012 MgO + 0.345 MgCl_{2} + 0.643 H_{2}O (Sol:P3:MgCl_{2}·6H_{2}O)

The other vertices are pure water, magnesium chloride hexahydrate, and the saturated Mg(OH)_{2} solution (0.0044 MgO + 0.9956 H_{2}O by mass).

=== Decomposition and degradation ===
The anhydrous forms decompose when heated above 450-500 °C by decomposition of the hydroxide and chloride anions, releasing water and hydrogen chloride and leaving a magnesium oxide residue, by the reactions:

2 OH^{−} → O^{2−} + H_{2}O
H_{2}O + 2 Cl^{−} → O^{2−} + 2 HCl

Extended exposure of magnesium oxychlorides to water leaches out the soluble MgCl_{2}, leaving hydrated brucite Mg(OH)_{2}.

On exposure to the atmosphere, the oxychlorides will slowly react with carbon dioxide CO_{2} from the air to form magnesium chlorocarbonates. Anhydrous and partially hydrated forms also absorb water, turning into phase 5 and then phase 3 on the way to the chlorocarbonate. The exceptions are the dihydrate and hexahydrate of phase 9, that remain unchanged for many months.

== Structure ==
The crystal structure of phase 3 is triclinic with space group $P\bar 1$ and z = 2. The solid consists polymeric aquohydroxo cations, in the form of double chains of magnesium atoms surrounded and bridged by the oxygen atoms in hydroxy groups and complexed water molecules. These linear cations are interleaved and neutralized by chloride anions and some unbound water molecules, yielding the general formula [(Mg_{2}(OH)_{3}(H_{2}O)_{3})_{n}]^{n+}(Cl^{−})_{n}(H_{2}O)_{n}.

The structure of phase 5 is believed to be similar, with generic formula [(Mg_{3}(OH)_{5}(H_{2}O)_{x})_{n}]^{n+}(Cl^{−})_{n}(H_{2}O)_{n(4−x)}.

The anhydrous forms of phase 3 and phase 5 have the same structure as Mg(OH)_{2}: namely, layers of magnesium cations, each sandwiched between two layers of hydroxy or chloride anions.

Phase 5 crystals form as long needles consisting of rolled-up sheets.

The Raman spectrum of phase 3 has peaks at 3639 and 3657 cm^{−1}, whereas phase 5 has peaks at 3608 and 3691 cm^{−1}, and brucite has a peak at 3650 cm^{−1}. These peaks are attributed to stretching vibrations of the OH groups. Phase 3 has also a peak at 451 cm^{−1}, attributed to the stretching of Mg–O bonds.

== Preparation ==
=== From MgO or Mg(OH)_{2} and MgCl_{2} ===
Phases 3 and 5 can be prepared by mixing powdered magnesium oxide MgO with a solution of magnesium chloride MgCl_{2} in water H_{2}O, in molar ratios 3:1:11 and 5:1:13, respectively, at room temperature. This is the common method of preparing Sorel magnesia cement. Magnesium hydroxide Mg(OH)_{2} can also be used instead of the oxide, with adjusted amount of water.

For best results, the magnesium oxide should have small particle size and large surface area. It can be prepared by calcination of magnesium hydroxycarbonate Mg_{5}(OH)_{2}(CO_{3})_{4}·4H_{2}O at about 600 °C. Higher temperatures increase particle size leading to slower reaction rate.

It is believed that, during the reaction, the magnesium oxide is continuously hydrated and dissolved, helped by the slightly acidic character of the magnesium chloride solution. The acidity is attributed to hydrolysis of the magnesium hexahydrate cations:

[Mg(H_{2}O)_{6}]^{2+} ↔ [Mg(OH)(H_{2}O)_{5}]^{+} + H^{+}

The protons (which are actually hydrated, e.g. as [H_{3}O]^{+}) make the solution acidic; the pH varies from 6.5 to 4.7 as the concentration of MgCl_{2} increases from 30% to 70% (weight basis). The protons then react with and dissolve the nearly insoluble oxide or hydroxide, by such reactions as

MgO + 2 H^{+} + 5 H_{2}O → [Mg(H_{2}O)_{6}]^{2+}
Mg(OH)_{2} + H^{+} + 4 H_{2}O → [Mg(OH)(H_{2}O)_{5}]^{+}

The ions [Mg(H_{2}O)_{6}]^{2+} and [Mg(OH)(H_{2}O)_{5}]^{+} in solution then combine into complex cations with multiple magnesium atoms, bridged by hydroxide anions and water molecules (magnesium aquohydroxo complexes), with general formula [Mg_{x}(OH)_{y}(H_{2}O)_{z}]^{(2x−y)+}. This process involves additional hydrolysis, turning some H_{2}O ligands into OH^{−} and freeing more H^{+}, which keeps dissolving more oxide. With enough magnesium chloride, the dissolution of the oxide is relatively fast, and a clear solution of magnesium aquohydroxo cations can be obtained by filtration.

Over a period of several hours, those cations keep combining into larger complexes, becoming less soluble as they grow. After a few hours (at room temperature), those cations and the chloride anions precipitate as (or turn the solution into) a hydrogel, which then gradually crystallizes into a mixture of phase 3, phase 5, solid magnesium oxide and/or chloride, and/or some residual solution. Depending on the proportion of the reagents, phase 5 may form at first, but then will react with excess chloride to form phase 3.

The magnesium oxide can also react with water to form the hydroxide, which, being poorly soluble, would coat the oxide grains and stop further hydration. The acidity provided by hydrolysis of the cations in solution dissolves this coating, and thus allows the process to run continuously until one of the reagents is exhausted.

=== From MgO or Mg(OH)_{2} and HCl ===
The compounds can also be prepared from magnesium oxide or hydroxide and hydrochloric acid. The MgO – H_{2}O – MgCl_{2} phase diagram is contained in the MgO – H_{2}O – HCl diagram.

=== From MgCl_{2} and NaOH ===
The difficulties of preparing the magnesium oxide and ensuring its full reaction can be avoided by using NaOH instead of MgO or Mg(OH)_{2}, so that all reagents are solutions. However, sodium chloride NaCl may also precipitate for certain concentrations of the reagents.

With this route, stable phase 5 precipitates in a rather narrow range of conditions, namely when the concentration [Cl] of chloride anions in solution is 2.02 ± 0.03 mol/L, the concentration [Mg] of magnesium (as Mg^{2+} and other cations) is 1.78 ± 0.07 mol/L, and the pH is 7.65 ± 0.05. Stable phase 3 precipitates in a broader range of cases, namely when [Cl] is 6.48 ± 2.17 mol/L, [Mg] is 3.14 ± 1.12 mol/L, and the pH is 6.26 ± 0.14

=== Other ===
A short note from 1872 reported the formation a solid with approximate formula 5MgO·MgCl_{2}·13H_{2}O, as a mass of fine needles, from a solution of magnesium ammonium chloride Mg[NH_{4}]Cl_{3} with excess ammonia left standing for several months.

G. André claimed in 1882 the preparation of anhydrous oxychlorides by fusing anhydrous magnesium chloride with powdered magnesium oxide.
