= Friedhelm Eronat =

Geneva-based British centimillionaire business leader (born 1953)

- Born: 1953 (age 72–73); Prien, Germany
- Education: Nicholls State University
- Occupation: Business leader

Friedhelm Eronat is a Geneva-based British centimillionaire business leader mainly involved in oil trading, exploration and production. Eronat is one of the world's most successful oil dealmakers. His estimated wealth is over $100m (£55m), built on deals in places such as Nigeria, Russia and Kazakhstan.

In October 2003, Friedhelm Eronat renounced his United States citizenship and became a British citizen.

== Early life and education ==
The son of Anna and Josef Eronat, Friedhelm Eronat was born in Prien, Germany in 1953. Eronat studied production management and oil engineering at Nicholls State University in Louisiana, graduating in early 1970s.

== Career ==
Eronat, through his offshore company Cliveden Petroleum, purchased the largest single share of oil rights in the Darfur region of Sudan in October 2003.
