= Stanislas Sorel =

French civil engineer, inventor, and chemist

- Born: Stanislas Sorel; 3 February 1803; Putanges-Pont-Ecrepin
- Died: 18 March 1871 (aged 68); Paris
- Citizenship: French
- Education: Civil engineer
- Engineering career
- Discipline: Civil engineering, chemistry
- Significant design: Thermostated oven, hot dipping galvanization, zinc paint, zinc oxychloride, magnesium oxychloride, Sorel cement

Stanislas Sorel (born 1803, Putanges, France; died 18 March 1871, Paris) was a French civil engineer, inventor, and chemist, raised the son of a poor clock-maker.

A poorly known aspect of Sorel’s early works was the development of heating appliances. In 1833 he invented an apparatus able to regulate the combustion, and therefore the temperature, in an oven. It could be considered as a first rudimentary thermostat. He applied this principle to a commercial portable stove (‘Le Cordon Bleu’) to facilitate safe and unattended cooking in the home kitchens. From these very first developments, he was intrigued by the properties of different metals, a.o. these of zinc to protect steel against corrosion.

Sorel filed a patent on 10 May 1837 for a "galvanic" method of protecting iron from rust by either coating it in a bath of molten zinc or by covering it with galvanic paint (cold galvanizing). This was the precursor of the modern hot-dip galvanizing. Sorel patent led to the industrial application and to the widespread use of the hot-dip galvanization process invented nearly one century earlier, in 1742, by the French physician and chemist Paul Jacques Malouin.

In 1857, Sorel patented a new type of paint based on zinc oxychloride and much less toxic than the then currently used lead-based paints containing ceruse, a basic carbonate of lead.

In 1867, Sorel made a new form of cement from a combination of magnesium oxide and magnesium chloride, which had a remarkable capacity to bond with and contain other materials. Sorel cement as it is known has been used for grindstones, tiles, artificial stone and even artificial ivory (e.g. for billiard balls). It is stronger than the more usual Portland cement.

== See also ==
- Friedel's salt
- Salt-concrete
- Sorel cement
- Magnesium oxychloride
