= Cement industry in China =

Industry in China

China is the largest cement producer in the world. As of 2004, it was responsible for 60% of cement global production. In 2017, China produced 2,400,000 metric tons of cement, whereas other countries produced about 1,728,300 metric tons.

Cement production adds one ton of carbon dioxide (CO_{2}) per ton of cement. According to engineering company FLSmidth, in order to heat a cement kiln with waste, about three times more waste is needed than the amount of coal used, reducing emissions by only about 10%. However, the Chinese cement industry has improved energy efficiency. In 2017, it accounted for 57% of the global industry's output, but only 52% of its emissions. However, the emission reductions from energy efficiency measures are vague compared to those that could be achieved with innovative technologies such as carbon capture and storage (CCS), which sequesters emissions.

== See also ==
- China Resources Cement
- Economy of China
