= Freda Simmonds =

New Zealand painter (1912–1983)

- Born: Alfreda Simmonds; 1912; Auckland, New Zealand
- Died: 1983 (aged 70–71)
- Known for: Painting
- Notable work: Rimu, Northern Landscape, and Northland Harbour: Houhora Black Swan.
- Movement: Abstract

Alfreda "Freda" Simmonds (1912–1983) was a painter from New Zealand.

== Career ==
Simmonds studied at the University of Auckland. At the end of World War II, Simmonds moved to Kaitaia, in the north of New Zealand, and developed an interest in painting. Over several years she developed her artistic techniques at Adult Education Summer Schools in Auckland, New Zealand.

Many of Simmonds's works are landscapes and her painting style is abstract, often using "curvi-linear forms" and gradations of colour. Notable works include Rimu (1958), Northern Landscape, Northland Harbour: Houhora Black Swan, and Torea – Pied Oyster Catcher sold at International Art Centre, 'The John Leech Collection'.

Her work is included in several art collections including the Victoria University of Wellington Art Collection.

=== Exhibitions ===
Simmons exhibited with Auckland Society of the Arts including the 1959 exhibition, Eight New Zealand Painters and was included alongside Jean Horsley and M. Rainier in the 1957 exhibition Three Women Painters.

She was active in The Group, an informal art association from Christchurch, New Zealand, formed to provide a freer alternative to the Canterbury Society of Arts. She contributed works to multiple exhibitions by The Group including in: 1957; 1963; 1964; 1965; 1966 (as Alfreda Simmonds); 1967; 1968; 1969; 1970; 1971; 1973; 1974; and 1977.
