= Friedl =

Friedl is a Southern German diminutive variation of the name Fried - or alternately, a diminutive of the feminine given names Elfriede and Frederika. Notable people with the name include:

== Given name ==
- Friedl Behn-Grund (1906–1989), German cinematographer
- Friedel Buckow (1897–1979), German film editor
- Friedl Czepa (1898–1973), Austrian actress
- Friedl Däuber (1911–1997), German alpine and cross-country skier
- Friedl Dicker-Brandeis (1898–1944), Austrian artist and educator
- Friedl Haerlin (1901–1981), German actress
- Friedl Hardt (1919–1991), German actress
- Friedl Iby (1905–1960), German gymnast
- Friedl Kjellberg (1905–1993), Austrian-born Finnish ceramist
- Friedl Kubelka (born 1946), British-Austrian photographer, filmmaker and visual artist
- Friedl Murauer (born 1938), Austrian hurdler
- Friedl Rinder (1905–2001), German chess master

== Surname ==
- Claudia Friedl (born 1960), Swiss politician
- Franz R. Friedl (1892–1977), Austrian composer
- René Friedl (born 1967), East German-German luger
- Sigmund Friedl (1851–1914), Austrian philatelist, stamp dealer and forger
- T. J. Friedl (born 1995), American baseball player
- Marco Friedl (born 1998), Austrian footballer
- Thomas Peter Friedl (born 1967), German film producer

== See also ==
- Friedel
