= Elfriede Tungl =

Austrian civil engineer (1922–1981)

- fair use only
- Born: 4 July 1922; Vienna
- Died: 25 August 1981 (aged 59); Vienna
- Education: TU Wien
- Occupations: Civil engineer, academic

Elfriede Tungl (4 July 1922 – 25 August 1981) was an Austrian civil engineer. She was the first Austrian woman to earn a doctorate in civil engineering and in 1973 became the first female associate professor at the Vienna University of Technology.

== Early life and education ==
Elfriede Tungl was born on 4 July 1922 in Vienna.

Tungl enrolled in mathematics, physics and chemistry at the University of Vienna in 1940, but changed subjects after one year and studied civil engineering, graduating from the TU Wien in 1948. She received her doctorate from the TU Wien (Vienna University of Technology) in 1950. Tungl started work in the bridge construction department of the General Directorate of the Austrian Federal Railways, the ÖBB.

In 1952, she became a university research assistant working on issues related to the theory of structural systems. In 1963, her habilitation (post doctorate degree) at the Vienna University of Technology looked at the fields of elasticity and material strength theory. Tungl was the second woman to habilitate at this university, and the first woman to habilitate in these fields. She is thought to have been the first female civil engineer in Europe to hold a doctorate.

== Career ==
Tungl taught as a visiting professor in the US from 1965 to 1968, and in 1973 she became the first woman to be appointed associate professor at the Vienna University of Technology. She became head of the department of experimental Spannungs- und Dehnungsmessung, (stress and strain measurement) until she retired for health reasons in 1975.

Tungl died in Vienna on 25 August 1981.
