= Elfi Graf =

Austrian Schlagersinger (born 1952)

Elfi Graf (born Elfriede Sepp; 20 November 1952 in Dornbirn, Vorarlberg) is an Austrian Schlagersinger.

== Biography ==
Graf was born in Dornbirn and grew up there with her two siblings. She studied classical music, but did not complete the course. In 1971, she won the talent competition Show Chance and then the schlager singer Gus Backus discovered her in Talentschuppen.

After working as a telephonist, Graf had her first hit in 1974 with Herzen haben keine Fenster, which was rewritten in English as My Melody of Love, which was a hit for Bobby Vinton, and as Don't stay away too long, which was a hit for Peters and Lee. Its Russian version "Люди, улыбнитесь миру" (lyrics by Igor Reznik) has been sung by Edita Piekha since 1983.Herzen haben keine Fenster was chosen by Jan Feddersen in 2008 as number three in a list of 'feelings charts'. Later in 1974, Graf won the Goldene Europa and the silver Bravo-Otto.

Graf had further hits with the songs Am schönsten ist es zu Hause (1976) and Mozartgasse 10 (1977). Her daughter Heidi was born in 1982.

In 1990, Graf competed in the German preliminary round of Grand Prix der Volksmusik with the song Einen Adam, einen Apfel und ein kleines Paradies, and in 1995, she competed in the Austrian round with the song Lieber Leierkastenmann.

Graf lives in Götzis, Vorarlberg and continues to appear in schlager festivals.

== Songs ==
- Herzen haben keine Fenster 1973
- Wer auf die Liebe warten kann 1974
- Orphelias Traum 1974
- Er ist ein Schatz 1975
- Tango in der Bar von Fernando 1975
- Am schönsten ist es zu Hause 1976
- Mozartgasse 10 1977
- Die Stunde der Wahrheit 1977
- Sommerwind 1977
- Hoffnungslos verliebt in dich (Hopelessly devoted to you) 1978
- Sunday Girl 1979
- Einen Adam, einen Apfel und ein kleines Paradies 1990
- Rote Rosen lügen nicht 1992

== Discography ==
CDs (incomplete):

- Herzen haben keine Fenster
- Jedes Herz braucht doch nur eine Heimat 1994
- Wenn mei Herz a Fensterl hätt' 1994
- Versprich mir keinen Regenbogen 1994
- Eine Hand voll kleiner Träume 1996
- Aber Dich vergess ich nie 2001
- Lieder und Geschichten zur Weihnachtszeit
- Ich hör dir zu 2006
