= Charles Friedel =

French chemist and mineralogist (1832–1899)

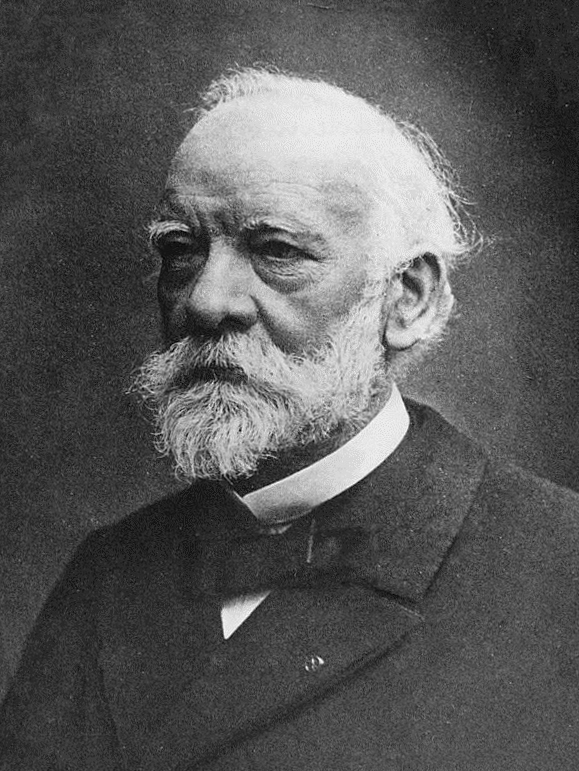
- Friedel in 1890s
- Born: 12 March 1832; Strasbourg, France
- Died: 20 April 1899 (aged 67); Montauban, France
- Education: University of Strasbourg; Sorbonne
- Known for: Friedel–Crafts reaction Ketonic decarboxylation Organosilicon compound
- Awards: Davy Medal (1880)
- Scientific career
- Fields: Mineralogy; Chemistry
- Workplaces: Sorbonne
- Theses: Recherches sur les acétones et sur les aldéhydes. Suivi de Sur la pyro-électricité dans les cristaux bons conducteurs de l'électricité (1869); Sur la pyro-électricité dans les cristaux bons conducteurs de l'électricité (1869)
- Doctoral advisor: Charles Adolphe Wurtz
- Doctoral students: Henri Becquerel; Georges Urbain; André-Louis Debierne

Charles Friedel (French: [ʃaʁl fʁidɛl]; 12 March 1832 – 20 April 1899) was a French chemist and mineralogist.

== Life ==
A native of Strasbourg, France, Friedel was a student of Louis Pasteur at the Sorbonne. In 1876, he became a professor of chemistry and mineralogy at the Sorbonne. While there he was elected as an honorary member of the Manchester Literary and Philosophical Society in 1892.

Friedel developed the Friedel-Crafts alkylation and acylation reactions with James Crafts in 1877, and attempted to make synthetic diamonds.

Friedel's wife's father was the engineer, Charles Combes. The Friedel family is a rich lineage of French scientists:

- Georges Friedel (1865–1933), French crystallographer and mineralogist; son of Charles
- Edmond Friedel (1895–1972), French mining engineer, founder of BRGM, the French geological survey; son of Georges
- Jacques Friedel (1921–2014), French physicist; son of Edmond
