= Friedel's law =

Friedel's law, named after Georges Friedel, is a property of Fourier transforms of real functions.

Given a real function $f(x)$, its Fourier transform

$$F(k)=\int^{+\infty}_{-\infty}f(x)e^{i k \cdot x }dx$$

has the following properties.

- $F(k)=F^*(-k) \,$

where $F^*$ is the complex conjugate of $F$.

Centrosymmetric points $(k,-k)$ are called Friedel's pairs.

The squared amplitude ($|F|^2$) is centrosymmetric:

- $|F(k)|^2=|F(-k)|^2 \,$

The phase $\phi$ of $F$ is antisymmetric:

- $\phi(k) = -\phi(-k) \,$.

Friedel's law is used in X-ray diffraction, crystallography and scattering from real potentials within the Born approximation. Note that a twin operation (a.k.a. Opération de maclage) is equivalent to an inversion centre and the intensities from the individual reflections are equal under Friedel's law.
