= Georges Friedel =

French mineralogist (1865–1933)

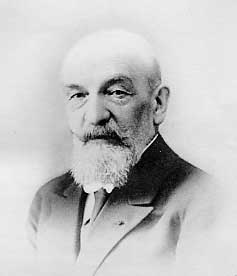
- Georges Friedel
- Born: 19 July 1865; Mulhouse, France
- Died: 11 December 1933 (aged 68); Strasbourg, France
- Education: École Polytechnique; École Nationale des Mines
- Known for: Friedel's law Friedel's salt mesophase labels
- Father: Charles Friedel
- Scientific career
- Fields: mineralogist crystallographer
- Workplaces: École Nationale des Mines; University of Strasbourg
- Doctoral advisor: François Ernest Mallard

Georges Friedel (19 July 1865 – 11 December 1933) was a French mineralogist and crystallographer.

== Life ==
Georges was the son of the chemist Charles Friedel. Georges' grandfather was Louis Georges Duvernoy who held the chair in comparative anatomy from 1850 to 1855 at the Muséum national d'histoire naturelle.

Georges studied at the École Polytechnique in Paris and the École Nationale des Mines in St. Etienne, and was a student of François Ernest Mallard. In 1893 he obtained a professorship at the École Nationale des Mines, of which he would later become the director. After the First World War, he returned as a professor to the University of Strasbourg in Alsace. Due to ill health, he took early retirement in 1930, and died in 1933. He was married with five children.

== Scientific works ==
Like his teacher Mallard, Friedel concerned himself with the theories of Auguste Bravais, the founder of crystallography. Friedel was able to demonstrate the theoretical ideas of Bravais (the Bravais lattice) with the help of X-ray diffraction experiments on crystals, and so provide the physical basis for these ideas. One of his most important discoveries was the law that now bears his name.

== Friedel's salt ==
In 1897, Georges Friedel synthesised and identified calcium chloroaluminate which received his name. Georges Friedel also synthesised calcium aluminate in 1903 in the framework of his work on the macles theory.

== Mesomorphic states of matter ==
The presumption that solid and liquid are adjacent states of matter was underscored by Friedrich Reinitzer in 1888 when he noted a cloudy mesophase of cholesteryl benzoate between 145.5 °C and 178.5 °C. The subject was taken up in Germany, and in 1907 also in France by Georges Friedel and François Grandjean, as they described the "focal conic liquid".

Friedel contributed his Mesomorphic States of Matter to the Annales des Physiques in 1922. This two-hundred-page work established much of the current terminology in mesophase physics. First, the nematic phase he characterized as having microscopic threads (these threads are today interpreted as disclinations in the director-field in the mesophase). Second, Friedel coined the term smectic phase for a layered mesophase having the structure of neat soap. Third, Friedel use the term cholesteric phase for materials like cholesteryl benzoate, and noted that such mesophases "involve strong twists around a direction normal to the positive optical axis".

Scientists have followed Friedel's classification and the term mesophase for the intermediate states has also been adopted from him. He was of the conviction that the term liquid crystal did not bear scrutiny. Indeed,

The liquid crystals were not crystals at all, but peculiar liquids with some hint of solid properties.

In 1931, Georges published, with his son Edmond Friedel, the results of their X-ray crystallography studies: "The physical properties of the mesophases in general, and their importance in a scheme of classification."

== Important publications ==
- 1904: Groupements cristallins
- 1907: Etudes sur les lois de Bravais
- 1922: Les états mésomorphes de la matiere

== See also ==
- The Friedel family is a rich lineage of French scientists:
  - Charles Friedel (1832–1899), French chemist known for the Friedel–Crafts reaction
  - Georges Friedel (1865–1933), here above described, French crystallographer and mineralogist; son of Charles
  - Edmond Friedel (1895–1972), French applied scientist and mining engineer, founder of BRGM, the French geological survey; son of Georges
  - Jacques Friedel, (1921–2014), French physicist; son of Edmond, see the French site for Jacques Friedel
