= Friede (name) =

Friede is both a given name and surname. Notable people with the name include:

Given name:

- Friede Springer (born 1942), German publisher

Surname:

- Eleanor Friede (died 2008), American book editor
- Juan Friede (1901–1990), Soviet-Colombian historian
- Mike Friede (born 1957), American football player
- Oscar Friede (1882–1943), American tug of war athlete
- Sidney Friede (born 1998), German soccer player
- Tim Friede (born c. 1968), American snake enthusiast
