= Jacques Friedel =

French physicist (1921–2014)

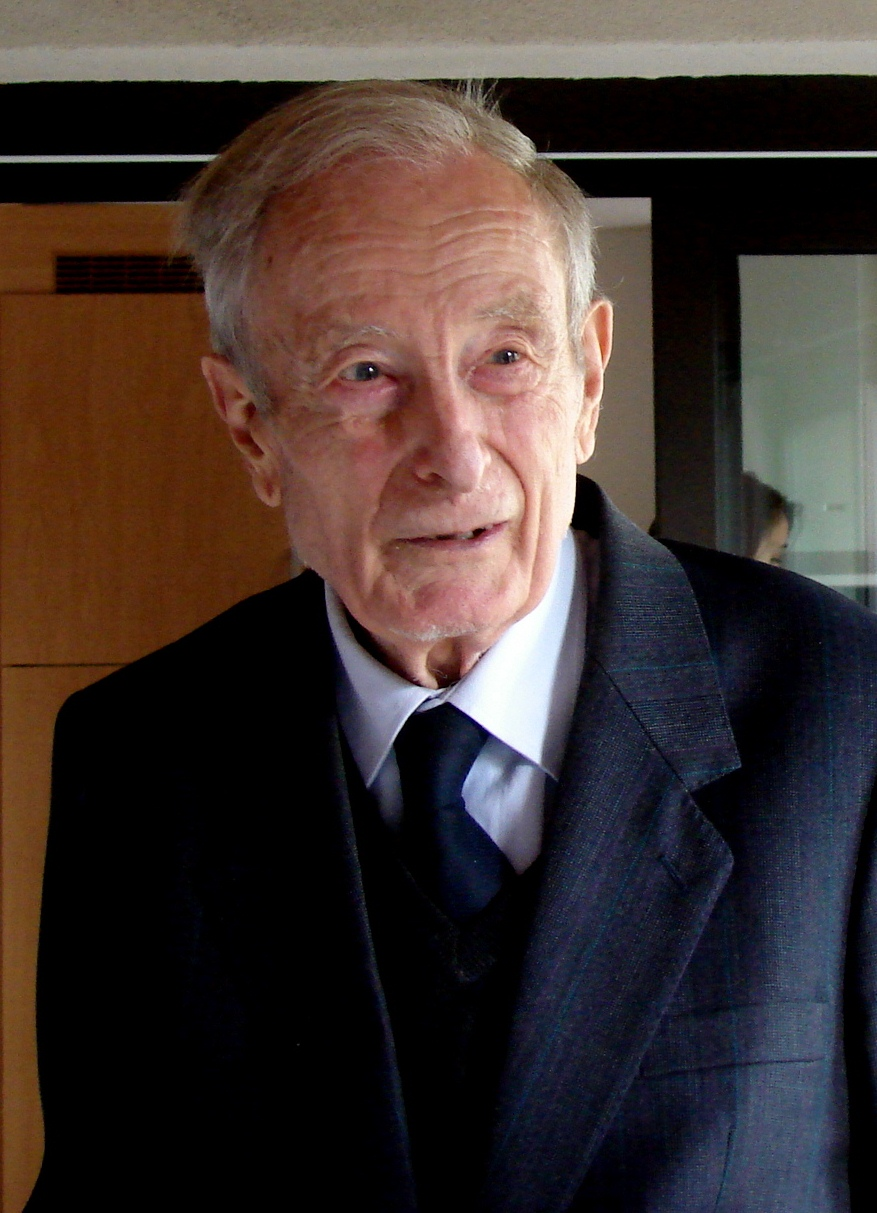
- Friedel in June 2011
- Born: 11 February 1921
- Died: 27 August 2014 (aged 93)
- Education: Mines ParisTech; École Polytechnique; University of Paris; University of Bristol (PhD)
- Known for: Theory of transition metals Theory of dislocations Friedel oscillations Friedel sum rule
- Awards: Legion of Honour (1989); FRS (1988); Three Physicists Prize (1987); Dannie Heineman Prize (1981); CNRS Gold medal (1970); Holweck Prize (1964)
- Scientific career
- Fields: Condensed matter physics
- Doctoral advisor: Nevill Francis Mott

Jacques Friedel ForMemRS (French: [fʁidɛl]; 11 February 1921 – 27 August 2014) was a French physicist and material scientist.

== Education ==
Friedel attended the Cours Hattemer, a private school. He studied at the École Polytechnique from 1944 to 1946, and the École nationale supérieure des mines de Paris from 1946 to 1948. He graduated from the University of Paris with a licence ès sciences degree in 1948, then studied at the Metallurgy Laboratory of the School of Mines with Charles Crussard. He graduated from the University of Bristol with a PhD in 1952, where he studied with Nevill Francis Mott, and a Doctorat d'Etat in Paris in 1954.

== Career ==
He was assistant professor at Paris-Sorbonne University in 1956, then full professor of Solid State Physics (from 1959 to 1989) at the University of Paris-Sud where he co-founded the Laboratory of Solid State Physics. He authored more than 200 journal articles.

He was the president of the Société française de physique, the European Physical Society, and the French Academy of Sciences from 1992 to 1994.

== Awards and honors ==
Friedel was awarded the gold medal of the French CNRS in 1970, elected as a foreign member of the National Academy of Sciences, the Royal Swedish Academy of Sciences and a Foreign Member of the Royal Society (ForMemRS) in 1988. He was a fellow of American Physical Society and fellow of European Physical Society. He received in 1964 the Holweck Prize and in 1988 the Von Hippel Award. He was appointed a Knight of the Légion d'Honneur, promoted to Officer and subsequently to Commander on 31 March 1989 and to Grand Officer on 30 December 1995. He was promoted to Grand Cross on 14 July 2013.

== Personal life ==
Friedel's great-grandfather Charles Friedel was an organic chemist and crystallographer at Paris-Sorbonne University, his grandfather Georges Friedel worked on liquid crystals, and his father Edmond Friedel Edmond Friedel was the director of the National School of Mines from 1937 to 1965.

== See also ==
- Slater–Pauling rule
