= Gabow =

Gabow is a surname. Notable people with the surname include:

- Adde Gabow (fl. 2007), Somali politician
- Harold N. Gabow (fl. 1968), American computer scientist
- Patricia A. Gabow (born 1944), American physician
