= Remediation of contaminated sites with cement =

Method of environmental remediation

Remediation of contaminated sites with cement, also called solidification/stabilization with cement (S/S with cement) is a common method for the safe environmental remediation of contaminated land with cement. The cement solidifies the contaminated soil and prevents pollutants from moving, such as rain causing leaching of pollutants into the groundwater or being carried into streams by rain or snowmelt. Developed in the 1950s, the technology is widely used today to treat industrial hazardous waste and contaminated material at brownfield sites i.e. abandoned or underutilized properties that are not being redeveloped because of fears that they may be contaminated with hazardous waste. S/S provides an economically viable means of treating contaminated sites. This technology treats and contains contaminated soil on site thereby reducing the need for landfills.

== Process ==
The Solidification/Stabilization method utilizes chemically reactive formulations that form stable solids that are non-hazardous or less-hazardous than the original materials. Solidification refers to the physical changes in the contaminated material when a certain binding agent is added. These changes include an increase in compressive strength, a decrease in permeability, and condensing of hazardous materials. Stabilization refers to the chemical changes between the stabilizing agent (binding agent) and the hazardous constituent. These changes should include a less soluble, less toxic constituent with hindered mobility. Common bonding agents include, but are not limited to, portland cement, lime, limestone, fly ash, slag, clay, and gypsum. Because of the vast types of hazardous materials, each agent should be tested on the site before a full-scale project is put under way. Most binding agents used are a blend of various single binding agents, depending on the hazardous material it will be used on. Portland cement has been used to treat more contaminated material than any other S/S binding agent because of its ability to bind free liquids, reduce permeability, encapsulate hazardous materials, and reduce the toxicity of certain contaminants. Lime can be used to adjust the pH of the substance of drive off water by using high heats of hydration. Limestone can also be used to adjust pH levels. Slag is often used for economical purposes because of its low cost.

== Different methods ==
=== In situ ===
In situ is a Latin phrase meaning “in the place”. When referred to chemistry or chemical reactions it means “in the reaction mixture”. In situ S/S, accounting for 20% of S/S projects from 1982–2005, is used to mix binding agents into the contaminated material while remaining on the site. Outside benefits of in situ mixing include conserving transportation costs, no landfill usage, and lesser risk to surrounding communities to be exposed to the hazardous materials while in transport. In-situ mixing treatments can also have the added benefit of improving soil conditions on the site.

=== Ex situ ===
Ex situ is a Latin phrase meaning “off site”. In ex situ mixing, the hazardous materials are excavated, then machine-mixed with a certain bonding agent. This new, less-hazardous material is then deposited in a designated area, or reused on the initial site. From 1982–2005, ex-situ S/S technologies have accounted for 80% of the 217 projects that were completed.

== Limitations and concerns ==
Prolonged use of the treated site and environmental and weather conditions may cause the materials used to stabilize the contaminants to erode, limiting the effect of the stabilization on the hazardous materials. Because of this, continuous monitoring of the site is required in order to ensure the contaminants have not re-assembled. Environmental factors such as freezing–thawing and wetting–drying were the focus of many studies dealing with the strength of S/S. It was found that freezing and thawing had the most adverse effects on the durability of the treated materials.

When dealing with a radioactive contaminant, the solidification process may be interfered by various other types of hazardous waste. Most S/S processes have little or limited effects on organics and pesticides. Only by destroying these wastes by heating at very high temperatures will organics and pesticides be immobilized. Prior to performing the process to these types of sites, treatability studies need to be conducted in order to conclude if the solidification/stabilization process will be beneficial. These cement processes can result in major volume changes to the site, often up to double its original volume.

== Projects ==
=== Sydney Tar Ponds ===
The governments of Canada and the province of Nova Scotia agreed in January 2007 to clean up the infamous Sydney Tar Ponds contaminated site using S/S technology. Cement was mixed into the contaminated waste to solidify and stabilize it. When the S/S process was complete, the solidified areas were covered with an engineered cap consisting of a clay, followed by layers of gravel and soil. Finally, the surface was planted with grass and other vegetation.

=== Former wood treating facility in Port Newark, New Jersey ===
S/S technologies were used to treat a contaminated former wood treating facility in Port Newark, New Jersey. Approximately 8 acres (32,000 m^{2}) of soil was contaminated by wood with arsenic, chromium, and polycyclic aromatic hydrocarbons. 8% of Portland cement was used by wet weight of contaminated soil. Both in situ and ex situ processes were utilized to treat over 35,000 cubic meters of contaminated soil. The ex situ treated soil was mixed with Portland cement by a pugmill then placed on top of the in situ treated soil. This created an excellent base for pavement to be placed over the site. The proposed use for the treated site is a shipping container storage area.

=== Former electric generating station in Boston, Massachusetts ===
Abandoned warehouses in Boston, Massachusetts are being renovated or torn down in order to build new structures. On this site is the former Central Power System, built in 1890. When built, this power station was considered to be the biggest electric generating plant in the world. This building has been abandoned since the 1950s and has not produced electricity in over 90 years. In the early 90s, renovations were started but were quickly shut down when free-floating oil was discovered in the sewers. Cleanup efforts were unsuccessful as they brought more oil onto the site. In 1999, cement-based S/S treatments were utilized to treat 2,100 cubic meters of contaminated materials. Lead and Petroleum contaminated soils were managed and treated successfully at this site.

=== Dockside Green in Victoria British Columbia ===
A 1,300,000-square-foot (120,000 m^{2}) complex of mixed residential, office, retail and commercial space is being built on 15 acres (61,000 m^{2}) of former industrial land in downtown Victoria that was contaminated by lead. 10 tonnes of soil was treated with cement, which was mixed into the soil on site simply by using an excavator bucket. The soil was thus rendered completely safe as was shown by tests on soil samples.

=== Former battery breaking site in Brandon, Manitoba ===
A 10,000 square metre lot formerly occupied by the Brandon Scrap Metal and Iron Company was chosen by the City of Brandon for the site for its new fire and police headquarters. For many years, lead cell batteries were destroyed there and the lead was extracted, leaving the untreated cases on site. An environmental assessment showed that the site was contaminated due to the presence of heavy metals, lead and hydrocarbon pollution. Cement based S/S was employed to successfully remediate 600 tonnes of contaminated soil.

=== Skeet shooting range near St. Catharines, Ontario ===
A vacant 5-hectare property near the Welland Canal in St. Catharines had surface soil containing dangerous concentrations of lead and polycyclic aromatic hydrocarbons (PAHs) to a depth up to 0.4 m due to the past operations of an adjacent skeet shooting range. About 26,000 tonnes of soil were treated using S/S to bring the contamination levels below the Ontario Land Disposal Regulations criteria.

== See also ==
- Hazardous Waste
- Pondcrete
- Salt-concrete
- Saltcrete
- Soil vapor extraction
- Soil contamination
- Water pollution
- Environmental remediation
- Radioactive waste
