= Rocky Flats National Wildlife Refuge =

Nature reserve in Colorado, United States

- IUCN category IV (habitat/species management area)
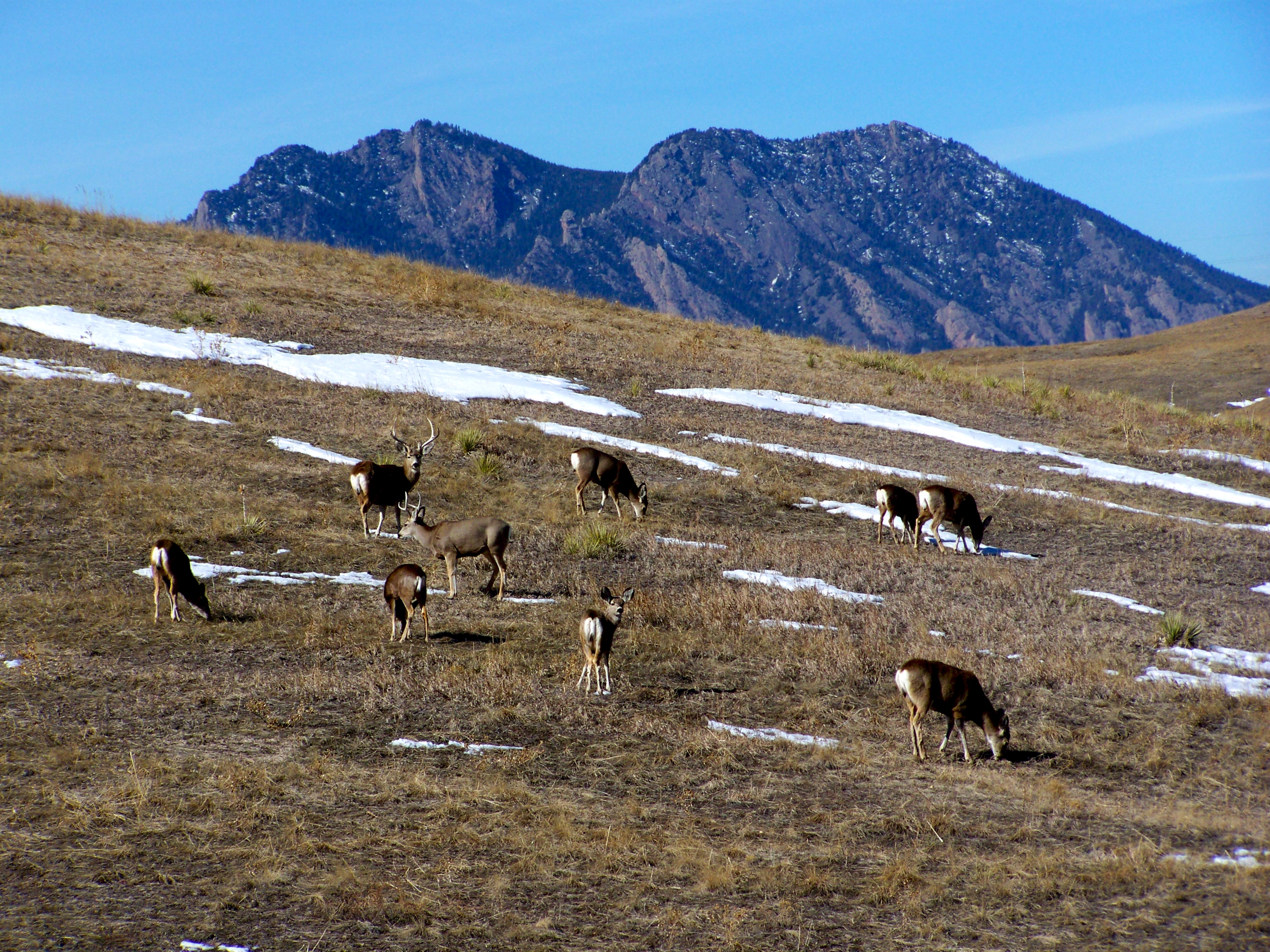

- Location within the United States
- Location: Jefferson County, Colorado, United States
- Nearest city: Arvada
- Coordinates: 39°53′24″N 105°13′13″W
- Area: 5,237 acres (2,119 ha)
- Established: 2007
- Governing body: U.S. Fish and Wildlife Service
- Website: Rocky Flats National Wildlife Refuge

The Rocky Flats National Wildlife Refuge is a 5,237-acre (21.19 km^{2}) National Wildlife Refuge in the United States, located approximately 16 miles (26 km) northwest of Denver, Colorado. The refuge is situated west of the cities of Broomfield and Westminster and north of the city of Arvada. The refuge is home to various animals, including a herd of 150 elk, occasional black bear, mountain lions, and moose; as well as badgers, bats, coyote, two species of owl, mule deer, northern flicker, white pelican, black-tailed prairie dog, and porcupine. The site also contains an estimated 630 plant species. Prior to its establishment in 2007, the area housed a large manufacturing complex that produced nuclear weapons parts from the 1950s through the 1990s, until shutting down in 1992.

== History ==
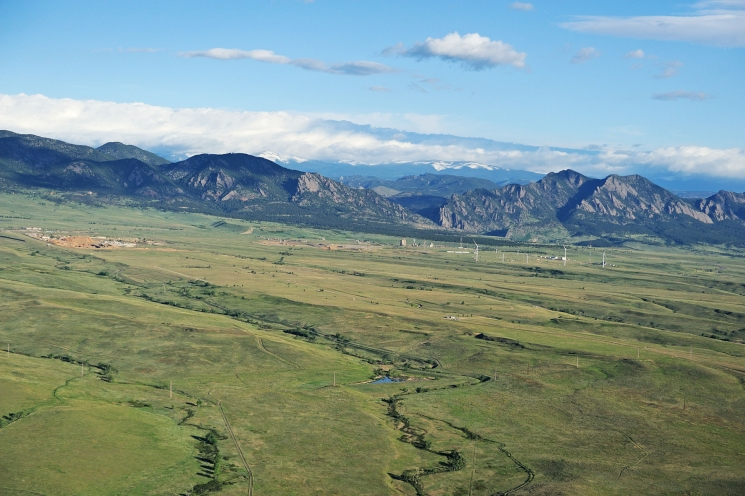
Rocky Flats National Wildlife Refuge covers over 5,000 acres, including these open plains.

The Rocky Flats National Wildlife Refuge is one of over 560 refuges in the National Wildlife Refuge System – a network of lands set aside and managed by the U.S. Fish and Wildlife Service specifically for wildlife. The Refuge is located along the Front Range of Colorado at the intersection of Jefferson, Boulder, and Broomfield counties. The U.S. Fish and Wildlife Service manages the Refuge.

Native Americans occupied the land intermittently prior to the 1800s and limited artifacts have been located from this era. Starting in 1868, the Scott family established a homestead here and the land was used to raise cattle. Later, the Lindsay family raised cattle and built a house and barn in the 1940s.

In 1951, the U.S. Atomic Energy Commission acquired 2,519 acres, which included the Lindsay property, for the Rocky Flats Plant to produce nuclear and nonnuclear weapons including plutonium fission primaries for nuclear weapons. An additional 4,027 acres were acquired in 1974 for plant expansion. This 6,500-acre Rocky Flats Site was one of 13 nuclear weapons production facilities in the United States during the Cold War and was managed by the U.S. Department of Energy (DOE). The plant operated from 1952 to 1994 with manufacturing activities taking place in the center portion of the site with a large buffer zone around the area.

Nuclear production work stopped briefly to address environmental and safety concerns, and was resumed in 1990. In 1992, the Rocky Flats mission was terminated when President George H. W. Bush canceled the W-88 Trident Warhead program. Nuclear and nonnuclear production stopped in 1993, and in 1994 the last shipment of defense-related materials was sent off-site.

The plant was subject to a $7 billion Superfund investigation and environmental cleanup effort. The site was added to the U.S. Environmental Protection Agency's (EPA) National Priorities List (Superfund List) in 1989. It was renamed the Rocky Flats Environmental Technology Site as of 1994. Through the Rocky Flats National Wildlife Refuge Act of 2001, the site was established as a national wildlife refuge while cleanup of the site was underway. With oversight from the EPA and Colorado Department of Public Health and the Environment (CDPHE), the DOE completed the $7 billion cleanup in 2005. The DOE still maintains 1,300 acres as part of their legacy management for long-term care and maintenance, and to ensure the cleanup is functioning as designed. These lands are not part of the Refuge.

The Rocky Flats National Wildlife Refuge consists of lands that were the former Rocky Flats Plant security buffer zone. The Superfund investigation and cleanup effort found that Refuge lands (then-called the Peripheral Operable Unit) would be suitable for unlimited use and unrestricted exposure - that is, any use. Under the Rocky Flats National Wildlife Refuge Act of 2001 (Pub. L. 107–107 (text) (PDF), 115 Stat. 1379, enacted December 28, 2001), most of the 6,240-acre (25.3 km^{2}) Rocky Flats site became a refuge, provided that certification from the EPA is obtained and which asserts that the cleanup and closure have been completed. The refuge does not include the 600 acres that contain the former weapons site and monitoring areas. These remain under the jurisdiction of the DOE and will not be opened to the public.

While some greet the new park with enthusiasm, others question assessments of its safety. Federal lawsuits have been filed against the United States Fish and Wildlife Service and others in an attempt to block opening of the park. The U.S. Fish and Wildlife Service opened the refuge's trails on September 15, 2018.

== Status ==
The Comprehensive Conservation Plan (CCP) emphasizes wildlife and habitat conservation, and a moderate level of wildlife-dependent public use.

On April 17, 2015, the U.S. Court of Appeals terminated objections against a 2011 land exchange affecting the refuge. This exchange added over 600 acres of land to refuge and acquired over 1,200 acres of subsurface mineral rights beneath the refuge in exchange for a 300-foot transportation corridor along the refuge's eastern boundary.

In September 2015, the wildlife refuge opened for two guided hikes. It officially opened to the public Sep. 15, 2018.

== Controversy ==
During a $7 billion Superfund cleanup, millions of environmental data points (soil, air, surface water, ground water, sediment) were collected from thousands of sampling locations. The results of this environmental investigation are presented in a CERCLA report. Because the environmental investigation found levels of contamination in the Peripheral Operable Unit (now Refuge lands) were below levels of regulatory concern, the Refuge did not require remedial action. In May 2007, the POU was deleted from the Superfund National Priorities List. The lands comprising the POU were transferred to the U.S. Fish and Wildlife Service for establishment as the Rocky Flats National Wildlife Refuge, pursuant to an Act of Congress.

Despite the investigation and cleanup efforts, some question the adequacy of cleanup efforts and agency studies. In 2017, local activists sued the U.S. Fish and Wildlife Service. On September 29, 2017, the U.S. District Court dismissed this lawsuit. The Court explained the activist groups "merely rehashed old arguments", and did not provide new evidence or legal authority as support for the lawsuit. The Court awarded costs to U.S. Fish and Wildlife Service.

In 2018, several Colorado school districts voted to ban students from attending school-sanctioned trips to the former Rocky Flats plant, citing concerns about the area's previous designation as a Superfund site. In mid-November, after the elections, Democratic majority leaders of both the State House and Senate (both representing nearby Boulder) joined the renewed call to close the refuge to the public.
