= Sydney Tar Ponds =

Hazardous waste site in Nova Scotia, Canada

Coordinates: 46.15°N 60.19°W

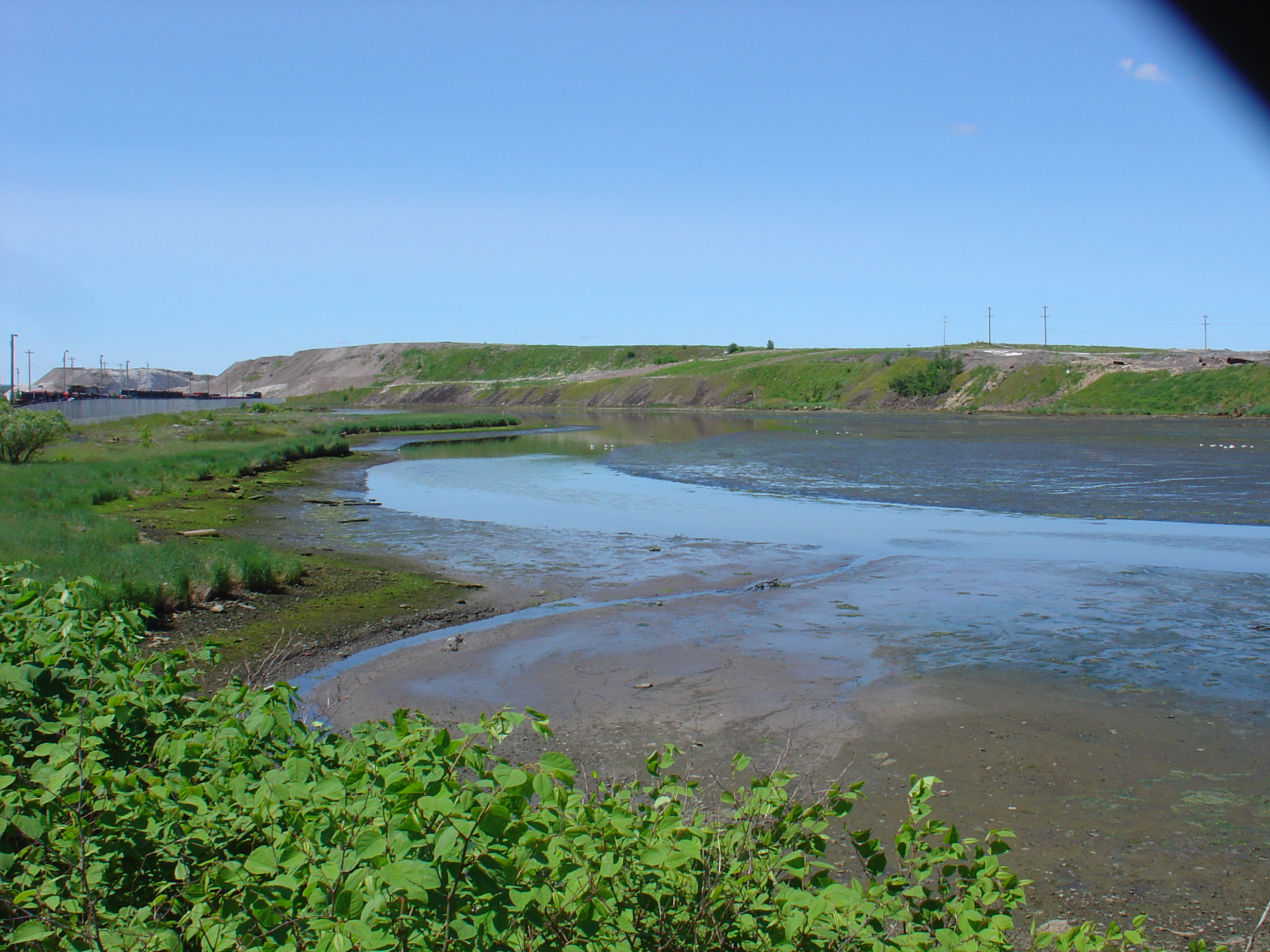
North Pond, Sydney Tar Ponds, July 2005.

The Sydney Tar Ponds were a hazardous waste site on Cape Breton Island in Nova Scotia, Canada.

Located on the eastern shore of Sydney Harbour in the former city of Sydney (now amalgamated into the Cape Breton Regional Municipality), the Tar Ponds formed in a tidal estuary at the mouth of Muggah Creek, a freshwater stream that empties into the harbour. Throughout the 20th century, runoff from coke ovens associated with Sydney Steel Corporation's (SYSCO) now-decommissioned steel mill filled the estuary with the typical variety of coal-based contaminants and sludge. Efforts to clean up the waterway were dogged by false starts, delays, and political controversy. The coke ovens closed down but 12 years later, the toxic mess remained. After extensive public consultation and technical studies, a C$400 million cleanup plan, jointly funded by the Government of Canada and Government of Nova Scotia, was announced in January 2007. The cleanup was completed in 2013 with the opening of Open Hearth Park which is situated on the site of the former steel plant.

== Geography ==
The North Pond and the South Pond extended over a combined area of 34 hectares (84 acres), and contained 500,000 metric tonnes of contaminated sediments. The nearby coke ovens site spanned 68 hectares (168 acres) on a sloping field overlooking the estuary. It contained an estimated 560,000 tonnes of contaminated soil.

A small stream, the Coke Ovens Brook Connector, connected the coke ovens with the Tar Ponds. It served as the main pathway for contaminants migrating from the coke ovens to the Tar Ponds. To the east of the coke ovens, and uphill from them, an abandoned municipal dump served as an additional source of contaminated groundwater, or leachate.

The polluted sites lay in the middle of the former city of Sydney (estimated population 25,000), now part of the Cape Breton Regional Municipality (CBRM) (2001 population 105,968).

Almost all contaminants resulted from coke production, one of the most common industrial processes of the 19th and 20th centuries. While almost all of the contaminants derived from coal, the Tar Ponds include two pockets containing an estimated total of 3.8 metric tonnes of polychlorinated biphenyls (PCBs). PCBs are known to cause cancer, and Sydney area residents experienced a local cancer rate 45% higher than the Nova Scotia average, and "by far the highest rate in Canada." Government officials "refused to acknowledge that environmental causes may play a significant role" and instead suggested "lifestyle factors" including heavy smoking, poor diet and genetic causes were responsible. Research revealed that steel workers in Sydney were inhaling what could equal smoking 30 plus packs of cigarettes a day.

== History ==
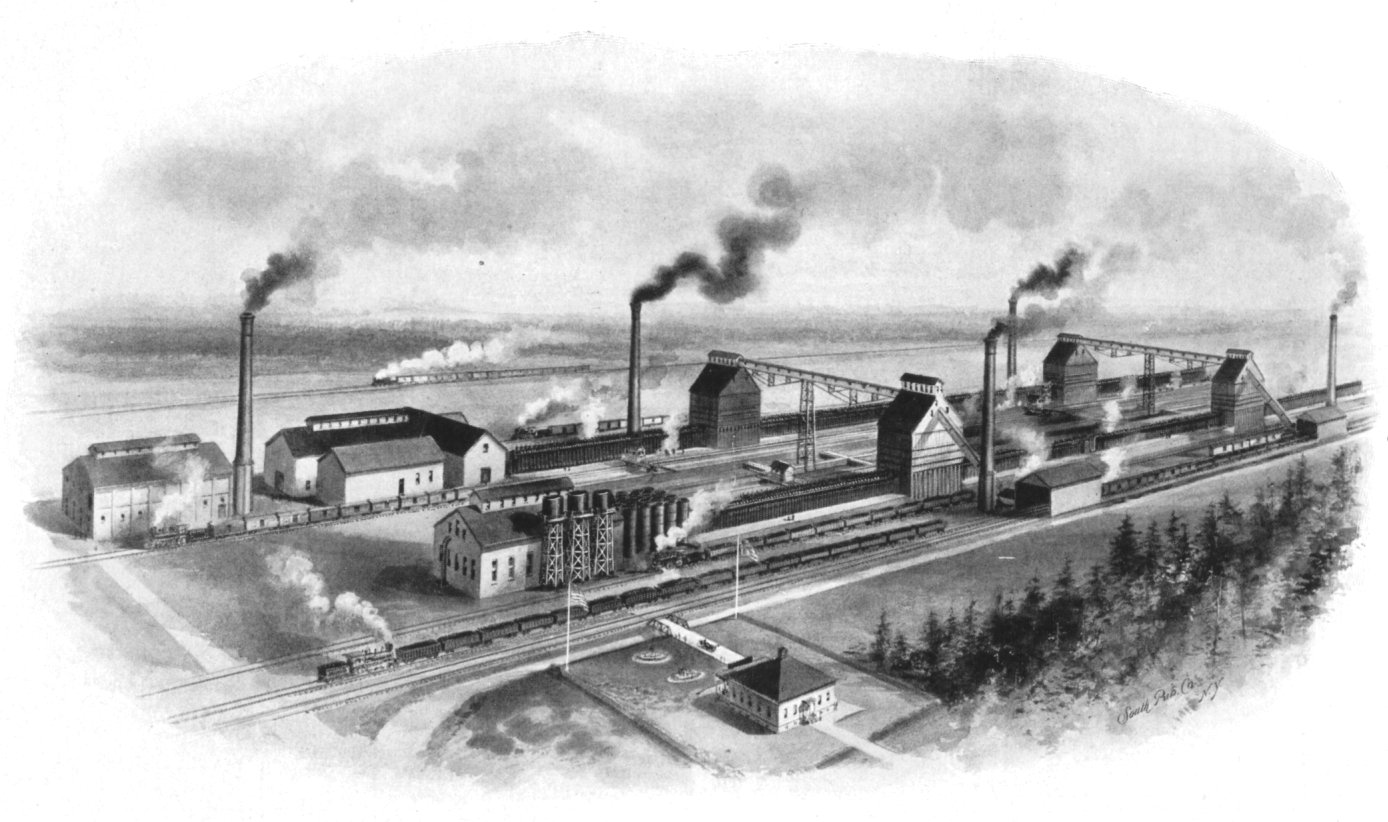
The Sydney Coke Ovens, c.1900.

In 1899, investors from Boston formed the Dominion Iron and Steel Company Limited and construction began of a major steel works on the eastern shore of Wintering Cove in Sydney Harbour. Sydney had everything needed for steelmaking, including locally mined coal, nearby iron ore from Bell Island and limestone from Aguathuna (both in Newfoundland), a good harbour for shipping, and plenty of cooling water. The mill opened in 1901, and by 1912 was turning out more than 800,000 tonnes of pig iron and 900,000 tonnes of crude steel – nearly half of Canada's steel production – and was the largest steel producer in North America.

The steel mill, and the nearby coal mines that fuelled it, operated for nearly a century under a variety of owners including Dominion Steel Company (1912), British Empire Steel Corporation (1921), and Dominion Steel and Coal Corporation (DOSCO) after 1930. An economically failing DOSCO was purchased by A.V. Roe Canada in 1957, which was in turn dissolved, and its assets, including DOSCO, purchased by Hawker Siddeley Canada in 1962. By the mid-1960s, Hawker Siddeley began to close money-losing subsidiaries and identified DOSCO's coal mines and steel mill as candidates for closure. By 1967, DOSCO announced plans to close the mill and began phasing out the coal mines. In response to the threatened loss of thousands of jobs in a region with poor economic prospects, the government of Nova Scotia expropriated the steel mill, renaming it Sydney Steel Corporation (SYSCO). The government of Canada expropriated DOSCO's coal mines at the same time, as well as the coke ovens that produced the pollution flowing into the Tar Ponds, naming this operation Cape Breton Development Corporation (DEVCO). SYSCO purchased the coke ovens from DEVCO in 1973.

Dominion Tar and Chemical Company Ltd (Domtar) operated a coal tar refining plant and a coal tar storage facility in Sydney from 1903 to 1962. This facility was situated directly adjacent to and north of the coke oven operations. It diverted coal tar from the coke ovens, refined it, moved it through pipes, and stored it in tanks for shipping elsewhere. Domtar ceased operations in Sydney in 1962 abandoning its storage tanks, waste disposal lagoons, pipes, buildings and equipment. Domtar conducted little or no clean up of the site. A large tank, referred to as the "Domtar tank", remained in place adjacent to the coke ovens site into the 2000s, measuring 28 m (92 ft) in diameter and 6 m (20 ft) high. It contained materials abandoned by Domtar and other materials added in the years since the facility's abandonment.

By the mid-1970s, the environmental movement was gaining headway in North America, and concern about pollution from the steel mill and coke ovens was rising. Environmental activists would subsequently uncover documents showing that the government was aware of environmental problems caused by the steel plant and coke ovens as early as 1972. In 1980, scientists from the Department of Fisheries and Oceans discovered polycyclic aromatic hydrocarbons (PAHs), a family of chemicals produced by incomplete combustion of organic material, in lobster caught in Sydney Harbour near Muggah Creek. These same toxic chemicals were found in the homes of nearby residents. They ordered the South Arm of the harbour closed to lobster fishing, and figured the Tar Ponds as the likely source of contamination.

The discovery increased pressure to close the decrepit coke ovens, which finally ceased production in 1988. Underneath the coke ovens site were approximately one hundred and sixty one kilometres of underground pipes. These pipes were used to move chemicals throughout the coke ovens and steel plant site. Despite the fact that these pipes contained a mixture of dangerous, toxic and potentially explosive substances, many were never purged of their contents when the coke ovens operations ceased. SYSCO converted to an electric arc manufacturing process in 1990, and stopped production altogether in 2000. The mill is now dismantled.

In 1986, Canada and Nova Scotia signed a $34-million agreement to dredge the Tar Ponds and pump the sediments through a mile-long pipeline to a low-temperature incinerator and power plant. After many delays, the incinerator was completed, and passed required air emissions tests, in 1994. However, the pipeline system proved unable to handle the thick, lumpy Tar Ponds sludge, and the fluid-bed incinerator was hit by a series of technical problems. The sediments were also found to contain "at least 50,000 tonnes" of PCB contaminants which could only be disposed of by high-temperature incineration. The project was abandoned in 1995.

In 1996, Gerry O'Malley, the Minister of Science and Technology, proposed a plan to bury the Tar Ponds under slag procured from the steel mill. By this time, the project had attracted local critics, who condemned the plan. Also in 1996, the federal, provincial, and municipal governments jointly funded a community organization, the Joint Action Group (JAG), with a mandate to "educate, involve and empower the community, through partnerships, to determine and implement acceptable solutions for Canada's worst hazardous waste site and to assess and address the impact on human health." The three governments also embarked on detailed environmental site assessments, and a variety of preliminary cleanup projects. Although JAG held more than 950 public meetings, no clear consensus on cleanup technologies emerged. Bruno Marcocchio, founder of the Citizen Liaison Committee, complained that the JAG was only being used "to give credibility to back room, politically motivated manipulation." Governments, meanwhile, generated more than 620 technical and scientific reports on the problem, and possible solutions. Carl Buchanan, JAG's chairman, said: "This is going to be the most complex environmental cleanup ever undertaken in this country, and maybe anywhere. It's never been done on this scale, and right in the middle of a city."

== Cleanup ==
On May 12, 2004, the Governments of Canada and Nova Scotia announced a 10-year, $400 million CAD plan to clean up the Sydney Tar Ponds and Coke Ovens. The plan called for PCB-contaminated sediments to be destroyed in an approved PCB incinerator to be set up temporarily at a decommissioned industrial facility five kilometres east of the coke ovens. Remaining materials would be treated in place and then contained within an engineered containment system.

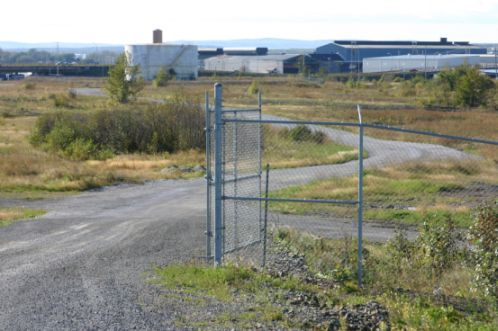
Byproducts from coke ovens that operated for 88 years on this site created run-off which contaminated the Muggah Creek estuary, creating the Sydney Tar Ponds. The coke ovens plant was demolished in the early 1990s, leaving this empty field which will be rehabilitated as part of the Tar Ponds project.

At the Tar Ponds, treatment consisted of solidification/stabilization with cement, a process by which contaminated sediments are mixed with Portland cement powder or similar hardening agents. At the coke ovens, contaminated soils were treated with a form of bioremediation known as 'landfarming', in which hydrocarbon-eating bacteria and nutrients are tilled into the upper surface of the soils. The sites were then contained within a layered cap and impermeable sidewalls, and landscaped.

A special operating agency of the Nova Scotia government, the Sydney Tar Ponds Agency, managed the cleanup on behalf of the two governments, in partnership with the Department of Public Works and Government Services which was the lead federal agency. Fifteen community groups in such fields as environment, health, business, labour, religion, recreation, municipal government, and higher education, contributed delegates to a Community Liaison Committee that served as a sounding board for project managers during the cleanup.

== Controversy ==
Establishing a cleanup plan for the Tar Ponds and coke ovens site took more than 22 years. Hundreds of volunteers contributed more than 100,000 hours to the Joint Action Group's search for acceptable cleanup options. JAG and its government partners attracted vocal critics, most prominently Sierra Club Canada. Delays in getting the project started left many residents frustrated.

Opinions divide on the best cleanup method. Some residents favoured digging up and destroying all of the contaminants. Others preferred not to disturb the contaminated material at all. Sierra Club Canada opposed plans to incinerate the PCB materials in favour of novel destruction technologies such as hydrogen reduction and soil washing. Project managers said the community asked that only proven technologies be used.

In 2005 and 2006, the Sydney Tar Ponds Agency undertook four preliminary cleanup projects, including the re-routing of the Coke Ovens Brook Connector to a less contaminated area, and the construction of a rock barrier at the boundary between the Tar Ponds and Sydney Harbour. The preliminary projects were intended to prevent further environmental damage while the larger cleanup was assessed.

In July 2006, the environmental engineering firm EarthTech, Ltd., completed a preliminary engineering design for the big cleanup. A contract for the final engineering design and construction oversight was expected to be set by September 2006.

== Environmental impact assessment ==
In 2001, residents were demanding that the Government move them out of the community.

Through the winter of 2005, controversy continued as to the type of environmental impact assessment the Government of Canada should require for the Tar Ponds cleanup. The choice boiled down to the two most rigorous forms of assessment allowed under the Canadian Environmental Assessment Act a comprehensive study, conducted by remediation experts within Public Works and Government Services Canada, and a panel review, conducted by a group of experts from outside government, who would hold formal public hearings.

The Government of Nova Scotia, the Cape Breton Regional Municipality, and a broad coalition of local business, labor, and health organizations favored a comprehensive study, which has half as many steps as a panel review. They argued that after 950 public meetings and 620 technical reports, the issue had been studied and debated enough, and it was time to get on with the cleanup. The Sierra Club of Canada favored a panel review as the only way to ensure necessary scrutiny of plans to incinerate PCB contaminated material, and to guarantee consideration of alternative technologies.

On May 2, 2005, federal Environment Minister Stéphane Dion and Public Works Minister Scott Brison sided with the Sierra Club, ordering a panel review. In the face of predictions that the decision would delay the cleanup and add to its cost, Dion directed the panel to complete its work by June 30, 2006, and not to make recommendations that would drive cleanup costs beyond the $400 million Ottawa and Nova Scotia had already committed. The province reluctantly agreed to participate, and the joint panel review held three weeks of sparsely attended hearings in April and May 2006.

== Solution ==
After decades of study, the federal and Nova Scotia governments concluded that the best way to deal with the Sydney Tar Ponds was to stabilize, solidify, and contain the contaminated material. In January 2007, officials from Ottawa and the province announced a $400-million plan to solidify the toxic sludge using the solidification/stabilization with cement (S/S) method. This technology was preferred over a controversial proposal to incinerate some of the 700,000 tonnes of sludge. Nordlys Environmental LP and ECC were awarded a $52-million contract in October 2009 to begin S/S operations.

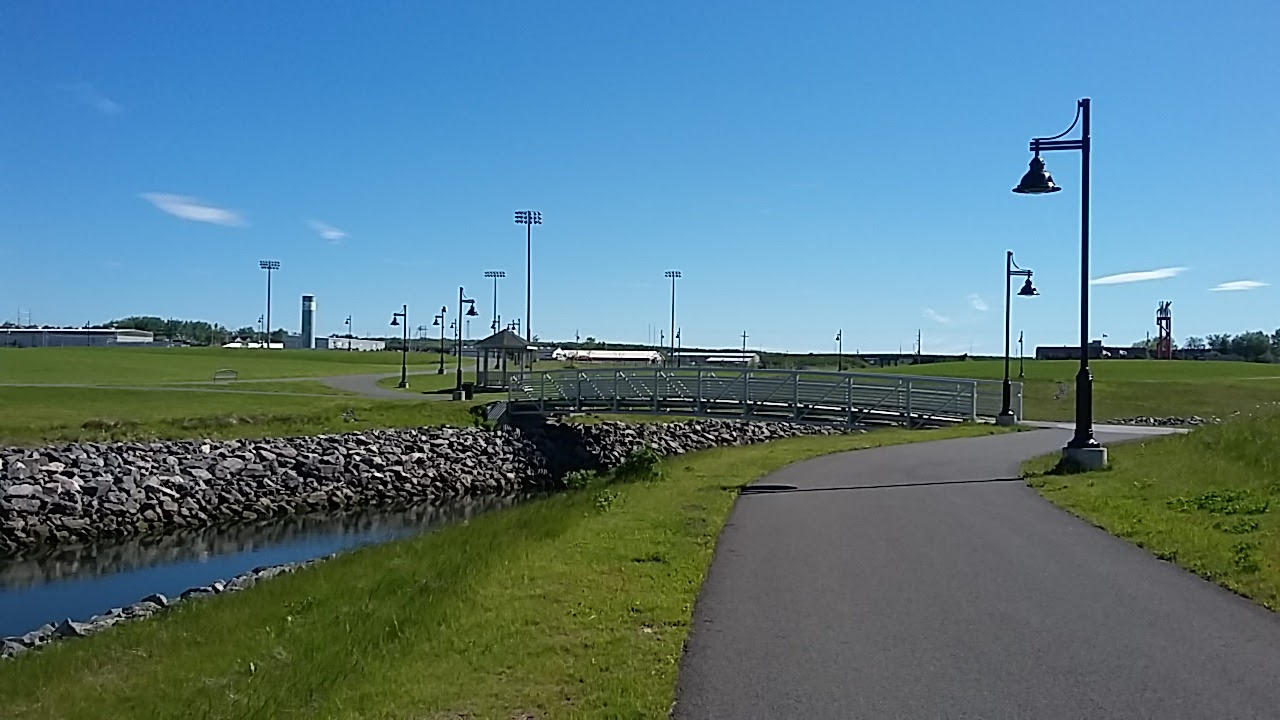
A public park at the former site of the tar ponds, called Open Hearth Park, in 2017

Environmentalists and local residents continued to worry officials would incinerate some of the material, though Federal and provincial officials claimed the S/S method they had chosen would stabilize the 100-hectare site without producing any adverse health or environmental effects. One way of verifying the potential for adverse health or environmental effects during remediation and clean up of the Sydney Tar Ponds and Coke Ovens site was via environmental effects monitoring prior to and during remediation activities. Dillon Consulting Limited was awarded the contract to monitor changes in chemical contaminants in groundwater, surface water and in the marine environment in Sydney Harbour during baseline (pre-construction / remediation) and during construction / remediation. The marine environment in Sydney Harbour was monitored as contaminants released via Muggah Creek have historically impacted harbour sediments and marine biota. Monitoring of Sydney Harbour sediments prior to and during remediation did not reveal evidence of adverse health or environmental effects due to remediation activities, and sediment quality improved due to natural recovery processes (i.e., burial of historically contaminated sediments by uncontaminated material).

The cleanup was completed in 2013 with the opening of Open Hearth Park which is situated on the site of the former steel plant and has hosted events such as an Aerosmith concert in September 2014.
