= Rocky Flats Plant =

Defunct American nuclear weapons manufacturing site in Colorado

- U.S. National Register of Historic Places
- U.S. Historic district
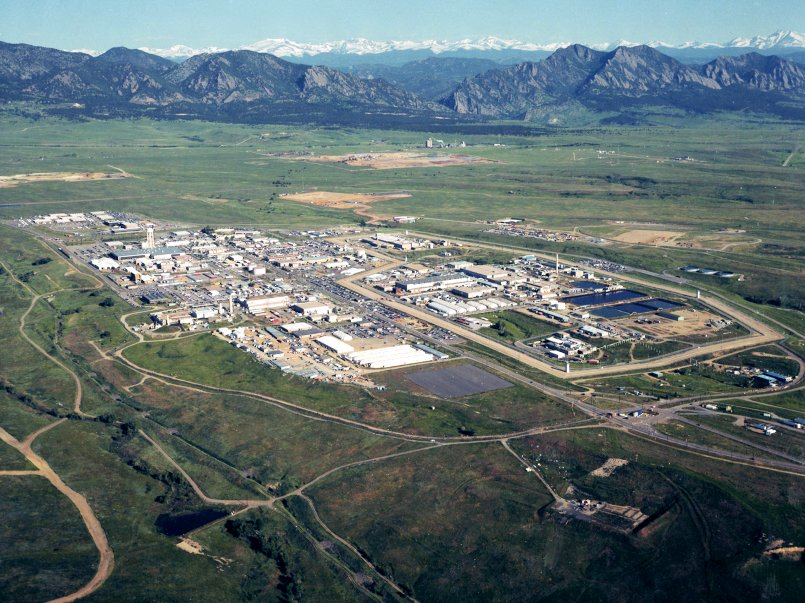
- July 1995

- Location within Colorado Location within the United States
- Location: Jefferson County, Colorado
- Nearest city: Arvada, Colorado
- Coordinates: 39.89°N 105.20°W
- Area: 175.8 acres (0.711 km^{2})
- Built: 1952
- Built by: Austin Construction Co.
- NRHP reference No.: 97000377
- Added to NRHP: May 19, 1997

The Rocky Flats Plant was a United States manufacturing complex that produced nuclear weapons parts near Denver, Colorado. The facility's primary mission was the fabrication of plutonium pits, the fissionable part of a bomb that produces a nuclear explosion. The pits were shipped to other facilities to be assembled into complete nuclear weapons. Operated from 1952 to 1992 by private contractors Dow Chemical Company, Rockwell International Corporation and EG&G, the complex was under the control of the U.S. Atomic Energy Commission (AEC), succeeded by the Department of Energy (DOE) in 1977. The plant manufactured 1,000 to 2,000 pits per year.

Plutonium pit production was halted in 1989 after EPA and FBI agents raided the facility and the plant was formally shut down in 1992. Rockwell then accepted a plea agreement for criminal violations of environmental law. At the time, the fine was one of the largest penalties ever in an environmental law case.

Cleanup began in the early 1990s, and the site achieved regulatory closure in 2006. The cleanup effort decommissioned and demolished the entire plant, removing more than 800 structures, over 21 tons of weapons-grade material, over 1.3 million cubic meters of waste, and treated more than 16 million US gallons (61,000 m^{3}) of water. Four groundwater treatment systems were also constructed. The site of the former facility consists of two distinct areas: the "Central Operable Unit", which remains off-limits to the public as a CERCLA Superfund site, owned and managed by the U.S. Department of Energy, and the Rocky Flats National Wildlife Refuge, owned and managed by the U.S. Fish and Wildlife Service. Every five years, the U.S. Department of Energy, U.S. Environmental Protection Agency, and Colorado Department of Public Health and Environment review environmental data and other information to assess whether the remedy is functioning as intended. The latest Five-Year Review for the site, released in August 2022, concluded the site remedy is protective of human health and the environment. However, a protectiveness deferred determination was made for PFAS.

== History ==
=== 1950s ===
US nuclear weapons stockpile 1950-1967. The stockpile peaked in 1967.

Following World War II, the United States increased production of nuclear weapons. A 4-square-mile (10 km^{2}) site about 15 miles (25 km) northwest of Denver on a windy plateau called Rocky Flats was chosen for the facility. Contemporary news reports stated that the site would not be used to produce nuclear bombs, but might be used to produce uranium and plutonium components for use in nuclear weapons.

The construction of Rocky Flats began in July 1951 and was a significant boon to the Colorado economy. Colorado state highways 72 and 93 were constructed to access the plant. Direct government construction contracts to Colorado business were worth $26 million ($315 million in 2025) and employed 2,800 people.

By April 1953, the plant began operating under Dow Chemical company. What the plant made, when construction was finished, when it began making its products, and how much product it was making was secret. Routine production processes began immediately leaking plutonium into the atmosphere. A later study on the risks to public health from Rocky Flats estimated that normal operations leaked up to 130,000 microcuries of plutonium annually into the atmosphere as part of its production processes during the 1950s. This routine leakage declined in the 1960s and continued down to 60 picocuries in 1989. For residents living in the area most contaminated by Rocky Flats, this is a comparable exposure to the plutonium from fallout of nuclear weapons testing. This does not include the much higher levels of exposure as a result of the later fires.

Rocky Flats was established next to Walnut Creek and Woman Creek. Until the construction of a waste treatment facility in 1957, plutonium contaminated wastewater was discharged directly into Walnut Creek which flowed into Broomfield's drinking water supply. In 1953, a retention pond was built along Walnut Creek which accumulated plutonium in its soil. In addition to plutonium and uranium contamination, the pond absorbed chemicals used in the production process such as algicides and chromates. Sewer water was originally designed to route to trenches on the property. The original wastewater system was not 100% isolated from the sewer, resulting in the trenches also being contaminated with uranium and plutonium. These trenches filled up in 1968.

The AEC called Rocky Flats a "Weapon Production Facility" in a 1956 report. At this time, the plant was expanded with an additional $18.4 million ($218 million in 2025) investment from the AEC.

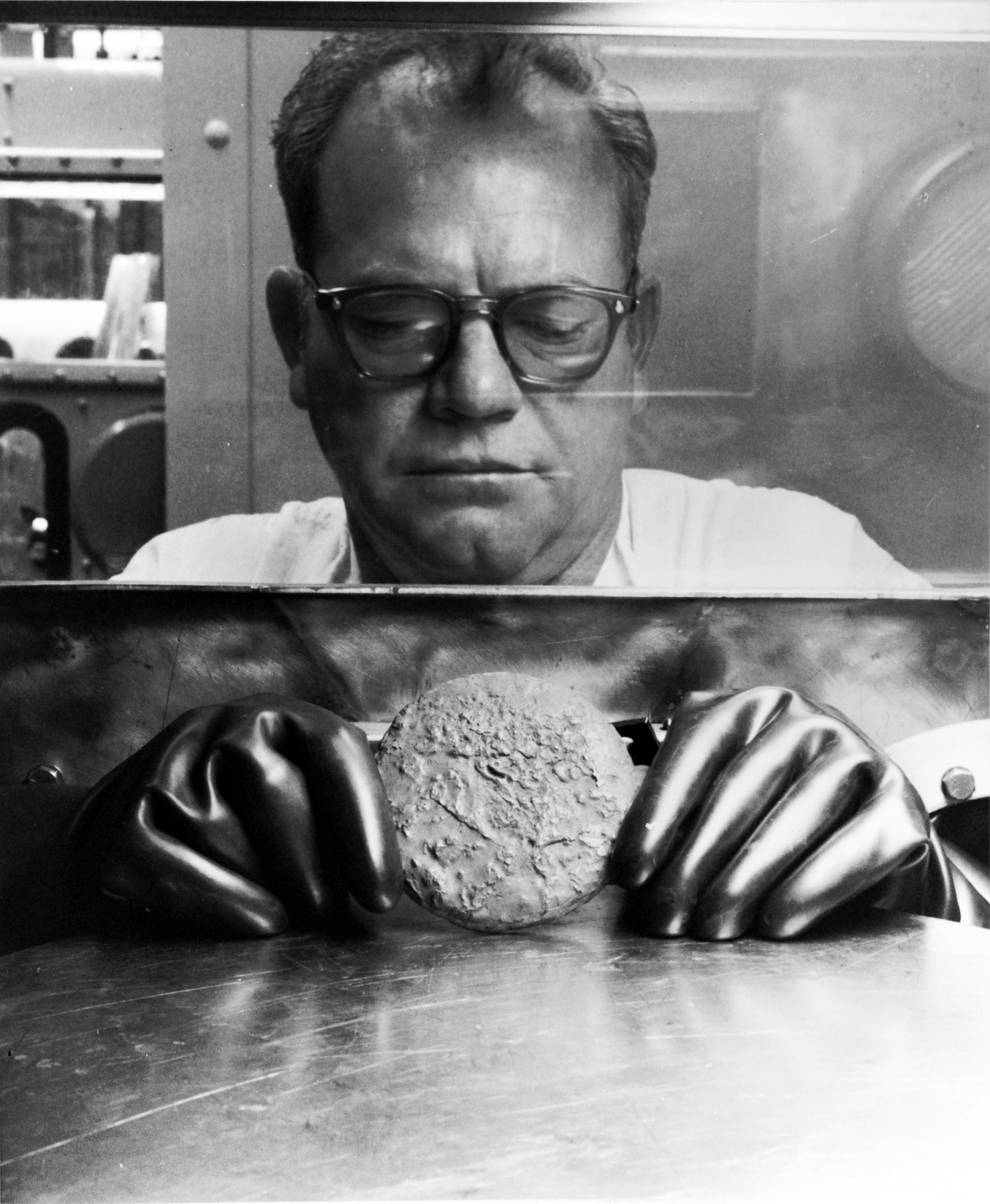
Worker holding plutonium "button" in glove box

In June 1957 two employees were taken to the onsite hospital after an explosion in the production line. They were treated for cuts from flying glass and exposure to plutonium.

On September 11, 1957, a plutonium fire occurred in one of the gloveboxes used to handle radioactive materials, igniting the combustible rubber gloves and plexiglas windows of the box. Metallic plutonium is a fire hazard and pyrophoric; under the right conditions it may ignite in air at room temperature. The fire escaped containment in under thirty minutes and the firefighters were forced to use water, a risky decision on plutonium fire, to put out the fire in the glovebox. After putting out the original source, there was an explosion in the ventilation system. The fire burned the filters that normally removed the plutonium from the building's air resulting in the release of 21 curies of plutonium into the atmosphere. For comparison the Fat Man, used 448 curies of plutonium for its core. The accident resulted in the contamination of Building 771 and caused $818,600 ($9.38 million in 2025) in damage. At the time, the AEC spokesman significantly downplayed the risk of plutonium exposure and estimated only $50,000 in damages.

An incinerator for plutonium-contaminated waste was installed in Building 771 in 1958. The offgas was treated with scrubbers and filters and eventually released to the atmosphere. The ash was occasionally able to be reprocessed for plutonium recovery.

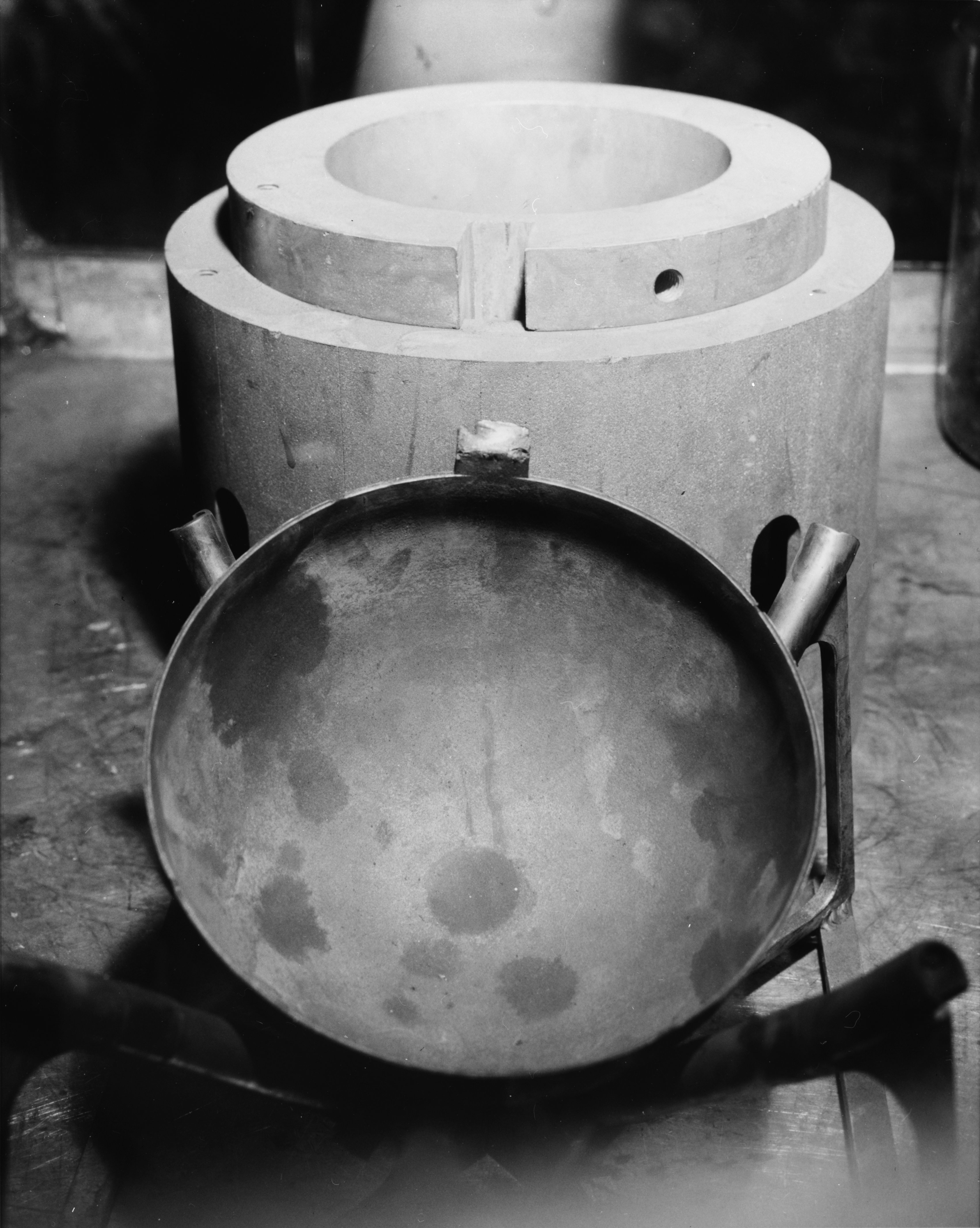
Precision plutonium foundry mold, 1959

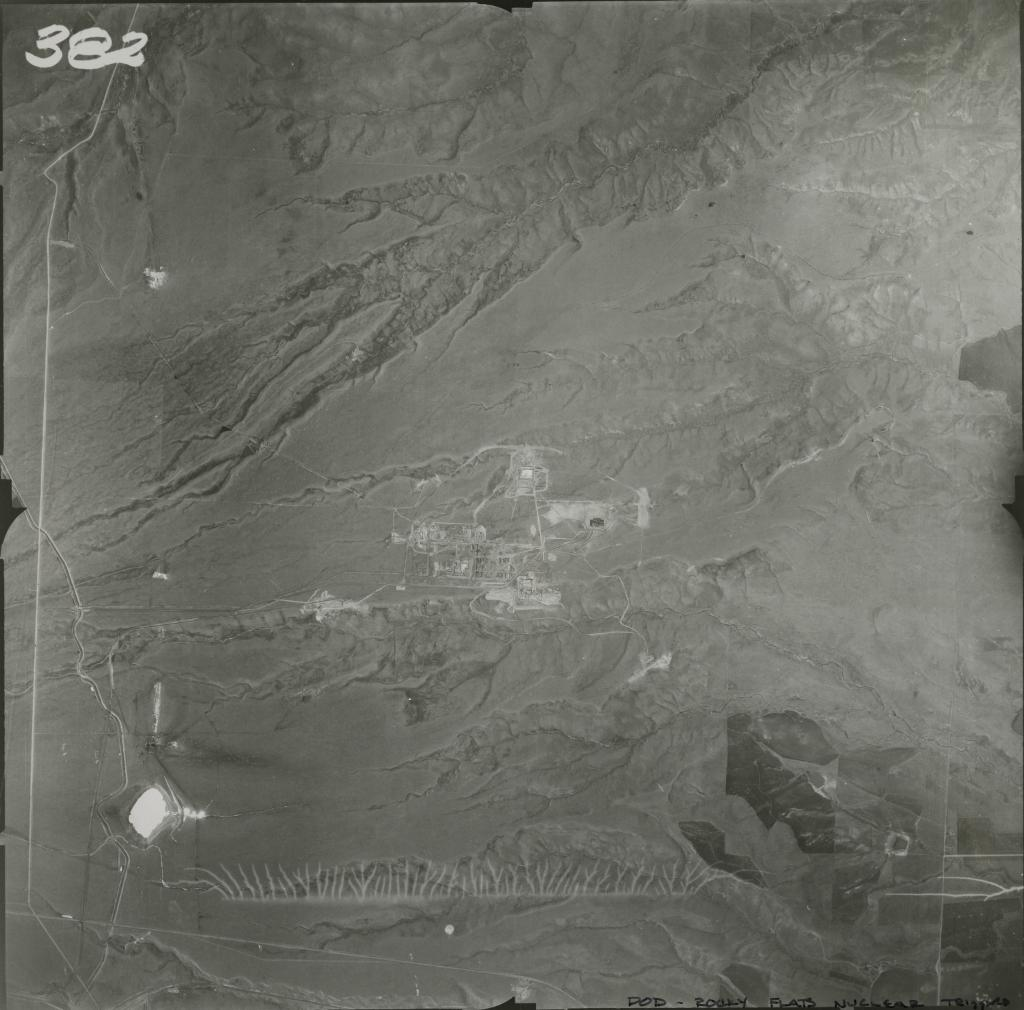
Undated aerial photograph looking down on the plant from above

=== 1960s ===
In 1960, one of the workers who responded to the 1957 fire petitioned the state legislature to create a way for workers that receive unsafe doses of radiation on the job to be compensated for the health effects. Smaller incidents, such as a 1962 fire, continued to threaten the safety of the workers without posing a significant public health risk.

Throughout the 1960s, the plant continued to enlarge and add buildings. The AEC sponsored $4.5 million ($49 million in 2025) in new construction contracts at Rocky Flats for 1960 and $3 million in 1962 ($31.9 million in 2025). Payroll reached $26 million annually by 1962.

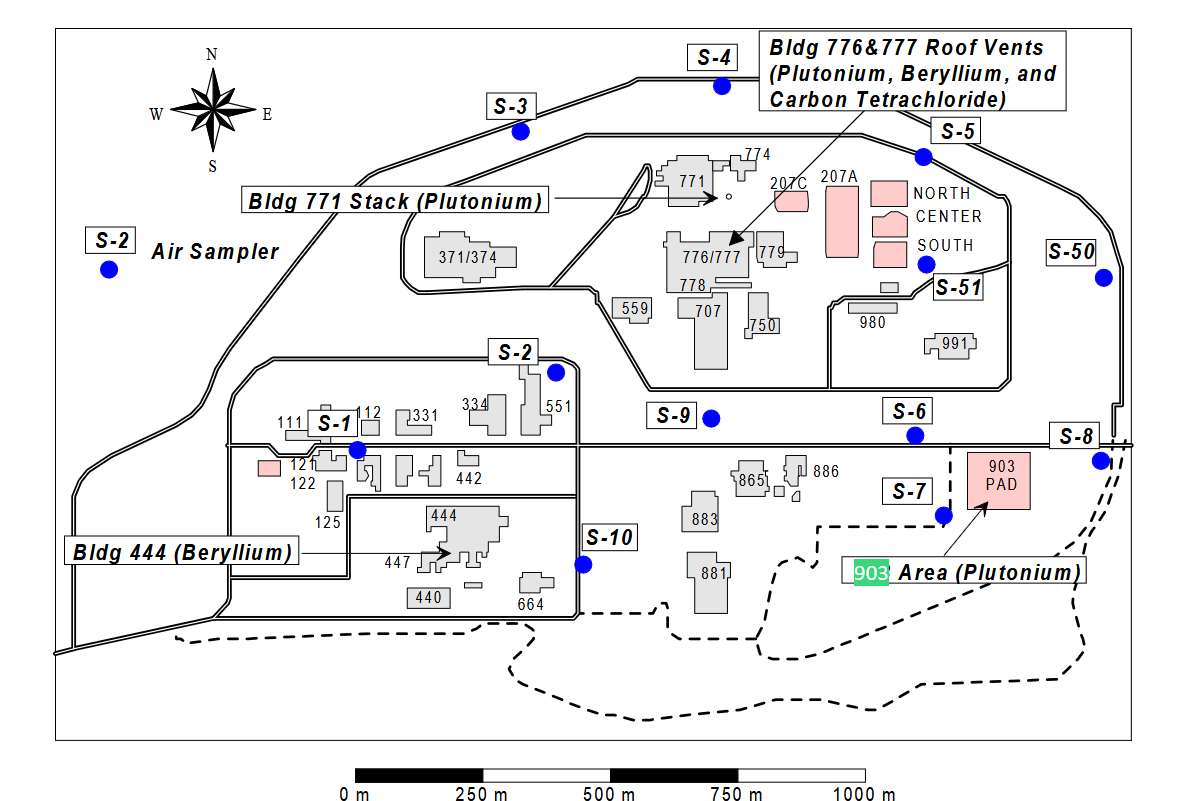
Map of Rocky Flats with 903 Area highlighted.

The 1960s also brought more contamination to the site. By 1967, 3,500 barrels (560 m^{3}) of plutonium-contaminated lubricants and solvents had accumulated on Pad 903. A large number of them were found to be leaking, and low-level contaminated soil was becoming wind-borne from this area. At least some of the leakage had been detected as early as 1962. From 1954-1970, radioactive waste, including the barrels, was moved to Idaho National Laboratory. After removing the barrels, it was discovered that the winds, which frequently exceeded 100mph, had moved plutonium contaminated soil off the 903 Area. It was then paved over with asphalt in 1969 to prevent further spread of the contaminated soil. Later analysis completed in 1999 for the CDPHE estimated that between 6 and 58 curies of plutonium spilled on to Pad 903 soil due to barrel leakage.

In 1965, there were at least 24 fires at the plant. In the worst of these, 400 employees were exposed to airborne plutonium. Twenty-five workers received over seventeen times the federal limit for plutonium exposure.

In 1968, Dow Chemical covered up leaks of tritium through the plant's smokestack. They chose not install an alarm system to notify the plant of ongoing leakage of radioactive material. In 1972 the AEC disclosed information about these leaks to the public. However, the details as to why there was tritium at Rocky Flats in the first place were classified and remained classified at least through 1992.

==== Mother's Day 1969 Fire ====
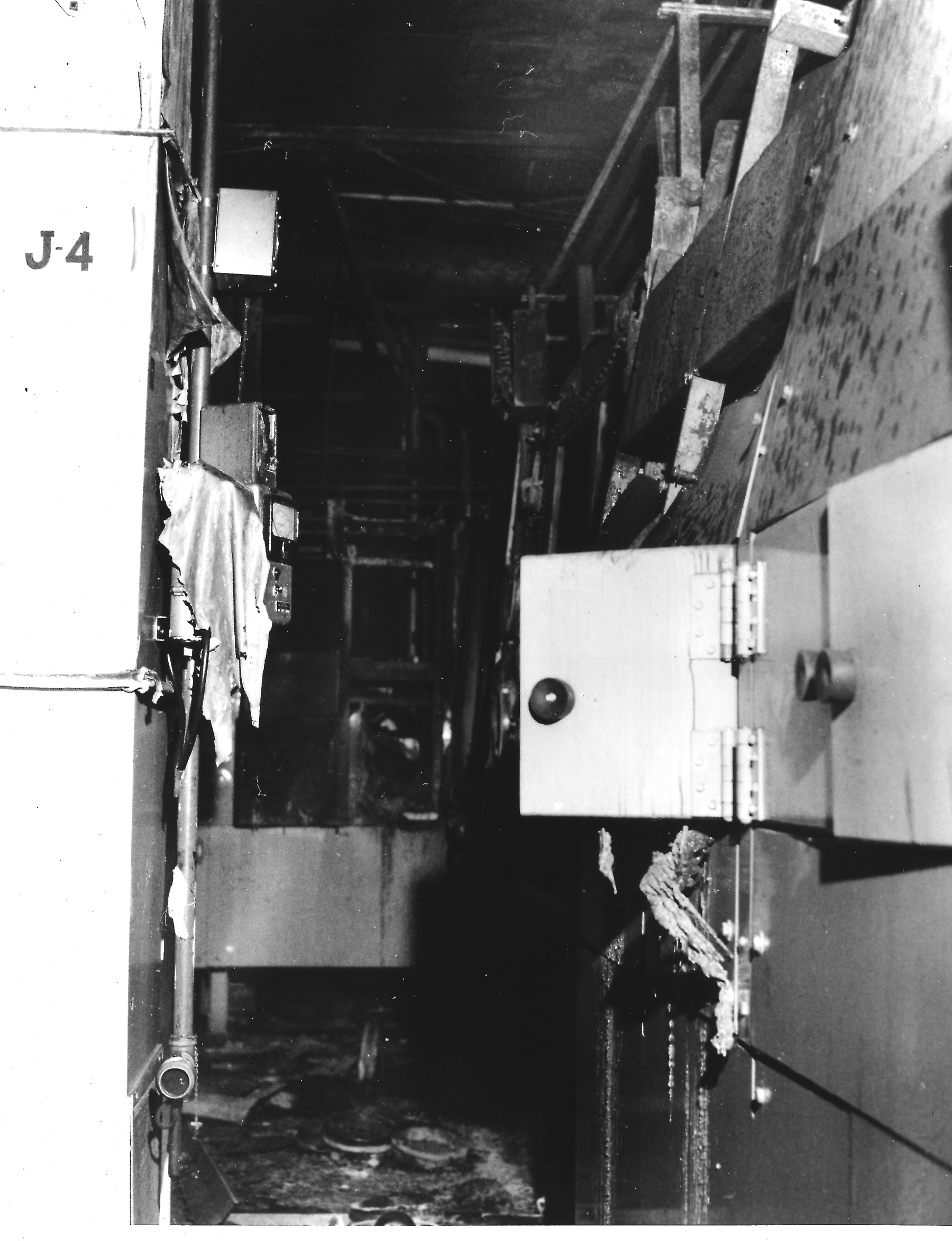
Room damaged by 1969 Rocky Flats Fire

On May 11, 1969, there was a major fire in a glovebox in Building 776/777. Later investigations disagree on what caused the fire and what time it began. The 1999 report for the Colorado Department of Public Health and Environment said the fire was started around 2pm by a pressed plutonium block which spontaneously ignited. This agrees with some contemporary accounts and the AEC's position. Other fire investigators said the fire was started around 10am by plutonium-contaminated oil rags, and the AEC buried that information to protect individuals from liability. Given the fire crew's experience with the 1957 fire, the fire captain again determined to use water to put out the fire. After six hours the fire was extinguished. The AEC commended the heroism of the firefighters. As in the 1957 fire, the air filters which normally removed plutonium from the building's exhaust were destroyed by the fire, and in this case between 10 and 60 mCi of plutonium was released.

This was likely the costliest industrial accident to occur in the United States up to that time. Approximately $20 million of plutonium was consumed in the fire and there were $50 million ($439 million in 2025) of other damages. Congress granted $45 million of the funding for the repairs in an emergency, closed door session at the AEC's request. Cleanup from the accident took two years. Much of the plutonium was recovered during the cleanup.

The U.S. congress ordered an investigation into the accident, which found government officials helped cover up details of the fire by abusing classified information protocols. National Center for Atmospheric Research scientists stated that plant officials also misled the public in press statements about the size and damage from the fire. Dow Chemical employees falsely claimed that their air filtration systems continued to work during the fire and no plutonium was released into the atmosphere. The investigation also found that the AEC ignored safety recommendations after the 1957 fire which may have prevented this accident. The investigation recommended extensive improvements to the building to increase safety. AEC officials such as Major General Giller and Chairman Glenn Seaborg publicly emphasized the need to keep Rocky Flats running and not allow the damage from the fire to delay the Safeguard Program. Senator Robert Byrd highlighted the interdependence of the AEC sites such as Los Alamos, Hanford, and Rocky Flats. Only at the end of the 1400 page congressional testimony did the government recognize that the fire had halted all US nuclear weapons production capability. Leo Goodman, a consultant for the United Auto Workers, criticized Seaborg's leadership of the AEC because Seaborg owned the patent on the discovery of plutonium and was profiting off the AEC's plutonium production.

=== 1970s ===
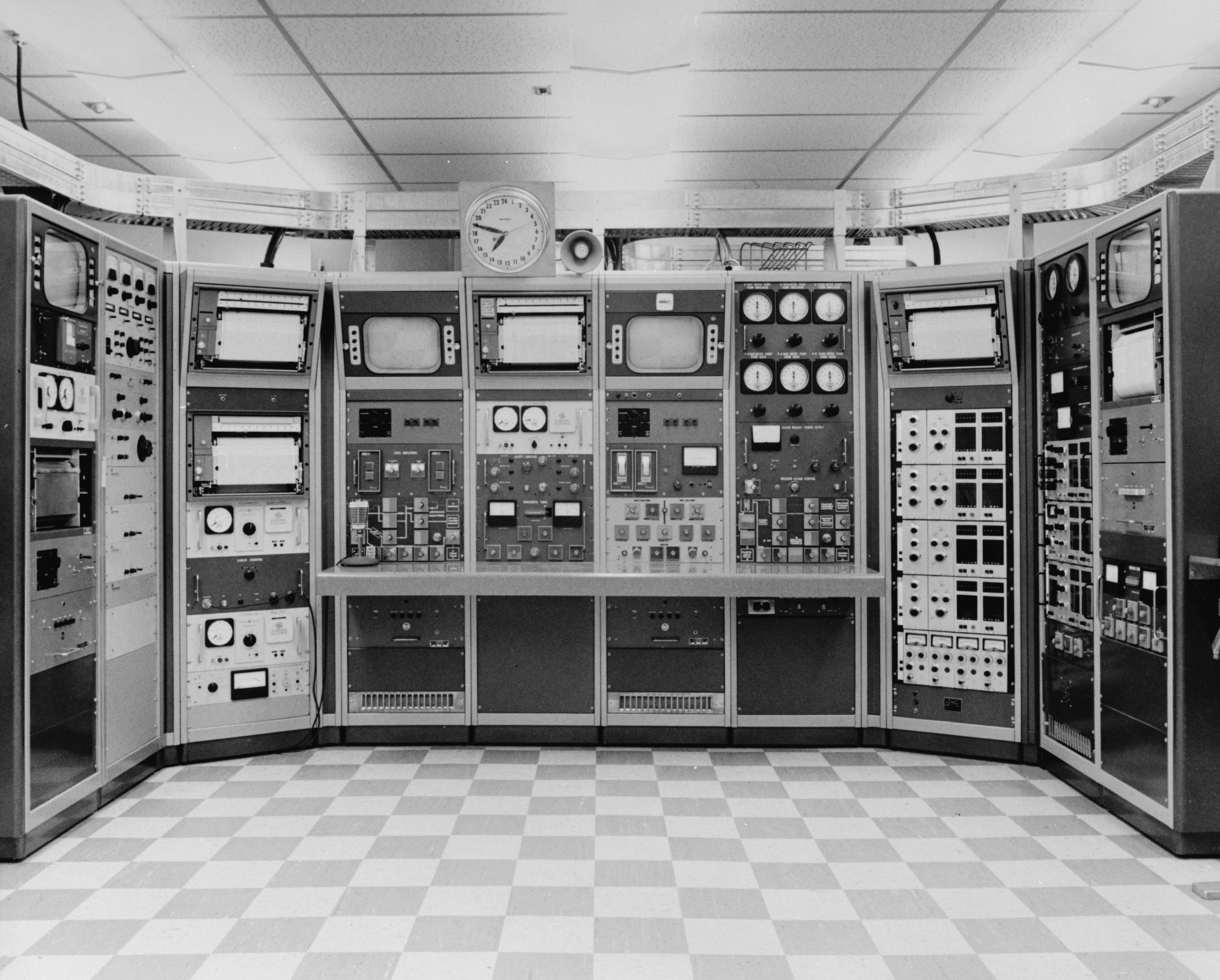
Control panel, Critical Mass Laboratory, 1970

In 1970, some members of the public with scientific backgrounds formed the Colorado Committee for Environmental Information to seek information about the public health impact of Rocky Flats. They encouraged the AEC to relocate the plant, but the AEC rejected the idea on the basis that the cost of at least $500 million ($3.85 billion in 2025) was unacceptable.

Throughout 1969, Dow Chemical refused to cooperate with outside investigations into plutonium contamination in the soil around Rocky Flats. Several independent investigations brought their findings of plutonium contamination in the soil to the AEC, and the AEC refused to discuss the matters. Dow maintained that there was no public health risk from Rocky Flats operation but conceded that they could not say if there was one in the past. Furthermore, they admitted that the plant was averaging five fires a year, nearly all of which were unreported to the public. The investigations into the 1969 fire resulted in Major General Giller, head of the AEC weapons department, reversing AEC policy by ordering his staff to cooperate with public health officials.

The Colorado Department of Health announced its surprise when they learned, only after Giller's new policy, that Rocky Flats was burying radioactive waste in violation of state law. As an AEC supplier, Rocky Flats was exempt from these laws. In 1971, some officials from the state health department were granted access to the Rocky Flats Plant and determined that there was no risk to public health at that time, but there could be one if proper precautions were not taken.

In 1971, James Hanes replaced Lloyd Joshel as the general manager at Rocky Flats. Under his tenure, accidents which endangered employees continued to occur.

In 1972, Giller announced the AEC's $130 million investment ($1 billion in 2025) for remodeling of the Rocky Flats Plant primarily to improve safety systems. Fire sprinkler systems and firewalls were built during the reconstruction. In 1974, public reporters highlighted that Rocky Flats was unable to account for thousands of pounds of plutonium within the plant. Giller addressed these concerns in a January 1975 press conference where he stated that the missing plutonium was stuck inside of machinery and ventilation. He had earlier stated that less than 0.01% of the plant's nuclear material was missing, but it was still more than enough material to make a nuclear weapon. He then claimed the plant had a "very small amount of uranium" which the AEC corrected the next day because the plant actually had approximately two thousand pounds of enriched uranium.

In order to reduce the danger of public contamination and to create a security area around the plant following protests, the United States Congress authorized $6 million ($46.2 million in 2025) for the purchase of a 4,600-acre (19 km^{2}) buffer zone around the plant in 1972.

From 1971 to 1973, the retention ponds along Walnut Creek, which had accumulated plutonium and other toxins from the plant's wastewater, were reconstructed. This resulted in a significant increase in Walnut Creek's plutonium concentration.

In 1973, Walnut Creek and the Great Western Reservoir were found to have elevated tritium and strontium levels. Discovery of the contamination by the Colorado Department of Health led to investigations by the AEC and United States Environmental Protection Agency (EPA). The AEC investigation stated that the tritium originated at Lawrence Livermore Laboratory, and 500-2000 curies were accidentally shipped to Rocky Flats in contaminated plutonium. Their internal investigation also stated this was not the first time tritium was accidentally shipped to Rocky Flats but that it had not been previously discovered because prior shipments contained 29-57 curies. State officials reported that it was unlikely the tritium posed a risk to public health, but Dow Chemical filed worker's compensation claims for at least ten of their employees exposed to tritium. As a result of the investigation, several mitigation efforts were put in place to prevent further contamination. In 1977, a reverse osmosis facility was added to Rocky Flats to clean up wastewater. The plant thereafter attempted to evaporate and solidify all liquid wastes in order to transport the solids to radioactive waste facilities.

In 1974, elevated plutonium levels were found in the topsoil near the now-covered Pad 903. A multi-state citizen's group sued the AEC to give the EPA permission to measure radioactive hazards from the AEC's sites.

A gas control system with HEPA filters prevented the air in gloveboxes from carrying plutonium into the atmosphere. However, in 1974, operator error was detected by the exhaust sampling system when approximately a milicurie of plutonium was released. Following the incident a more robust system with two layers of HEPA filters was installed.

When the AEC opened the Rocky Flats contract for public bidding, in 1973, Dow Chemical decided not to submit a bid to extend their contract. In 1975, Rockwell International replaced Dow Chemical as the contractor for the site. Rockwell received a $2.5 million ($15 million in 2025) annual management fee as well as indemnification and funds for other expenses.

In 1975, Congressman Tim Wirth and Governor Dick Lamm began advocating for a phase out of Rocky Flats' operations. They also began a state task force for investigating Rocky Flats. The task force reported that the plant had never conducted drills of its emergency plans which involved coordinating with other state and county offices. The task force recommended Rocky Flats be shut down. During the investigation, nearby landowners sought compensation for decreased property values due to fear of plutonium contamination. The Energy Research and Development Administration responded to the task force in 1976 and updated the cost estimate to move the plant to $2 billion ($11.3 billion in 2025). They further stated that there was no reason to move the plant. Wirth indicated that the response was a sign of improved communication.

Dr. Carl Johnson, Jefferson County health director from 1973 to 1981, directed numerous studies on contamination levels and health risks the plant posed to public health. Based on his conclusions, Johnson opposed housing development near Rocky Flats. In 1985, after hearing from various experts, the U.S. District Court for the District Court of Colorado found the results of Dr. Carl Johnson's study were "unreliable because the reported relationship seems implausible given the latency period for the types of cancer reported and because the excess cancers are different from the types of cancers expected to result from internally deposited plutonium." In addition, the court agreed with the Colorado State epidemiologist that "no measurable increases in cancer incidence resulting from operations at Rocky Flats have been demonstrated by any appropriate scientific method." To date, there has never been an epidemiological study of people who lived or live near the Rocky Flats site. Kristen Iversen, author of Full Body Burden: Growing Up in the Nuclear Shadow of Rocky Flats, contends later studies confirmed many of his findings.

Dr. John Candler Cobb, Professor of Preventive Medicine at the University of Colorado Medical Center, led a study for the EPA which found that residents near Rocky Flats had higher concentrations of plutonium in their lungs than those further away. This study was funded after a previous study on cattle showed similar results. He later testified that the most significant danger of radioactive contamination came from the 1967 incident in which oil barrels containing plutonium leaked 5,000 US gallons (19,000 L) of oil into sand under the barrels, which was then blown by strong winds as far away as Denver.

=== 1980s ===
A perimeter security zone was installed around the facility in 1983 and was upgraded with remote detection abilities in 1985. Also in 1983, the first radioactive waste was processed through the aqueous recovery system, creating a plutonium button.

A plant safety official, Jim Stone, warned Rockwell that their employees were being exposed to unsafe levels of beryllium in 1984. He was fired in 1986 for whistleblowing. The plant used beryllium as part of the weapons manufacturing process. Stone later claimed that Rockwell would fire employees who had been exposed in order to limit their liability for the health of their employees. Twelve Rocky Flats workers were discovered to have berylliosis, a lung disease cause by beryllium, as part of DOE testing. These findings spurred the DOE to investigate berylliosis in all their facilities. The ChemRisk investigation stated Rocky Flats only did its own beryllium component manufacturing from 1958-1975 and that all beryllium was cleaned up by 1980. Beryllium components continued to be used in Rocky Flats operations but were manufactured off site.

A celebration of 250,000 continuous safe hours by the employees at Rocky Flats happened in 1985. The same year, Rockwell received Industrial Research Magazine's IR-100 award for a process to remove actinide contamination from wastewater at the plant. The next year, the site received a National Safety Council Award of Honor for outstanding safety performance.

In 1986, the State of Colorado's Public Health Department, EPA, and DOE entered into a compliance agreement with the goal of bringing the facility into compliance with RCRA and Colorado Hazardous Waste Act permitting, generator, and waste management requirements. The agreement also initiated a process for investigating and remediating environmental contamination. In addition, the agreement established a framework addressing DOE's mixed-waste.

In 1988, a Department of Energy (DOE) safety evaluation resulted in a report that was critical of safety measures at the plant. The EPA fined the plant for polychlorinated biphenyl (PCB) leaks from a transformer. A solid waste form, called pondcrete, was found not to have cured properly and was leaking from containers. A boxcar of transuranic waste from the site was refused entry into Idaho and returned to the plant. Plans to potentially close the plant were released.

In 1989 an employee left a faucet running, resulting in chromic acid being released into the sanitary water system. The Colorado Department of Health and the EPA both posted full-time personnel at the plant to monitor safety. Plutonium production was suspended due to safety violations.

==== FBI/EPA investigation, June 1989 raid ====
In 1987, plant insiders started to covertly inform the Environmental Protection Agency (EPA) and the Federal Bureau of Investigation (FBI) about the unsafe conditions. In December 1988, the FBI commenced clandestine flights of light aircraft over the area and confirmed via infrared video recordings that the "outdated and unpermitted" Building 771 incinerator was apparently being used late into the night. After several months of collecting evidence both from workers and via direct measurement in 1989, the FBI informed the DOE on June 6 that they wanted to meet to discuss a potential terrorist threat.

On June 6, 1989, the United States District Court for the District Court of Colorado issued a search warrant to the FBI, based in part on information collected by Colorado Department of Health (now CDPHE) inspectors during the 1980s. Dubbed "Operation Desert Glow", the raid, sponsored by the United States Department of Justice (DOJ), began at 9 a.m. on June 6. After arriving in the meeting room, the FBI agents revealed the true reason for the meeting to stunned DOE and Rockwell officials, including Dominic Sanchini, Rockwell International's manager of Rocky Flats, who died the next year in Boulder of cancer. The FBI discovered numerous violations of federal anti-pollution laws, including limited contamination of water and soil. In 1992, Rockwell International was charged with environmental crimes, including violations of the Resource Conservation and Recovery Act (RCRA) and the Clean Water Act. Rockwell pleaded guilty and paid an $18.5 million fine. This was the largest fine for an environmental crime to that date.

After the FBI raid, federal authorities used the subsequent grand jury investigation to gather evidence of wrongdoing and then sealed the record. In October 2006, DOE announced completion of the Rocky Flats cleanup without this information being available.

The FBI raid led to the formation of Colorado's first special grand jury in 1989, the juried testimony of 110 witnesses, reviews of 2,000 exhibits, and ultimately a 1992 plea agreement in which Rockwell admitted to 10 federal environmental crimes and agreed to pay $18.5 million in fines out of its own funds. This amount was less than the company had been paid in bonuses for running the plant as determined by the Government Accounting Office (GAO), and yet was also by far the highest hazardous-waste fine ever; four times larger than the previous record. Due to indemnification of nuclear contractors, without some form of settlement being arrived at between the U.S. Justice Department and Rockwell, the cost of paying any civil penalties would ultimately have been borne by U.S. taxpayers. Criminal penalties allotted to Rockwell would likely also not have been covered because the Department of Energy had specifically exempted them from most environmental laws including hazardous waste.

Regardless, and as forewarned by the prosecuting U.S. Attorney, Ken Fimberg/Scott, the Department of Justice's stated findings and plea agreement with Rockwell were heavily contested by its own, 23-member special grand jury. Press leaks on both sides—members of the DOJ and the grand jury—occurred in violation of secrecy regarding grand jury information, a federal crime punishable by a prison sentence. The public contest led to U.S. Congressional oversight committee hearings chaired by Congressman Howard Wolpe, which issued subpoenas to DOJ principals despite several instances of DOJ's refusal to comply. The hearings, whose findings include that the Justice Department had "bargained away the truth", ultimately still did not fully reveal to the public the special grand jury's report, which remains sealed by the DOJ courts.

The special grand jury report was, nonetheless, leaked to Denver's independent weekly newspaper, Westword. According to its subsequent publications, the Rocky Flats special grand jury had compiled indictments charging three DOE officials and five Rockwell employees with environmental crimes. The grand jury also wrote a report, intended for the public's consumption per their charter, lambasting the conduct of DOE and Rocky Flats contractors for "engaging in a continuing campaign of distraction, deception and dishonesty" and noted that Rocky Flats, for many years, had discharged pollutants, hazardous materials and radioactive matter into nearby creeks and Broomfield's and Westminster's water supplies.

The DOE itself, in a study released in December of the year prior to the FBI raid, had called Rocky Flats' ground water the single greatest environmental hazard at any of its nuclear facilities.

==== Sealed grand jury records ====
Court records from the grand jury proceeding on Rocky Flats have been sealed for a number of years. The Federal Rules of Criminal Procedure, which govern federal grand jury proceedings, explicitly require grand jury proceedings to be kept secret unless otherwise provided by the Rules. Rocky Flats' secret grand jury proceedings were not unique.

However, some activists dispute the reasons for records confidentiality: Dr. LeRoy Moore, a Boulder theologian and peace activist; retired FBI Special Agent Jon Lipsky, who led the FBI's raid of the Rocky Flats plant to investigate illegal plutonium burning and other environmental crimes; and Wes McKinley, who was the foreman of the grand jury investigation into the operations at Rocky Flats (and served several terms as Colorado State Representative).

Former grand jury foreman McKinley chronicles his experiences in the 2004 book he co-authored with attorney Caron Balkany, The Ambushed Grand Jury, which begins with an open letter to the U.S. Congress from Special Agent Lipsky:

I am an FBI agent. My superiors have ordered me to lie about a criminal investigation I headed in 1989. We were investigating the US Department of Energy, but the US Justice Department covered up the truth.

I have refused to follow the orders to lie about what really happened during that criminal investigation at Rocky Flats Nuclear Weapons Plant. Instead, I have told the author of this book the truth. Her promise to me, if I told her what really happened, was that she would put it in a book to tell Congress and the American people.

Some dangerous decisions are now being made based on that government cover-up. Please read this book. I believe you know what needs to happen.

However, a former EPA employee and Jon Lipsky's partner disputes these claims: "Jon kind of went off the deep end," and "He started seeing conspiracy theories in everything."

=== 1990s ===
Rockwell International was replaced by EG&G as primary contractor for the Rocky Flats plant. EG&G began an aggressive work safety and cleanup plan for the site that included construction of a system to remove contamination from the groundwater of the site. The Sierra Club vs. Rockwell case was decided in favor of the Sierra Club. The ruling directed Rocky Flats to manage plutonium residues as hazardous waste.

In 1991, an interagency agreement between DOE, the Colorado Department of Health, and the EPA outlined multiyear schedules for environmental restoration studies and remediation activities. DOE released a report that advocated downsizing the plant's production into a more streamlined facility. Due to the fall of the Soviet Union, production of most of the systems at Rocky Flats was no longer needed, leaving only the W88 warhead primary stages.

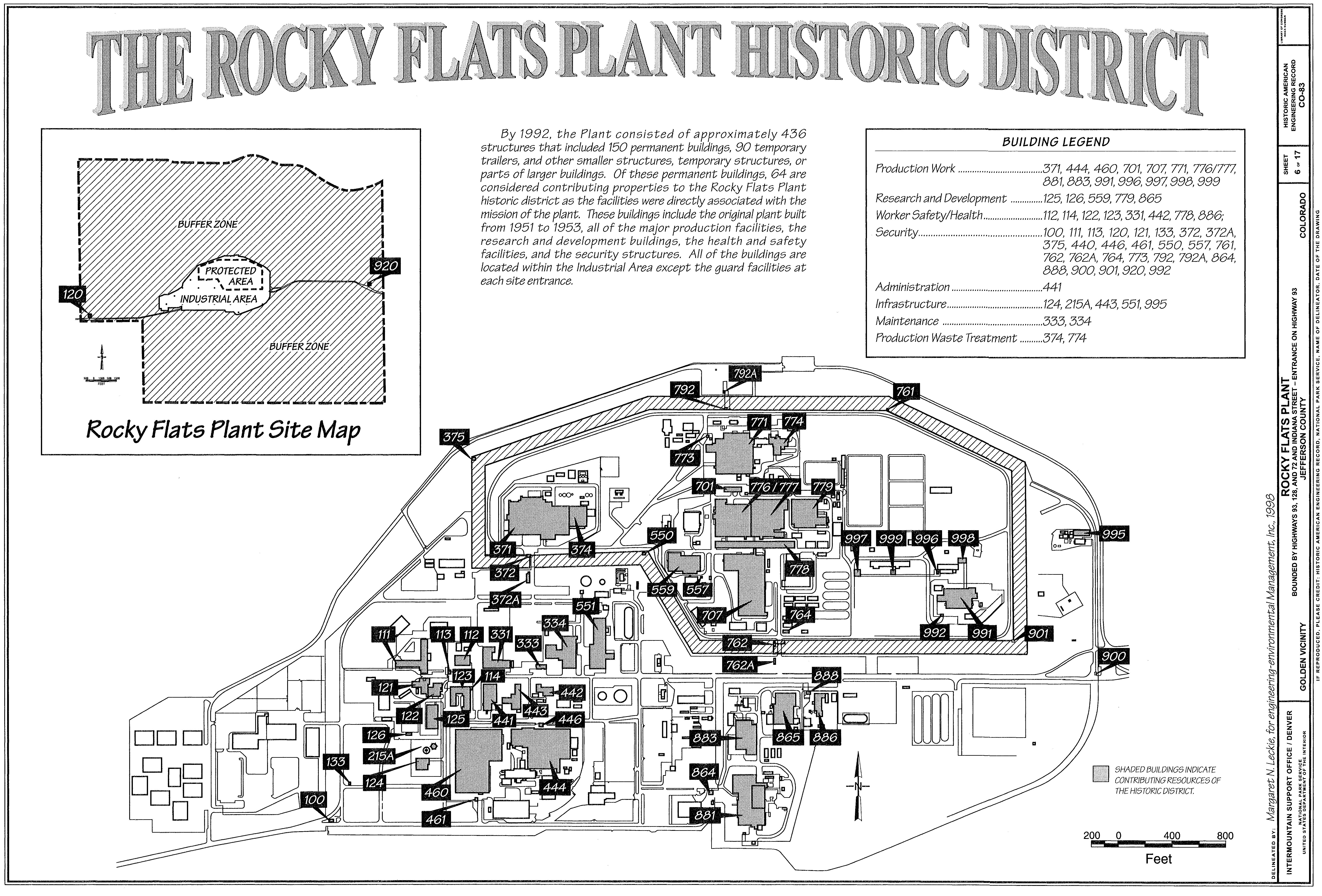

In 1992, due to an order by President G. H. W. Bush, production of submarine-based missiles using the W88 trigger was discontinued, leading to the layoff of 4,500 employees at the plant; 4,000 others were retained for long-term cleanup of the facility. The Rocky Flats Plant Transition Plan outlined the environmental restoration process. The DOE announced that 61 pounds (28 kg) of plutonium lined the exhaust ductwork in six buildings on the site.

Starting in 1993, weapons-grade plutonium began to be shipped to the Oak Ridge National Laboratory, Los Alamos National Laboratory, and the Savannah River Site.

In 1994 the site was renamed the Rocky Flats Environmental Technology Site, reflecting the changed nature of the site from weapon production to environmental cleanup and restoration. The cleanup effort was contracted to the Kaiser-Hill Company, which proposed the release of 4,100 acres (6.4 sq mi; 16.6 km^{2}) of the buffer zone for public access.

In 1998, the Colorado Department of Public Health and Environment's Cancer Registry conducted an independent study of cancer rates in areas around the Rocky Flats Site. Data showed no pattern of increased cancers tied to Rocky Flats.

Throughout the remainder of the 1990s and into the 2000s, cleanup of contaminated sites and dismantling of contaminated buildings continued with the waste materials being shipped to the Nevada Test Site, the Waste Isolation Pilot Plant in New Mexico, and the Envirocare company facility in Utah, which is now EnergySolutions.

=== 2000s ===
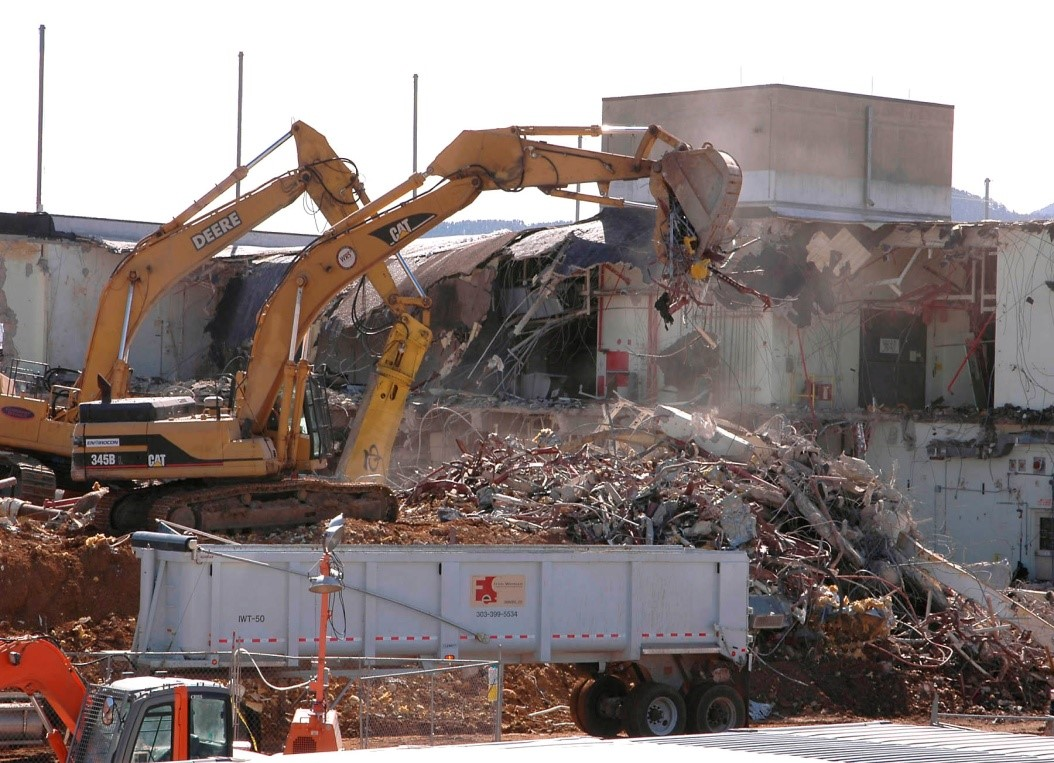
Industrial building demolished at Rocky Flats

In 2001, Congress passed the Rocky Flats National Wildlife Refuge Act. In July 2007, the U.S. Department of Energy transferred nearly 4,000 acres (6 sq mi; 16 km^{2}) of land on the Rocky Flats site to the U.S. Fish and Wildlife Service to establish the Rocky Flats National Wildlife Refuge. Surveys of the site reveal 630 species of vascular plants, 76% of which are native. Herds of elk are commonly seen on the site. However, the DOE retained the central area of the site, the Central Operable Unit.

The last contaminated building was removed and the last weapons-grade plutonium was shipped out in 2003, ending the cleanup based on a modified cleanup agreement. The modified agreement required a higher level of cleanup in the first 3 feet (0.9 m) of soil in exchange for not having to remove any contamination below that point unless it posed a chance of migrating to the surface or contaminating the groundwater. About half of the 800 buildings previously existing on the site had been dismantled by early December 2004. By 2006, over 800 buildings had been decommissioned and demolished, with no buildings remaining. Today, the plant and all buildings are gone.

The site is contaminated with residual plutonium due to several industrial fires that occurred on the site and other inadvertent releases caused by wind at a waste storage area. The other major contaminant is carbon tetrachloride (CCl_{4}). Both of these substances affected areas adjacent to the site. In addition, there were small releases of beryllium and tritium, as well as dioxin from incineration.

Cleanup was declared complete on October 13, 2005. About 1,300 acres (2 sq mi; 5 km^{2}) of the original site, the former industrial area, remains under U.S. DOE Office of Legacy Management control for ongoing environmental monitoring and remediation. On March 14, 2007, DOE, EPA, and CDPHE entered into the Rocky Flats Legacy Management Agreement (RFLMA). The agreement establishes the regulatory framework for implementing the final remedy for the Rocky Flats site and ensuring the protection of human health and the environment.

In 2007, because the Peripheral Operable Unit was found to be suitable for unlimited use and unrestricted exposure, EPA posted public notice of its intent to delete this area (now largely the Rocky Flats National Wildlife Refuge) from the EPA's National Priorities List of CERCLA or "Superfund" sites. The Peripheral Operable Unit was subsequently removed from the National Priorities List.

=== 2010s ===
In September 2010, after a 20-year legal battle, the Tenth Circuit Court of Appeals reversed a $926 million award in a class-action lawsuit against Dow Chemical and Rockwell International. The three-judge panel said that the jury reached its decision on faulty instructions that incorrectly stated the law. The appeals court tossed the jury verdict and sent the case back to the District Court. According to the Appellate Court, the owners of 12,000 properties in the class-action area had not proved their properties were damaged or that they suffered bodily injury from plutonium that blew onto their properties.

In response to historic and ongoing reports of health issues by people who live and lived near Rocky Flats, an online health survey was launched in May 2016 by Metropolitan State University, Rocky Flats Downwinders, and other local universities and health agencies to survey thousands of Coloradans who lived east of the Rocky Flats plant while it was operational.

On May 19, 2016, a $375 million settlement was reached over claims by more than 15,000 nearby homeowners that plutonium releases from the plant risked their health and devalued their property. This settlement ended a 26-year legal battle between residents and the two corporations that ran the Rocky Flats Plant, Dow Chemical and Rockwell International, for the Department of Energy.

June 2014 marked a quarter century since the historic FBI and EPA raid of the Rocky Flats plant. A 3-day weekend of events from Friday, June 6 through Sunday, June 8 took place at the Arvada Center for the Arts, "Rocky Flats Then and Now: 25 Years After the Raid". Panel discussions covered various aspects of the Rocky Flats raid and its aftermath. On display were historical photographs and artifacts, as well as Rocky Flats-inspired art.

In 2016, the Colorado Department of Public Health and Environment's Cancer Registry completed a cancer incidence study that looked at the incidence of reported cancers in areas around Rocky Flats from 1990 to 2014. This study followed-up on and was modeled after CDPHE's original Rocky Flats cancer incidence study, which was completed in 1998. Ten cancers specifically linked to plutonium exposure and other cancers of concern to a Health Advisory Panel were assessed in 1998, and again in 2016. The study found "the incidence of all cancers-combined for both adults and children was no different in the communities surrounding Rocky Flats than would be expected based on cancer rates in the remainder of the Denver Metro area for 1990 to 2014."

In 2017, the CDPHE Cancer Registry completed a supplement to this study that specifically looked at the incidence of thyroid and rare cancers in neighborhoods around Rocky Flats. Cancer incidence data showed "no evidence of higher than expected frequencies of thyroid cancer" and "the incidence of 'rare' cancer was not higher than expected compared to the remainder of the Denver Metro area."

In 2018, Metropolitan State University of Denver declined to further participate in the Downwinders' health survey.

In January 2019, activist groups questioning the contamination risk assessment for the wildlife refuge filed a lawsuit to unseal documents from the grand jury investigation.

In response to concerned citizens reports about a breast cancer cluster in young women, CDPHE's Central Cancer Registry also examined the incidence of breast cancer in young women in communities around Rocky Flats. The Cancer Registry maintains a statewide database of all cancers diagnosed in Colorado residents (with some skin cancer exceptions). Hospitals, physicians, and laboratories are required by law to report medically confirmed cancer data to CDPHE. In October 2019, CDPHE shared the Cancer Registry's findings. The Cancer Registry concluded, based on an analysis of the data, that "no increased incidence of breast cancer was found in young women in communities around Rocky Flats."

== Products ==
Rocky Flats was the primary source for plutonium pits in the United States. These pits were used to make the nuclear weapons. In the 1950s, the company strictly maintained that the workers would handle radioactive material but would not make nuclear weapons. The pits were used at the Pantex plant in Amarillo, Texas to assemble fission weapons and the primary stages of thermonuclear weapons. During its lifetime, the plant manufactured 1,000 to 2,000 pits per year. Los Alamos National Laboratory continued to be used as a pit R&D facility from 1949 to 2013. The Hanford Site also produced plutonium pits from 1949 to 1965.

In addition to other products, the plant produced parts of the warheads for the LGM-30 Minuteman, UGM-73 Poseidon, Multiple independently targetable reentry vehicle, and LIM-49 Spartan programs. It also disassembled decommissioned warheads to recover the plutonium.

== Labor ==
The labor movement and unions played a significant role in the development and operation of Rocky Flats. From the beginning construction was performed with a semi-unionized work force. A walkout halted construction in 1952. By 1958 there were at least 900 unionized workers at the plant represented by 16 different unions. Union representation grew to 1500 by 1962.

Contract negotiations in 1962 ended after President Kennedy asked the Metal Trades Council to postpone a strike and the union agreed. The contract, involving scheduled 2.5% raises, had been proposed by federal negotiators but Dow did not accept. After the postponement, President Kennedy and Secretary of Labor Arthur Goldberg tried to forge an agreement between Dow and the union. However, Dow continued to push contracts allowing seven consecutive days of work which the union rejected and elected to strike.

After the 1969 fire there was significant pressure to keep production going. However, the Sheet Metal Workers Local union had a dispute with the prime contractor, Swinerton and Walbert Co, because their work creating baffles was reassigned to the carpenter's union. This led to a small strike which escalated to the whole Sheet Metal Workers Local striking when the original strikers were fired. Swinerton and Walbert then brought a case before the National Joint Board for Settlement of Jurisdictional Disputes in the Building and Construction Industry. Representatives of the unions in Washington DC went to mediation, but the Sheet Metal Workers Local rejected their resolution requiring them to return to work without the baffle manufacturing job.

Joseph Sykes, a janitor at the plant, was denied unemployment compensation in 1970 after he was fired for refusing to work in buildings 776/777 where the 1969 fire occurred. He felt that it was unsafe to work due to cancer risk, but the Colorado Industrial Commission ruled that he must demonstrate an actual hazard. Witnesses during the case testified that employees at Rocky Flats had received twelve times the federal limit for radiation and twenty times the federal limit for inhaled radiation.

By 1970, the Allied and Technical Workers of the United States and Canada represented 2,000 employees at Rocky Flats. Their wage negotiations fell through and resulted in a strike when the union demanded a 15% raise and the company would not go above 7%. Shortly afterwards, their picket line was mandated by the federal court to use no more than two pickets and twenty-four persons. This was increased a few days later to allow seven pickets and thirty-two persons. The union did not follow the order; hundreds of workers picketed and spread nails on the plant's approach roads. The strike continued for more than eight weeks with 120 scabs. Dow filed charges with the National Labor Relations Board against the union claiming they negotiated in bad faith and intimidated scabs.

In the early 1970s the AEC continued to seek additional funding from congress to upgrade Rocky Flats. Along with the new funding, the AEC recommended Dow Chemical install safety upgrades, but the company did not want to implement these systems. When their contract with United Steel Workers of America expired, in 1973, the union rejected a 7% raise because they wanted Dow to agree to follow the AEC's safety recommendations.

By 1986 over 5,500 workers were employed at the site, and were represented by the Oil, Chemical and Atomic Workers International Union (OCAW).

== Protests ==
The Rocky Flats Truth Force was formed in April 1978 to protest plutonium production, secrecy, and unsafe conditions at Rocky Flats during the late 1970s. They conducted a series of peaceful protests through 1983 which were designed to disrupt Rocky Flats operations by blocking roads and railroads with their bodies. Demonstrations and track blockages at the Rocky Flats Plant in 1978 resulted in multiple arrests of the protesters. Some of the people involved in the Truth Force movement formed the Boulder Peace Center, later the Rocky Mountain Peace Center and then the current name - the Rocky Mountain Peace and Justice Center.

During the final weekend of April 1979, a few weeks after the Three Mile Island accident, ten thousand protesters assembled at a nearby site. Whistleblower Daniel Ellsberg, known for his leak of the Pentagon Papers, was arrested alongside 285 others for civil disobedience/trespassing on the Rocky Flats facility. Singers Jackson Browne and Bonnie Raitt performed for the protest. The protest repeated with fifteen thousand people the following year, when Peter Yarrow, took the stage along with various speakers. John B. Anderson and Ted Kennedy provided bipartisan support for the protest. In a different protest, twenty-three were arrested on the campus of University of Colorado Boulder for disrupting Rockwell's interview process with CU students.

On December 11, 1980, Congress enacted the Comprehensive Environmental Response, Compensation, and Liability Act, which provided the authority to respond directly to releases or threatened releases at the nation's worst environmental sites.

Dark Circle is a 1982 American documentary film that focuses on the Rocky Flats Plant and its plutonium contamination of the area's environment. The film won the Grand Prize for documentary at the Sundance Film Festival and received a national Emmy Award for "Outstanding individual achievement in news and documentary".

Rocky Flats became a focus of protest by peace activists throughout the 1980s. In 1983, a demonstration was organized that brought together 17,000 people who joined hands in an encirclement around the 17-mile (27 km) perimeter of the plant.

On August 10, 1987, 320 demonstrators were arrested after they tried to force a one-day shutdown of the Rocky Flats nuclear weapons plant. In August 1989, an estimated 3,500 people turned out for a demonstration at Rocky Flats.

== See also ==
- Atomic Energy Act
- Cold War
- Manhattan Project
- Price-Anderson Act
- Radioactive contamination from the Rocky Flats Plant
- Timeline of nuclear weapons development
