= Patricia A. Gabow =

American physician, researcher, healthcare executive, author and lecturer (b. 1944)

- Born: Patricia Anne Acquaviva; January 1944 (age 80–81)
- Education: B.S.Seton Hill College, 1965; M.D., University of Pennsylvania School of Medicine, 1969
- Occupation(s): Academic Physician, Medical Director, Denver Healh CEO
- Years active: 1973–2012
- Organization(s): Denver Health & Hospital Authority, University of Colorado School of Medicine
- Known for: Model safety net healthcare system
- Spouse: Harold N. Gabow (m. 1971)
- Children: 2
- Honours: Colorado Women's Hall of Fame, 2004

Patricia Anne Gabow (née Acquaviva; born January 1944) is an American academic physician, medical researcher, healthcare executive, author and lecturer. Specializing in nephrology, she joined the department of medicine, division of renal diseases, at the University of Colorado School of Medicine in 1973, advancing to a full professorship in 1987; she is presently Professor Emerita. She was the principal investigator on the National Institutes of Health Human Polycystic Kidney Disease research grant, which ran from 1985 to 1999, and defined the clinical manifestations and genetics of the disease in adults and children.

She served for two decades as CEO of Denver Health, an integrated public healthcare system in Denver, Colorado, where she implemented numerous business-based systems to streamline operations, improve patient care, and realize cost savings. In particular, her introduction of the "Lean" quality-improvement system, based on the Toyota Production System, earned her national recognition. She is the author of more than 150 articles and book chapters, four books, and has received numerous awards for excellence in teaching, physician care, and leadership. She was inducted into the Colorado Women's Hall of Fame in 2004.

== Early life and education ==
Patricia Anne Acquaviva was born in 1944 to an Italian-American family. Her parents, Patrick Acquaviva and Terese Colonna Acquaviva, married in 1942. Her father, a private first class in the US army, was killed in action in March 1945 during the Allied advance from Paris to the Rhine, after which she and her mother moved in with her uncle and grandparents. Her mother, a teacher, remarried to James R. Helmintoller in 1951.

She earned her B.S. in biology at Seton Hill College in 1965. She received her M.D. at the University of Pennsylvania School of Medicine in 1969.

== Academic career ==
After interning in medicine for one year at the Hospital of the University of Pennsylvania, she undertook a one-year residency in internal medicine at Harbor General Hospital in 1970. This was followed by one-year renal fellowships at San Francisco General Hospital and the Hospital of the University of Pennsylvania. In 1973, she joined Denver Health and Hospitals to establish its nephrology department. She began as an instructor in the Division of Renal Diseases at the University of Colorado, advancing to a full professorship in 1987.

== Health administrator ==
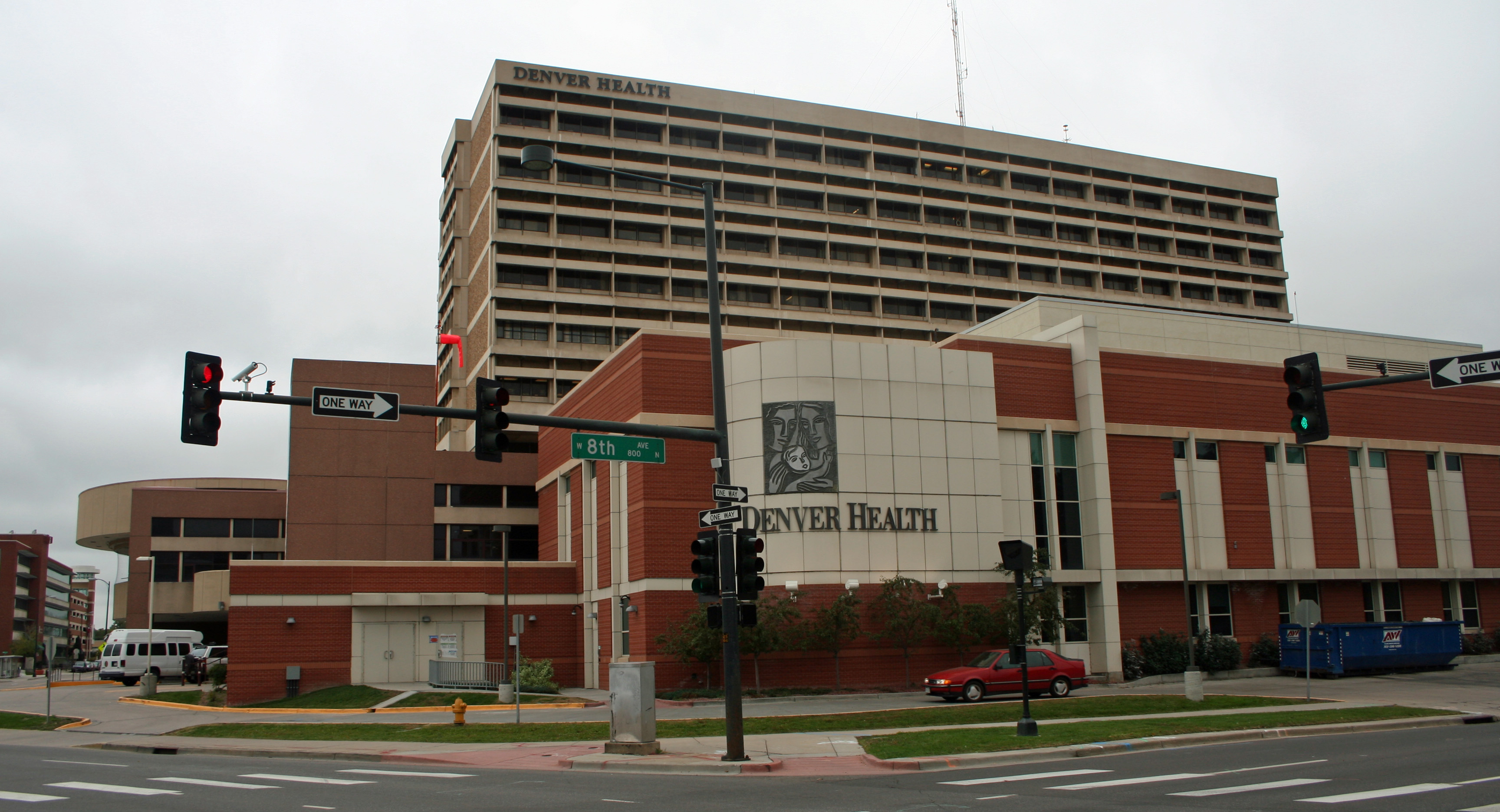
Denver Health campus

Gabow served as Chief of Renal Disease for Denver Health and Hospitals, a city charter department, from 1973 to 1981. In 1976 she was appointed Clinical Director of the department of medicine for Denver Health, also serving in this position until 1981. In 1981 she was appointed Director of Medical Services for Denver Health, serving in this position for a decade. Gabow was named Deputy Manager of Medical Affairs (CMO) for Denver Health in 1989, and was appointed as CEO and Medical Director in 1992. After the creation of an independent state health authority called Denver Health and Hospitals Authority (DHHA) in 1997, Gabow served as CEO and Medical Director of DHHA from 1997 to 2008, and as CEO of DHHA from 2008 to 2012.

Under Gabow's leadership, the Denver Health system changed from a department of city government to an independent governmental entity achieving flexibility, issuing debt, and financial stability. She also introduced a number of business-based improvement systems to streamline operations, improve employee satisfaction and patient care. Most notable was the "Lean" quality-improvement system based on the Toyota Production System, introduced in 2005. Lean management cuts waste and streamlines processes using employee teams, and without restricting access to healthcare by uninsured patients or making staff layoffs

In 2014 Gabow published a book on the use of the Lean system at Denver Health, entitled The Lean Prescription: Powerful Medicine for Our Ailing Healthcare System. She and coauthor Philip L. Goodman received the 2015 Shingo Research and Professional Publication Award for the book, while Denver Health itself received the Shingo Bronze Medallion.

During Gabow's tenure, Denver Health invested more than $400 million in IT, modernized the physical plant, expanded the community health and school based clinics, and developed a Medicaid managed product. In 2011, the healthcare system achieved the lowest medical mortality rate among 114 academic medical centers in the University HealthCare Consortium. Gabow retired from Denver Health in September 2012. Donna Lynne, Dr.P. H. has been the CEO of Denver Health since 2022.

== Research ==
Early in her career, Gabow specialized in nephrology with a focus on polycystic kidney disease. She was the principal investigator on the National Institutes of Health Human Polycystic Kidney Disease research grant, which ran from 1985 to 1999. She was also the principal investigator on the Community Voices: Health Care for the Underserved, a $5 million research grant funded by the W. K. Kellogg Foundation/Colorado Trust, from 1997 to 2007, and led other studies for the Agency for Healthcare Research and Quality. Gabow has published more than 150 research papers and book chapters, and four books.

== Representative publications ==
Gabow PA, Anderson RJ, Potts DE, Schrier RW. Acid-base disturbances in the salicylate-intoxicated adult. Arch Intern Med 138:1481, 1978.

Gabow PA, Kaehny WD, Fennessey PV, Goodman SI, Gross PA, Schrier RW. Diagnostic importance of an increased serum anion gap. N Engl J Med 303:854‑858, 1980.

Gabow PA, Kaehny WD, Kelleher S. The spectrum of rhabdomyolysis. Medicine 61:141‑152, 1982.

Gabow PA, Ikle DW, Holmes JH. Polycystic kidney disease: Prospective analysis of nonazotemic patients and family members. Ann Intern Med 101:238‑247, 1984.

Sedman A, Bell P, Manco-Johnson M, Schrier R, Warady BA, Heard EO, Butler- Simon N, Gabow PA. Autosomal dominant polycystic kidney disease in childhood: A longitudinal study. Kidney Int 31:1000-1005, 1987.

Kimberling WJ, Fain PR, Kenyon JB, Goldgar D, Sujansky E, Gabow PA. Linkage heterogeneity of autosomal dominant polycystic kidney disease. N Engl J Med 319:913-918, 1988

Gabow PA, Johnson AM, Kaehny WD, Kimberling WJ, Lezotte DC, Duley IT, Jones RH. Factors affecting the progression of renal disease in autosomal dominant polycystic kidney disease. Kidney Int 41:1311-1319, 1992.

Gabow PA, Eisert S, Wright RA. Denver Health: A Model for an Integration of a Public Hospital and Community Health Centers. Ann Intern Med. 138:143-149, 2003.

Gabow, Patricia A. and Mehler, Philip S. A Broad and Structured Approach to Improving Patient Safety and Quality: Lessons from Denver Health. Health Affairs. 30 (4): 612-618, 2011.

Gabow, Patricia A. and Smith, Mark. Separate or United: The Safety Net in the Era of Health Care Integration: Journal of Healthcare for the Poor and Underserved. 28(3): 853-859, 2017.

Gabow, Patricia A. and Matthew Wynia. Oaths, Conscience, Contracts, and Laws---The Gathering Storm Confronting Medical Professionalism. JAMA. 332:615-616, 2024.

Gabow, Patricia A. Time's Now for Women Healthcare Leaders: A Guide for the Journey. Productivity Press, 2020.

Gabow, Patricia A. The Catholic Church and Its Hospitals: A Marriage Made in Heaven?. American Association for Physician Leadership Inc, 2023.

== Memberships ==
Gabow is a Master of the American College of Physicians. She has been a member of the Medicaid and CHIP Payment and Access Commission, the Robert Wood Johnson Foundation board, and the Health Advisory Committee of the National Governors' Association. She serves on the Lown Institute Board, starting in 2017, and has been Chair since 2021. She served on the board of trustees of her alma mater, Seton Hill University, from 2015-2018.

== Selected awards and honors ==
Gabow is the recipient of numerous awards recognizing excellence in teaching and physician care, including the 1998 A.N. Richards Distinguished Achievement Award in Nephrology from the University of Pennsylvania School of Medicine, the 2000 Florence Rena Sabin Award from the University of Colorado Health Sciences Center, the 2000 Nathan Davis Award for Career Public Servant at the Local Level from the American Medical Association, Washington, D.C., the Ohtli Award from the Mexican government in 2004, the National Center for Healthcare Leadership Award for lifetime achievement in 2008, the Health Quality Award from the National Committee for Quality Assurance in 2012, the David E. Rogers Award from the Association of American Medical Colleges in 2010, and the National Academy of Medicine Gustav O. Lienhard Award in 2019. She was named one of the "50 Most Powerful Physician Executives in Health Care" by Modern Healthcare magazine in 2007 and 2009. She was named a Master of the American College of Physicians in 2009.

For her implementation of the Lean quality-improvement system in the healthcare industry, she was awarded the "Innovator in Health" award by the New England Healthcare Institute in 2010 and was inducted into the Association for Manufacturing Excellence Hall of Fame.

Gabow has been recognized as a leading woman physician and role model by numerous organizations. She received the National Board of the Medical College of Pennsylvania Annual Award to an Outstanding Woman Physician in 1982, the Women of Distinction Award from the Mile Hi Council of Girl Scouts in 1998, and the Outstanding Women in Business award from the Denver Business Journal in 2005. The International Women's Forum and Colorado Women's Forum honored her as one of the Women Who Make a Difference in 2005, and the Women's Foundation of Colorado named her a Unique Woman of Colorado in 2007. She was inducted into the Colorado Women's Hall of Fame in 2004.

Gabow received an honorary doctorate in science from the University of Colorado in 2009 and an honorary doctorate of public service from the University of Denver in 2010.

== Personal life ==
In June 1971 she married Harold N. Gabow, a computer scientist. The couple have two children.
