= Saltcrete =

Mixture of cement with salts and brine

Saltcrete is a mixture of cement with salts and brine, usually originating from liquid waste treatment plants. Its role is to immobilize hazardous waste and in some cases lower-level radioactive waste in the form of solid material. It is a form of mixed waste.

Saltcrete is being replaced by saltstone, which is less permeable and leachable. Saltstone is a mixture of the salt cake (mostly sodium nitrate and other salts) with concrete and fly ash.

An example of a saltcrete site in the United States is The Rocky Flats Environmental Technology Site (RFETS) near Denver, Colorado. Between 1952 and 1992, nuclear weapons components consisting of radioactive and otherwise hazardous materials were manufactured there. By 1989, a government investigation had concluded that many of these materials were being improperly stored and handled, leading to the site being added to the National Priorities List for cleanup by the Environmental Protection Agency.

== Saltcrete-related background of RFETS ==
In June 1997 Kaiser-Hill Company, also known as CH2M Hill, the DOE Integrating Management Contractor for RFETS, contracted with Envirocare of Utah, Inc., also known as EnergySolutions, to transport, treat and dispose of more than 13,000 cubic meters of radioactively and hazardously contaminated mixed waste, including the Saltcrete waste stream. Shipment of Saltcrete began in July 1997. The first phase of 1,705 cubic meters of the Saltcrete waste stream was successfully transported, treated and disposed in less than eight weeks. The second phase of 1,710 cubic meters was completed in the first quarter of FY98 in the same amount of time.

== Introduction ==
Saltcrete is the result and technique of wastewater processing and was the second-largest mixed waste stream at RFETS requiring treatment and disposition. The majority of wastewater from RFETS production processes is contained in large tanks and then is treated by precipitation, filtration, evaporation, and drying to result in a matrix referred to as "salts". Original waste stream production was rich in nitrates and sulfates, therefore the reference to the dried material as salts; however, current waste stream production has an essentially decreased concentration of inorganic compounds, even though the waste is still considered to as salts. Saltcrete is formed when liquid evaporator concentrates are combined with the salts and Portland cement. The mixture is poured into cardboard and plywood containers to solidify into a monolith.

The process waste water remains hazardous waste Saltcrete is a mixed radioactive waste. Radionuclide contamination principally includes americium, plutonium, and uranium. The waste carries Resource Conservation and Recovery Act, RCRA, Hazardous Waste Codes F001, F002, F005, F006, F007, and F009. RCRA contaminants include specific volatile and semi-volatile organic compounds and metals.

== Treatment and formula development by the joint-venture ==
The mutual goal between Envirocare and Kaiser-Hill was to meet the Rocky Flats Cleanup Agreement. The agreement policy was 1,575 cubic meters of non-compliant Saltcrete waste had to be removed from RFETS by September 30, 1997. After agreement award yet prior to shipment to Envirocare, a successful formula had to be developed in time to meet the specified objectives.

Benchscale treatability studies were in progress by experimenting five ‘worst-case’ samples of the Saltcrete waste that were collected by Kaiser-Hill. According to the variability of RCRA Hazardous Waste constituents in the waste population, several treatability samples were required. This sample selection was required to make sure that the formula developed would be sufficiently aggressive to stabilize the hazardous elements known to be existed. Formula development services were subcontracted by Envirocare to InSciTe (a subsidiary of Mountain States Analytical Laboratory, Inc.). Formula development was involving the application of several combinations of chemical reagents in an effort to immobilize hazardous constituents. In accordance with existing permit requirements, Envirocare submitted a copy of the Treatment Formula to the State of Utah, Division of Solid and Hazardous Waste. The State retains this report for its reference.

Kaiser-Hill was successful in expediting sample selection, collection and delivery to Envirocare for the analysis. Envirocare utilized rush analytical services and an accelerated schedule for result in the formula being developed in under one month. Notification for shipment was provided to Kaiser-Hill immediately upon successful formula development. Finally in 1997, Envirocare has won a $7 million contract to handle low-level mixed waste at the former Rocky Flats nuclear weapons plant.

== Site condition criteria ==
The site-related criteria are used for development of the design for the temporary Reprocessing Facility are also provided in the Process and Project Design Criteria. Numerous of the rules, regulations, guidelines, policies, etc. for a sub-contractor operated, temporary facility have a different principle than those which could be an impact or requirement for a longer-term facility. Furthermore, standards for a processing facility which could be adjusted for a higher variation of feed materials and possibly have the ability to emit different byproduct waste forms such as liquid to solid, are also seemed to be integrated. These new regulations would have to be determined and the well-fitted modifications made to the equipment design criteria, general design criteria, specifications and site-related considerations. These differences would then have to be acknowledged into the construction design. It is similarly that the site-related criteria required for the longer-term plant will not only require a more detailed engineering effort for process design, but also would require greater attention to definition of the site-related factors such as soil bearing pressure, requirements for foundations, vibrational considerations, building criteria, etc.

== Disposal of Saltcrete ==
Treated byproduct will be placed mixed waste cell for permanent disposition. The mixed waste cell is engineered with a triple high-density polyethylene (HDPE) liner system. Collected layers between each line provide leak liquid management and leakage detection for the cell, while a foundation of engineered clay stabilizes the liner system. The waste is buried in a 7 ft clay radon barrier, a rock filter zone, and a coarse rock erosion barrier.

== See also ==
- Pondcrete – Radioactive waste mixture
- Salt-concrete – Construction material used to reduce water inflow in radioactive waste repositories in salt rock
