= Pondcrete =

Radioactive waste mixture

Pondcrete is a mixture of cement and sludge. Its role is to immobilize hazardous waste and, in some cases, low-level and mixed-level radioactive waste, in the form of solid material. The material was used by the United States Department of Energy and its contractor, Rockwell International, in an attempt to handle the radioactive waste from contaminated ponds in the Rocky Flats Plant for burial in Nevada desert. Portland cement is mixed with sludge to solidify into “pondcrete” blocks and placed into large, plastic lined boxes. The sludge is taken from solar evaporation ponds which are used to remove moisture from waste materials, therefore reducing their weight. To do this, liquid waste is poured into artificial, shallow ponds. The waste is heated by solar radiation and any moisture is evaporated, leaving behind the waste. These ponds contained low level radioactive process waste as well as sanitary sewage sludge and wastes, which categorize them and the Pondcrete as a mixed waste.

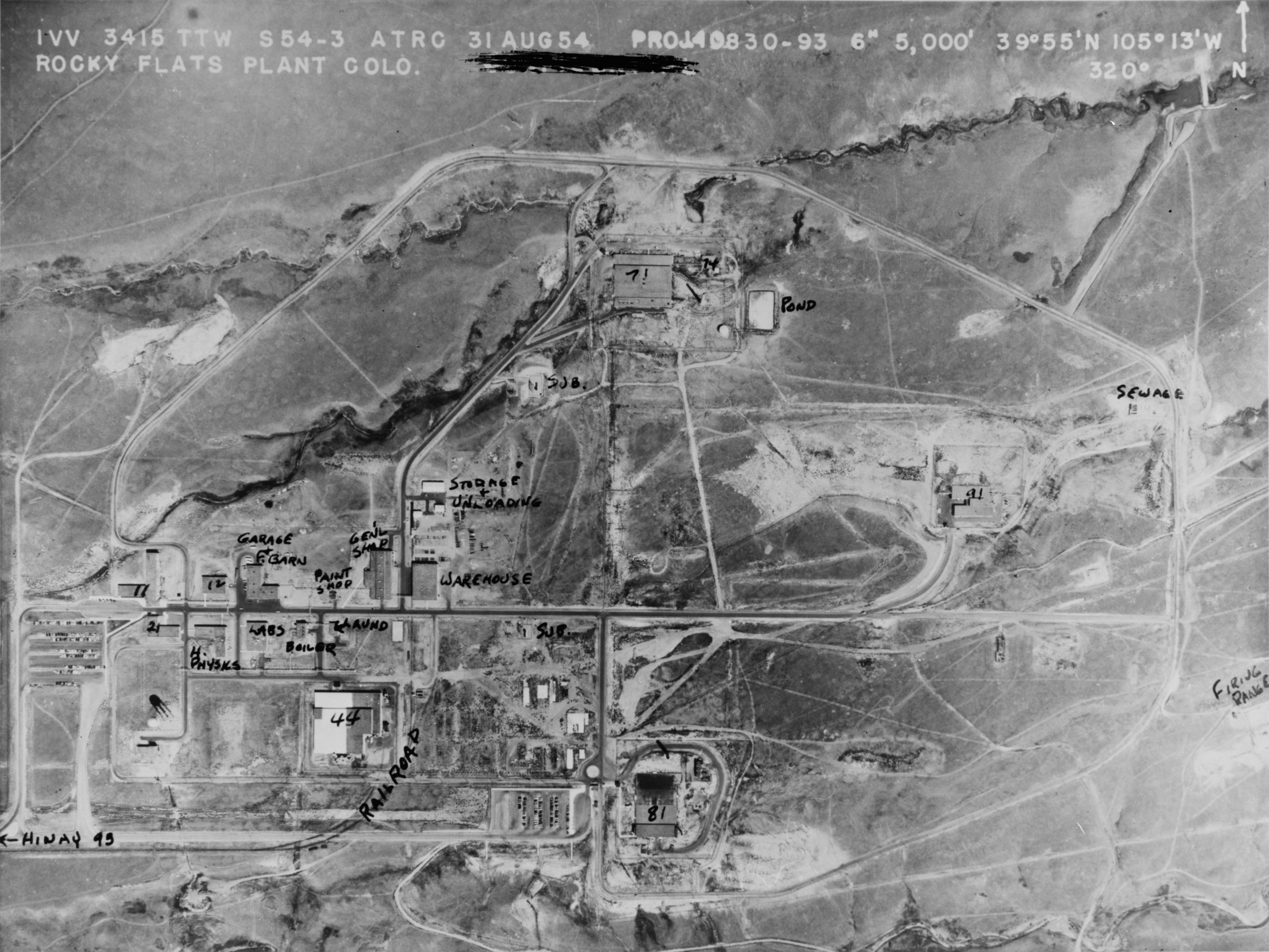
Rocky Flats Plant - Aerial View 002

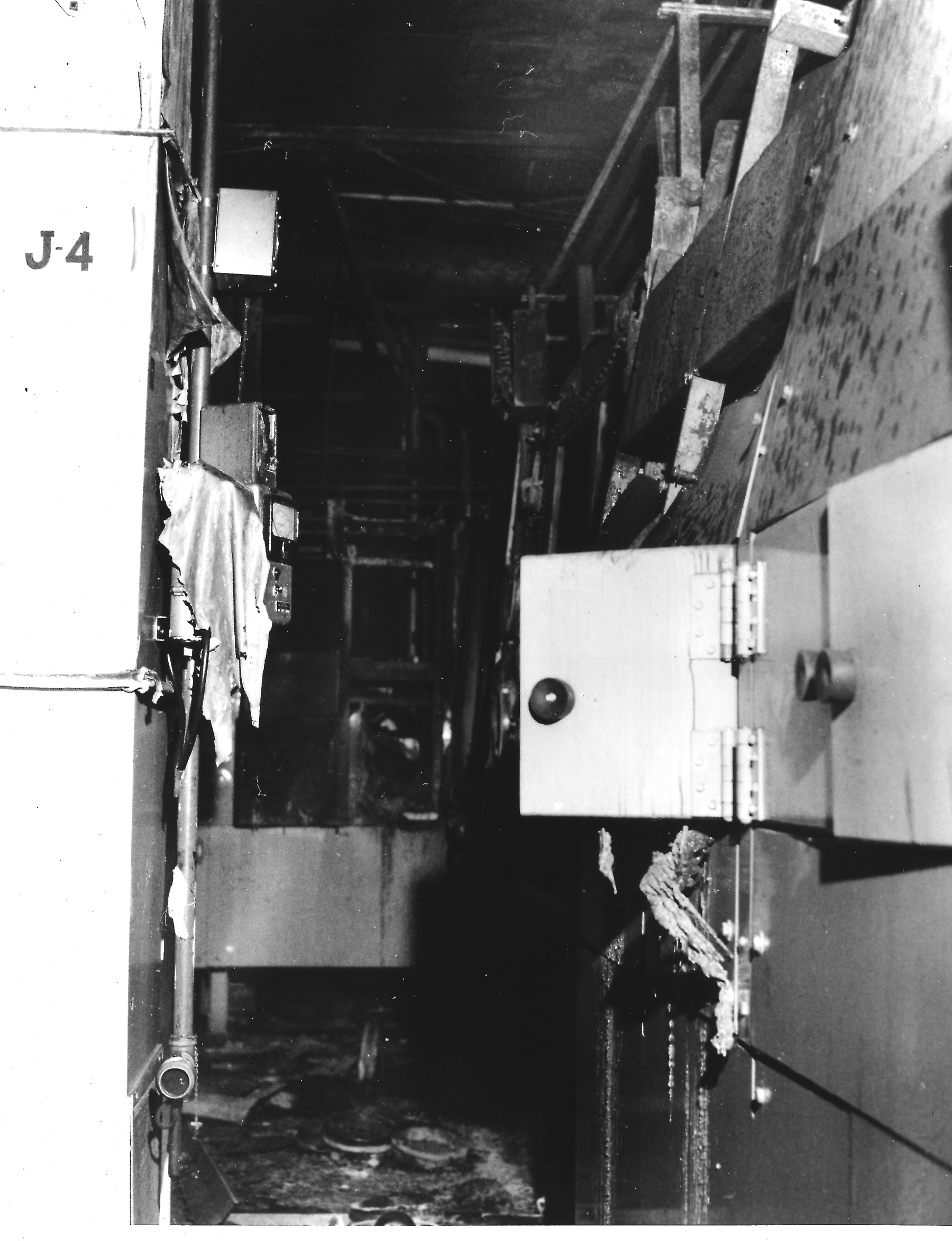
Room damaged by 1969 Rocky Flats Fire

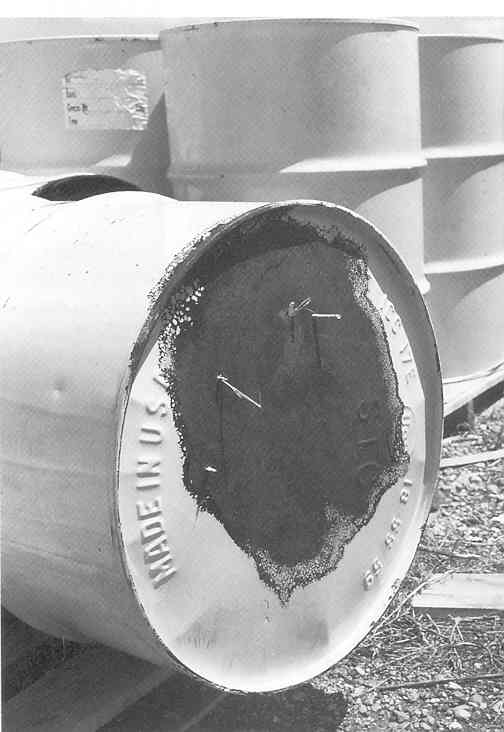
Leaking drum from pad 903

== Radioactive waste ==
Because the blocks were classified as mixed-level radioactive waste, including plutonium, Rockwell International was unable to store the blocks in the Nevada Test site. The Nevada Test Site did not have a permit to store mixed-level radioactive waste, so the blocks were left in temporary storage at Rocky Flats. Due to problems in production, many of the blocks did not harden correctly and eventually began to seep from the boxes causing large scale environmental contamination of the area. The blocks containing plutonium-239, radioactive waste with a half-life of 24,100 years, had failed in a year. Despite warnings by engineer Jim Stone that the blocks would most likely fail earlier than expected, the blocks were still produced. Later it would be Jim Stone who would file a lawsuit against the company, claiming that they had concealed environmental, safety and health problems from the United States Department of Energy.

== Investigation ==
The contaminations led to an investigation of the Plant by the Federal Bureau of Investigation and the Environmental Protection Agency which eventually resulted in its shutdown. In 1989, Federal Judge Sherman Finesilver, approved the release of the Colorado Federal District Court Special Grand Jury Report on the investigation. The report found that the Department of Energy and the Environmental Protection Agency oversight were not performed adequately to protect the environment, and that Rockwell did not comply with environmental laws at the Rocky Flats Plant. The United States Department of Energy (DOE) and Rockwell violated the Resource Conservation and Recovery Act (RCRA) by illegally storing, treating and disposing of residues in more than 17,000 blocks of pondcrete and saltcrete in plastic lined cardboard containers outdoors on the 904 Pad at the plant. Each pondcrete block containing mixed-wastes (radionuclides, cadmium, methylene chloride and acetone) weighed between 1,500 and 1,800 pounds. These blocks did not sufficiently harden like concrete, maintaining a consistency of wet clay. Many of the boxes ruptured, possibly due to extreme temperature fluctuations in that region of Colorado, spilling these wastes onto the asphalt pad at Site 904. Rain and wind carried these wastes into drainage areas and into the air and soil.

== See also ==
- Saltcrete – Mixture of cement with salts and brine
- Rocky Flats Plant – Defunct American nuclear weapons manufacturing site in Colorado
- Radioactive waste – Unusable radioactive materials
- Radioactive contamination from the Rocky Flats Plant – Environmental contamination by nuclear weapons production
