= Denver Department of Public Health & Environment =

The Denver Department of Public Health & Environment (DDPHE) is a charter-established department of the City & County of Denver, Colorado. It is the city's nationally accredited public health agency. DEH includes five divisions: Animal Protection and the Denver Animal Shelter (DAS), Community Health & Decision Support (CHDS), Environmental Quality (EQ), Public Health Inspections (PHI), and The Office of the Medical Examiner (OME).

== History ==
In 1990, the board of Denver Department of Health & Hospitals, then a city department, concluded and recommended to then Mayor Pena that the Coroner's Office (now known as the Office of the Medical Examiner in Environmental Health) be removed from the Denver Department of Health & Hospitals due to conflict of interest in the Coroner's duty to investigate suspicious deaths that occur in hospital settings. Since the Department of Health & Hospitals included Denver General Hospital, the board concluded that the Coroner's Office should be run as a "medical examiner system" separate from Denver General Hospital, and should meet the National Association of Medical Examiner's accreditation standards and be run by a Chief Forensic Pathologist.

In 1997, the Department of Health and Hospitals, a city charter department within the City & County of Denver, separated from the city to become Denver Health & Hospital Authority (DHHA). DHHA was created under State statute as an independent State Authority, run by a board of directors appointed by the Mayor. No longer a department under the city with city authority, the statute provides that as an independent authority "the city shall have no further control over the operations of the health system.”

Reason for separation: Among others,

1. Allow Denver Health to be free of Denver's personnel and procurement system to enable DHHA to compete more effectively with other health care providers.
2. As an independent entity, DHHA would be better able to raise charitable contributions and to compete with other hospitals for private-pay patients

The Denver Department of Environmental Health (DEH) was established to replace the Department of Health and Hospitals to be city's neutral and publicly accountable, public health agency. While DHHA maintained the medical service functions, DEH was established to administer and exercise control over all City programs and functions pertaining to public, mental and environmental health of the public and to enforce related City rules and regulations. DEH retains city charter authority and responsibilities, except the hospital and medical care functions. This authority includes:

- Appointing the County Coroner
- Preparing and administering the department's budget and being accountable to taxpayers (public as part of the Colorado Open Records Records Act), which includes payment for some of DHHA's health and medical services
- Exercise governmental powers including rulemaking, issuance and enforcement of public health orders including isolation and quarantine orders. This includes issuing fines and orders to comply in regulated food service facilities (restaurants, grocery stores, school cafeterias), Animal Care & Control violations (failure to spay or neuter, vaccinate, license, etc.), violations of the city's air quality, land and water quality-related ordinances.
- Contract with DHHA for health and medical services pursuant to terms and conditions approved by agreement (the "Operating Agreement").
- DEH undertakes its public and environmental health responsibilities through its agencies and partnerships, including DHHA pursuant to the Operating Agreement.
- DEH provides oversight of the Operating Agreement (OA) on behalf of and in coordination with multiple City agencies who receive medical services from DHHA.

== See also ==
- Colorado Department of Public Health & Environment
