= Colorado Department of Public Health and Environment =

Department of the Colorado state government

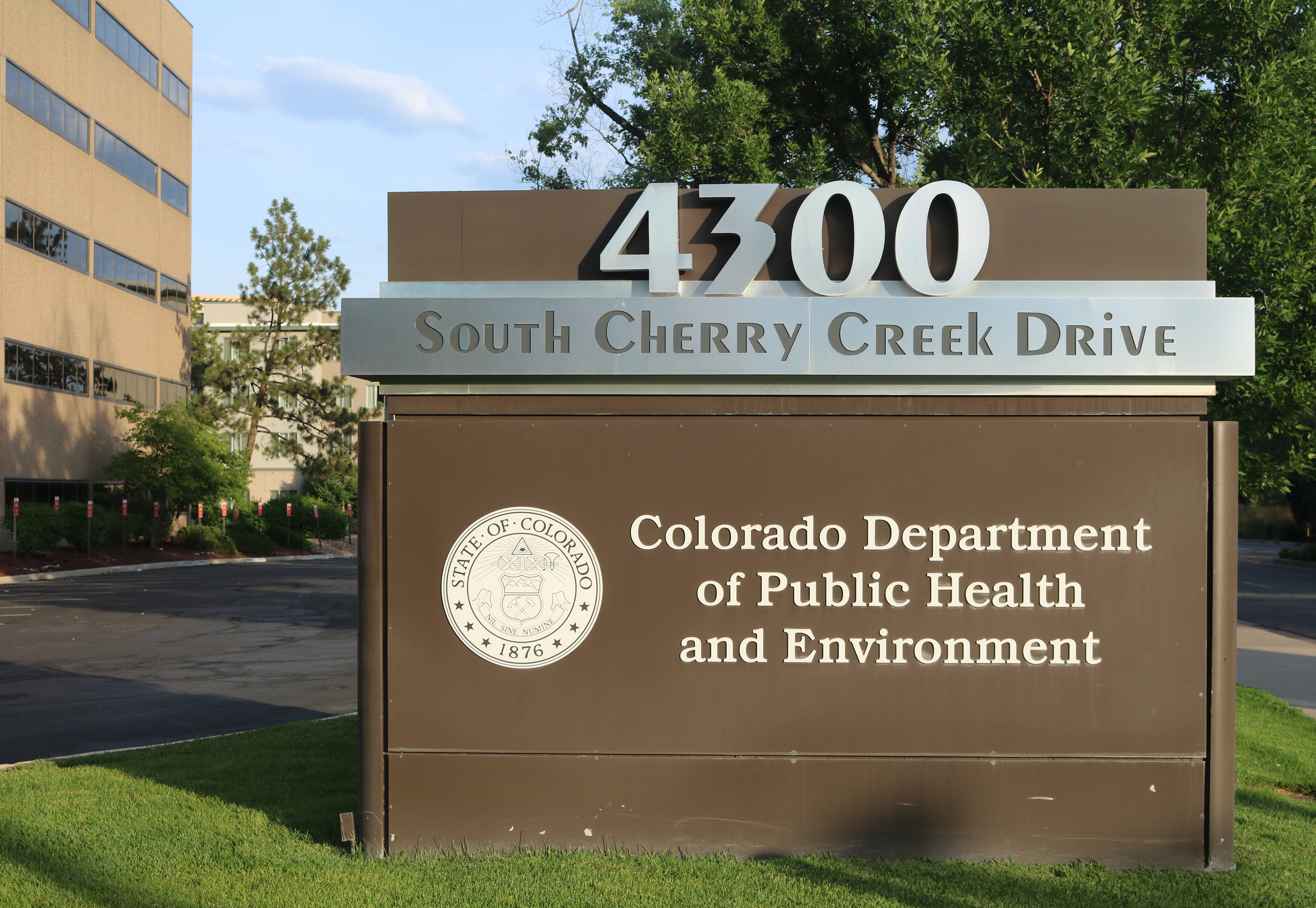
- The department's headquarters (left) in Glendale

Department overview
- Jurisdiction: Colorado
- Headquarters: Glendale, Colorado
- Department executive: Jill Hunsaker Ryan, Executive Director
- Website: cdphe.colorado.gov

The Colorado Department of Public Health and Environment (CDPHE) is the principal department of the Colorado state government responsible for public health and environmental regulation. In addition to environmental issues like pollution and drinking water, the CDPHE also oversees public health issues like chronic disease prevention and management.

== History ==
In 1876, the Territorial Board of Health was created when the Governor John L. Routt, signed legislation into law creating the nine-member board of physicians across the state. Their charter was to investigate public health issues and recommend resolutions. It had an annual budget of $500,000. The president was Dr. Frederick J. Bancroft and the secretary was Harrison A. Lemen. Other physicians on the board were William H. Williams, A.V. Small, Thomas G. Horn, William Edmondson, Russell J. Collins, Timothy M. Smith, and Thomas N. Metcalf.

The Colorado State Board of Health was established on March 22, 1877, with Frederick Bancroft as its president. It had limited responsibility, such as gathering statistics about sewage disposal and water supply. Bancroft also advocated for research into what altitudes were best suited for children's development mentally and physically. Because of their limited role in advocated public health issues, members resigned and waited until the end of their terms to leave their posts. There were no members and the board failed to exist on June 1, 1886.

== See also ==
- Denver Department of Public Health & Environment
