= Radioactive contamination from the Rocky Flats Plant =

Environmental contamination by nuclear weapons production

Coordinates: 39°53′33″N 105°12′14″W

One of four example estimates of the plutonium (Pu-239) plume from the 1957 fire at the Rocky Flats nuclear weapons plant

The Rocky Flats Plant, a former United States nuclear weapons production facility located about 15 miles (24 km) northwest of Denver, Colorado, caused radioactive contamination (primarily from plutonium, americium, and uranium) within and outside its boundaries. The contamination primarily resulted from two major plutonium fires in 1957 and 1969 (plutonium is pyrophoric, and shavings can spontaneously combust) and from wind-blown plutonium that leaked from barrels of radioactive waste. Much lower concentrations of radioactive isotopes were released throughout the operational life of the plant from 1952 to 1992, from smaller accidents and from normal operational releases of plutonium particles too small to be filtered. Prevailing winds from the plant carried airborne contamination south and east, into populated areas northwest of Denver.

The contamination of the Denver area by plutonium from the fires and other sources was not publicly reported until the 1970s. According to a 1972 study coauthored by Edward Martell, "In the more densely populated areas of Denver, the Pu contamination level in surface soils is several times fallout", and the plutonium contamination "just east of the Rocky Flats plant ranges up to hundreds of times that from nuclear tests." As noted by Carl Johnson in Ambio, "Exposures of a large population in the Denver area to plutonium and other radionuclides in the exhaust plumes from the plant date back to 1953."

Weapons production at the plant was halted after a combined FBI and EPA raid in 1989 and years of protests. The plant has since been shut down, with its buildings demolished and completely removed from the site. The Rocky Flats Plant was declared a Superfund site in 1989 and began its transformation to a cleanup site in February 1992. Removal of the plant and surface contamination was largely completed in the late 1990s and early 2000s. Nearly all underground contamination was left in place, and measurable radioactive environmental contamination in and around Rocky Flats will probably persist for thousands of years. The land formerly occupied by the plant is now the Rocky Flats National Wildlife Refuge. Plans to make this refuge accessible for recreation have been repeatedly delayed due to lack of funding and protested by citizen organizations.

The Department of Energy continues to fund monitoring of the site, but private groups and researchers remain concerned about the extent and long-term public health consequences of the contamination. Estimates of the public health risk caused by the contamination vary significantly, with accusations that the United States government is being too secretive and that citizen activists are being alarmist.

== Background ==
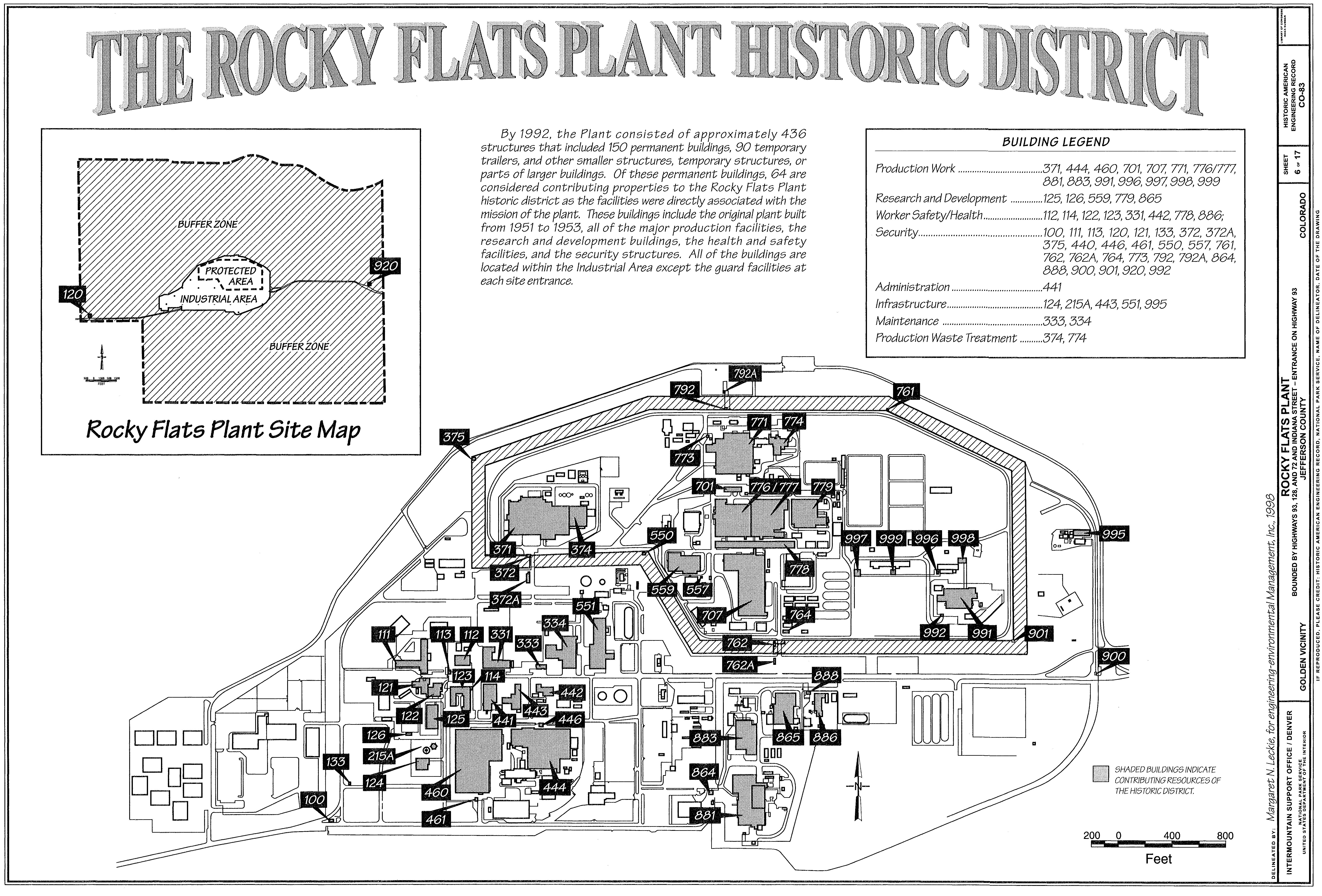
A map of the Rocky Flats Plant before its decommissioning. All buildings have since been demolished.

The Rocky Flats Plant was south of Boulder, Colorado, and northwest of Denver. Originally under the Dow Chemical Company's management, it was transferred to Rockwell in 1975. It initially had an area of 4 sq mi (10 km^{2}); a 4,600 acres (19 km^{2}) buffer zone was added in 1972.

Construction of the first buildings began on July 10, 1951. Production of parts for nuclear weapons began in 1953. At the time, the precise nature of the work at Rocky Flats was a closely guarded secret. The plant produced fission cores for nuclear weapons, used to "ignite" fusion and fissionable fuel. Fission cores resemble miniaturized versions of the Fat Man nuclear bomb detonated above Nagasaki. They are often called "triggers" in official and news documents to obfuscate their function. For much of its operational lifetime, Rocky Flats was the sole mass-producer of plutonium components for the United States' nuclear stockpile.

Management of the site passed to EG&G in 1990, which did not reapply for the contract in 1994. Management of the site passed to the Kaiser-Hill Company on July 1, 1995. The Department of Energy now manages the central portion of the site, where the production buildings once were, while the Fish and Wildlife Service has taken over management of the Peripheral Outer Unit.

== Sources of contamination ==
Most of the radioactive contamination from Rocky Flats came from three sources: a catastrophic fire in 1957, leaking barrels in an outdoor storage area in 1964–1968, and another, less severe fire in 1969. Plutonium, used to construct the weapons' fissile components, can spontaneously combust at room temperature in air. Additional sources of actinide contamination include inadequate pondcrete vitrification attempts and routine releases during the plant's operation.

=== 1957 fire ===
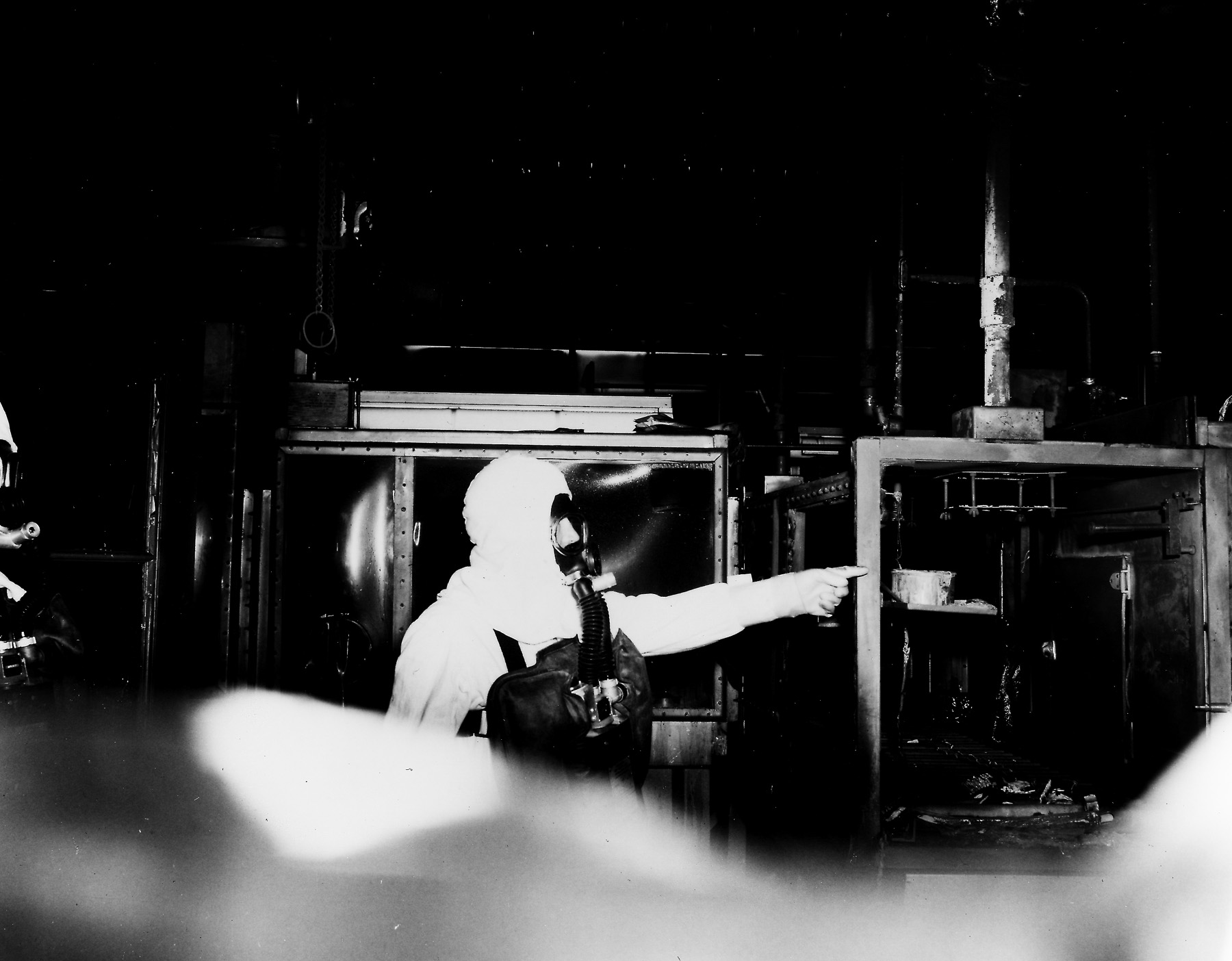
The glove box where the 1957 fire started

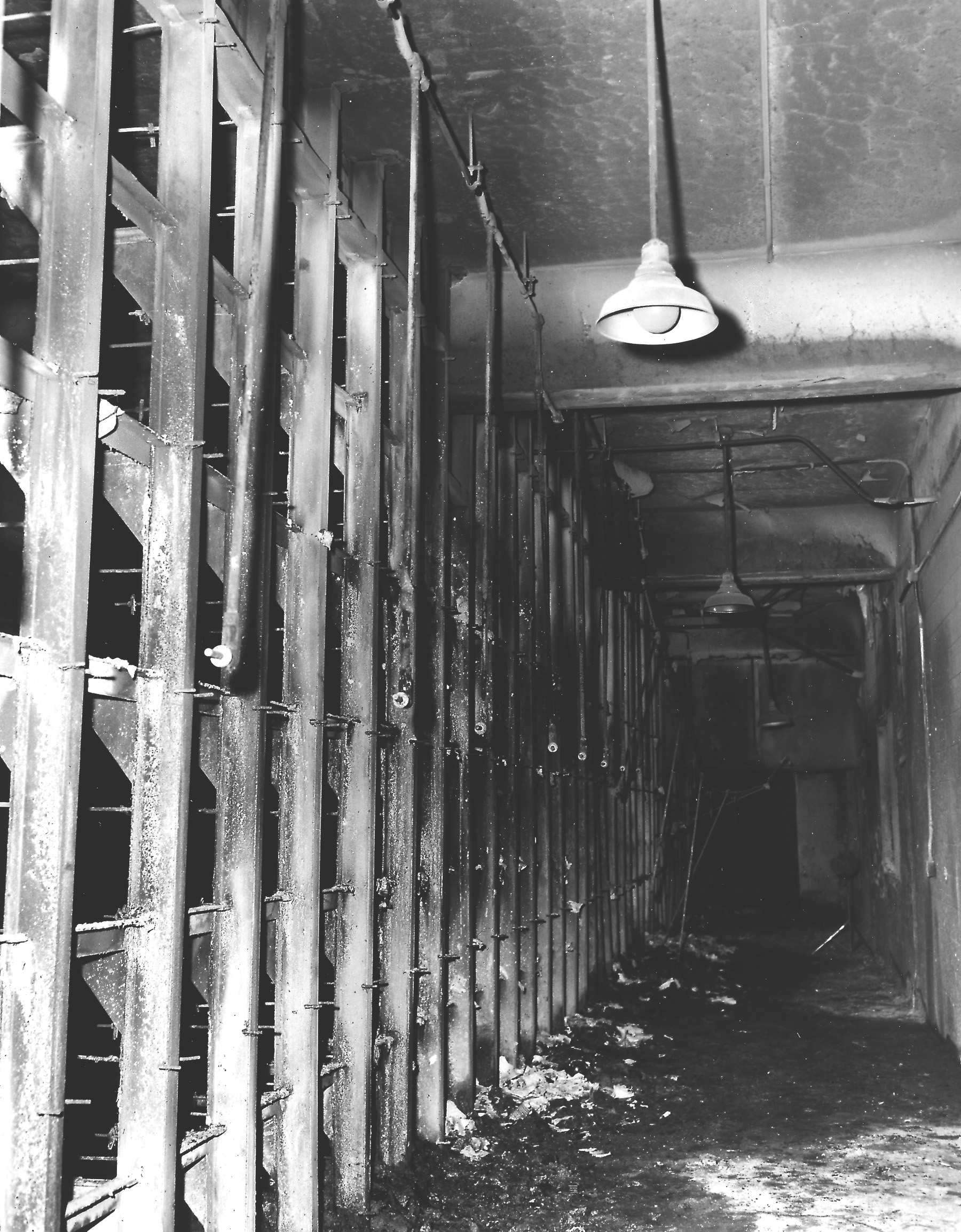
HEPA filter banks meant to remove microscopic particles of plutonium from the glove box exhaust streams were destroyed by the fire, allowing radioactive smoke to escape the building.

On the evening of September 11, 1957, plutonium shavings in a glove box in building 771, the Plutonium Recovery and Fabrication Facility, spontaneously ignited (plutonium is pyrophoric). The fire spread to the flammable glove box materials, including plexiglas windows and rubber gloves. It rapidly spread through the interconnected glove boxes and ignited a large bank of high-efficiency particulate air (HEPA) filters in a plenum downstream. Within minutes the first filters had burned out, allowing plutonium particles to escape from the building exhaust stacks. The building exhaust fans stopped operating due to fire damage at 10:40 PM, which ended most of the plutonium release. Firefighters initially used carbon dioxide fire extinguishers because water can act as a moderator and cause plutonium to go critical. They resorted to water hoses when the dry fire extinguishers proved ineffective.

The 1957 fire released 11–36 Ci (160–510 grams or 0.35–1.12 pounds) of plutonium, much of which contaminated off-site areas as microscopic particles entrained in smoke from the fire. Isopleth diagrams from studies show parts of Denver in the area where surface sampling detected plutonium. That the fire had resulted in significant plutonium contamination of surrounding populated areas remained secret. News reports at the time reported, per the Atomic Energy Commission's briefing, that there was slight risk of light contamination and that no firefighters had been contaminated. No abnormal radioactivity was reported by the Colorado Public Health Service.

=== Pad 903 leakage ===
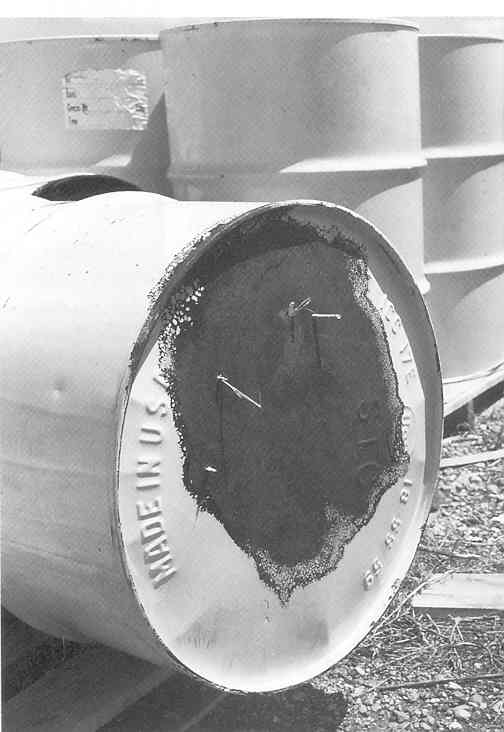
Corroded waste storage barrel at Pad 903

Plutonium milling operations produced large quantities of toxic cutting fluid contaminated with particles of plutonium and uranium. Thousands of 55-gallon drums of the waste were stored outside in an unprotected earthen area called the 903 pad storage area, where they corroded and leaked radionuclides over years into the soil and water. An estimated 5,000 US gallons (19,000 L; 4,200 imp gal) of plutonium-contaminated oil leached into the soil between 1964 and 1967. Portions of this waste, mixed with dust that composed Pad 903, became airborne in the heavy winds of the Front Range and contaminated offsite areas to the south and east.

Leaking storage barrels at Pad 903 released 1.4–15 Ci (19–208 grams or 0.042–0.459 pounds) of plutonium as airborne dust during the storage and subsequent attempts at remediation. Much more remains interred under the Pad 903 area, which has been paved over with asphalt.

=== 1969 fire ===
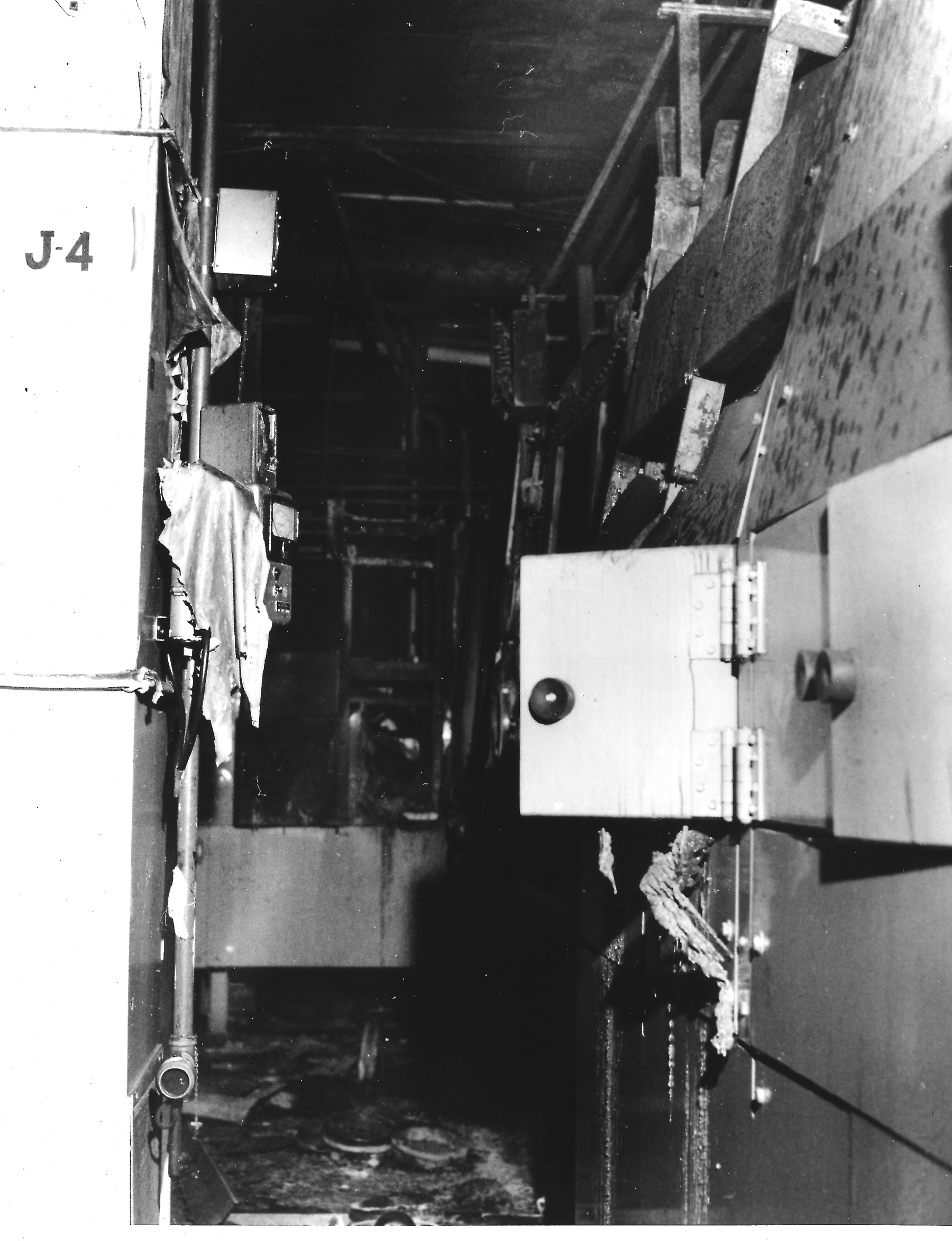
A room in building 776 damaged by the 1969 fire

Another major fire occurred on May 11, 1969, in building 776/777 (the Plutonium Processing Facility), again from spontaneous combustion of plutonium shavings in a glove box. Firefighters again resorted to water after dry extinguishers proved ineffective. Despite recommendations after the 1957 fire, suppression systems were not built into the glove boxes.

While the fire bore marked similarities to the 1957 fire, the level of contamination was less severe because the HEPA filters in the exhaust system did not burn through (after the 1957 fire, the filter material was changed from cellulose to nonflammable fiberglass). Had the filters failed or the roof (which sustained heavy fire damage) been breached, the release could have been more severe than the 1957 fire. About 1,400 kilograms (3,100 lb) of plutonium was in the storage area where the fire occurred, and about 3,400 kilograms (7,500 lb) total plutonium was in building 776/777.

The 1969 fire released 13–62 mCi (140–900 milligrams or 0.00031–0.00198 pounds) of plutonium, about 1/1000 as much as was released in the 1957 fire. But the 1969 fire led local health officials to perform independent tests of the area surrounding Rocky Flats to determine the extent of the contamination. This resulted in the first releases of information to the public that populated areas southeast of Rocky Flats had been contaminated.

=== Other sources ===
Rockwell workers mixed hazardous and other wastes with concrete to create one-ton solid blocks called pondcrete. These were stored in the open under tarps on asphalt pads. The pondcrete turned out to be weak storage, an outcome Rockwell's engineers had predicted. Relatively unprotected from the elements, the blocks began to leak and sag. Nitrates, cadmium and low-level radioactive waste began to leach into the ground and run downhill toward Walnut Creek and Woman Creek.

Most of the plutonium from Rocky Flats was oxidized plutonium, which does not readily dissolve in water. A large portion of the plutonium released into the creeks sank to the bottom and is now found in the streambeds of Walnut and Woman Creeks and on the bottom of local public reservoirs just outside Rocky Flats: Great Western Reservoir (no longer used for city of Broomfield drinking water consumption as of 1997 but still used for irrigation) and Standley Lake, a drinking water supply for the cities of Westminster, Thornton, Northglenn and some residents of Federal Heights. As one of several forms of remediation and once the extent of the lapses at Rocky Flats became public knowledge, several streams formed by drainage through the contaminated areas of the Rocky Flats Plant were diverted so that they would no longer flow directly into some of the local reservoirs, such as Mower Reservoir and Standley Lake. Also, a surface water control system was built to allow runoff from contaminated creeks to collect in holding ponds and thus reduce or prevent direct runoff into Standley Lake. Proposals to remove or breach some of these dams to reduce the cost of maintenance have been protested by the cities downstream.

== Reporting of contamination ==
No radioactivity warning, advisement or remediation was provided to the public regarding the 1957 fire, the worse of the two. At the time, AEC officials told the Denver Post that the fire "resulted in no spread of radioactive contamination of any consequence". The public was not informed of substantial contamination from the 1957 fire until after the highly visible 1969 fire, when civilian monitoring teams confronted government officials with measurements made outside the plant of radioactive contamination suspected to be from the 1969 fire, which consumed hundreds of pounds of plutonium (850 kg).

The 1969 fire raised public awareness of potential hazards the plant posed and led to years of increasing citizen protests and demands for plant closure. Releases from previous years had not been reported publicly before the fire; airborne-become-groundborne radioactive contamination extending well beyond the Rocky Flats plant was not publicly reported until the 1970s.

Most contamination was centralized in the 385 acres where the 800 industrial buildings were.

In 2002, the U.S. Fish and Wildlife Service surveyed tissues harvested from deer that lived at Rocky Flats for plutonium and other actinides. Isotopes of plutonium, americium, and uranium were detected, with the highest measured activity being 0.0125 pCi/g of uranium-233, 234. The study found that the increased cancer risk to an individual who ate 28 kilograms (62 lb) of Rocky Flats deer meat per year for 70 years was at most 1 in 210,000. This is near the conservative end of the EPA's acceptable risk range.

In August 2019, the Colorado Department of Public Health and Environment observed mixed results during testing of the Rocky Flats area for soil contamination. The testing, completed by the Jefferson Parkway Public Highway Authority in preparation for road construction, observed one soil sample with a plutonium level of 264 picocuries per gram. For reference, the Rocky Flats remediation standard is 50 picocuries per gram. A second sample registered just 1.5 picocuries of plutonium per gram. As of October 2019, testing of the area was ongoing. In February 2020, the parkway construction project was shut down and local civic authorities withdrew their support when plutonium samples with concentrations five times higher than the remediation standard were found.

== Contamination and health studies ==
Plutonium hexafluoride

Plutonium-239 and 240 emit ionizing radiation in the form of alpha particles. Inhalation is the primary pathway by which plutonium enters the body, though plutonium can also enter the body through a wound. Once inhaled, plutonium can increase the risk of lung cancer, liver cancer, bone cancer, and leukemia. Once absorbed into the body, the biological half-life of plutonium is about 200 years. This means that only a small fraction of the plutonium will be excreted during the average person's lifetime, and the rest will remain in the body where it can do harm.

Following the public 1969 fire, surveys were taken of the land outside the boundaries of Rocky Flats to quantify the amount of plutonium contamination. Researchers noted that plutonium contamination from the plant was present, but did not match the wind conditions of the 1969 fire. The 1957 fire and leaking barrels on Pad 903 have since been confirmed to be the main sources of plutonium contamination. Authors Krey and Hardy estimated the total quantity of plutonium contamination outside of Rocky Flats's boundaries to be 2.6 Ci (36 grams or 1.3 ounces), while Poet and Martell estimated the value to be 6.6 Ci (92 grams or 3.2 ounces). The study also noted that plutonium levels just outside the boundaries of the plant were hundreds of times higher than the background level caused by global fallout from nuclear testing, and that contamination to the north of the plant was probably caused by normal operations rather than accidental releases.

From September 1947 to April 1969, there were 5 or more accidental surface water releases of tritium. Tritium, a radioactive element which was found in scrap material from Rocky Flats, was therefore directed into the Great Western Reservoir. This was uncovered in 1973 and following this, urine samples were taken from people living or working near Broomfield who could have drunk water from the reservoir. The findings of the samples showed that those who were exposed to contaminated water had tritium concentrations near seven times higher than normal (4,300 picocuries per liter versus 600 picocuries per liter). However, when the same group underwent urine sampling three years later, their tritium concentrations had returned to the standard.

A 1981 study by Dr. Carl Johnson, health director for Jefferson County, showed a 45% increase in congenital birth defects in Denver suburbs downwind of Rocky Flats compared to the rest of Colorado. Moreover, he found a 16% increase in cancer rates for those living closest to the plant as compared to those on the outer perimeter of the area, whereas the DOE estimated one. A 1987 study by Crump and others did not find the cancer rates in the northwestern portion of Denver to be significantly higher than other parts of the city and attributed variance in cancer rates to the population density of urban areas. Crump's conclusions were contested by Johnson in a letter to the journal editor. In a 1992 survey of radiation risk analysis, the authors concluded, "Johnson failed to describe an effective and complete model for the cause of the cancers and its relationship to other knowledge as Crump et al. have done. Therefore, Crump et al.'s explanation must be preferred."

In 1983, University of Colorado Medical School professor John C. Cobb and the EPA reported plutonium concentrations from about 500 persons who had died in Colorado. A comparison study was done of those who lived near Rocky Flats with those who lived far from this nuclear weapons production site. The ratio of Pu-240 to Pu-239 was "minutely lower" for persons who lived within 50 km of Rocky Flats, but was more strongly correlated to age, gender, and smoking habits than proximity to the plant.

In 1991, the Department of Energy's public affairs group published a pamphlet stating that the inhalation of sediments that become resuspended in the air is considered the most significant pathway that could expose human beings to plutonium from the contaminated local reservoirs, but also stated that the airborne plutonium concentrations as measured by downwind air monitors remained below the DOE standard. In a 1999 analysis, it was found that "the major event contributing the highest individual risk from plutonium released from Rocky Flats was the 1957 fire", with wind distribution of plutonium from the 903 Pad Storage Area being the next greatest source of health risk. In this analysis, health risk estimates for off-site humans had a variance of four orders of magnitude, from "between 2.0×10^{−4} (95th percentile) and 2.2×10^{−8} (5th percentile), with a median risk estimate of 2.3×10^{−6}." The DOE maintains a list of Rocky Flats epidemiological studies.

In 1995, a report over 8,000 pages long was released by the Plutonium Working Group Report on Environmental, Safety and Health Vulnerabilities Associated with the Department's Plutonium Storage. This report listed Rocky Flats as having 5 of the 14 most vulnerable facilities based on plutonium environmental, safety, and health vulnerability at all Department of Energy facilities.

During the early 1990s, an independent Health Advisory Panel – appointed by then-Governor Roy Romer – oversaw a series of reports, called the Historical Public Exposure Studies. The 12-member Health Advisory Panel included multiple medical doctors, scientists, PhDs, and local officials. The Rocky Flats Historical Public Exposure Studies involved nine years of research. The Studies had three main objectives: (1) create a public record of plant operations and accidents that contributed to contaminant releases from the Rocky Flats Plant between 1952 and 1989; (2) assess public exposures to contaminants and potential risks from past releases; and (3) determine the need for future studies. The Studies' research included identification and assessment of chemicals and radioactive materials from past releases; estimates of risk to residents living or working in surrounding communities during the Plant's operation from 1952 to 1989; an evaluation of possible exposure pathways; and, dose assessments for historical releases.

Voelz and colleagues found that exposure to external radiation cause six of the total eight causes of brain tumors occurred in workers and two occurred from plutonium exposure. The study consisted of 7,112 white male workers who were employed, between 1952 through 1979, at the Rocky Flats Factory. Total mortality was increased specifically with those who got brain cancer. Wilkinson et al. studied employees who worked at the factory between 1956 and 1980 and found higher mortality rates paired with leukemia, higher rates of plutonium in urine, and higher rates of radiation to the liver and brain.

Viet and colleagues did a case-control study, published as "Chronic Beryllium Disease and Beryllium Sensitization at the Rocky Flats: A Case Control Study", with employees of the Rocky Flats Plant to evaluate the risk of beryllium sensitization (BSENS) and chronic beryllium disease (CBD). The 124 individuals in the study worked in the plant from 1960 to 1988 and they all had different jobs, but were exposed to beryllium through inhalation and skin contact. The researchers found those with CBD had higher exposure estimates and more years of employment compared to those not in the control study. Those with BSENS did not have significant differences with their control group. Viet and colleagues concluded if there is a decrease in exposure it could lessen the risk for CBD, but not for BSENS.

In 2003, Dr. James Ruttenber led a study on the health effects of plutonium. Conducted by the University of Colorado Health Sciences Center and the Colorado Department of Public Health and Environment, the study concluded that lung cancer is linked to plutonium inhalation. "We have supporting evidence from other studies that, along with our findings, support the hypothesis that plutonium exposure causes lung cancer", Ruttenber said. His group's findings were part of a broader study that tracked 16,303 people who worked at the Rocky Flats plant between 1952 and 1989. Their research also found that these workers were 2.5 times more likely to develop brain tumors than other people.

Many findings linking workers and other cancer development are muddled due to the "strong healthy worker effect" (that workers tend to have lower overall death rates than general population because those that are ill or disabled are restricted from working). Also the standard mortality rates for cancers of the stomach and rectum were found to be much higher than other studies of nuclear workers, which indicates the necessity for further study since inhalation of plutonium can distribute to these areas.

Many people who were employees of the Rocky Flats Plant talk about their struggles with chronic beryllium disease and issues they are dealing with today. They describe how the plant had them take minimum precautions to combat the toxic fumes, but it was never enough. Many of them have fallen ill and have to carry the effects with them for the rest of their lives.

In February 2006, the Rocky Flats Stewardship Council was formed to address post-closure management of Rocky Flats. The council includes elected officials from nine municipal governments neighboring Rocky Flats and four skilled/experienced organizations and/or individuals. Information about the council is available on their website.

In 2016, the Colorado Department of Public Health and Environment announced its Cancer Registry was preparing a follow-up cancer study to its original 1998 report on cancer incidence in the vicinity of the former Rocky Flats Plant. The original report and 2016 report found no pattern of increased cancers in communities around Rocky Flats. In 2017, a follow-up cancer study was conducted by the Cancer Registry, which specifically found no pattern of increased thyroid or rare cancers in communities around Rocky Flats.

== Legal actions ==
Subsequent to reports of environmental crimes being committed at Rocky Flats, the United States Department of Justice sponsored an FBI raid dubbed "Operation Desert Glow", which began at 9 a.m. on June 6, 1989. The FBI entered the premises under the ruse of providing a terrorist threat briefing, and served its search warrant to Dominick Sanchini, Rockwell International's manager of Rocky Flats.

The FBI raid led to the formation of Colorado's first special grand jury, the juried testimony of 110 witnesses, reviews of 2,000 exhibits and ultimately a 1992 plea agreement in which Rockwell admitted to 10 federal environmental crimes and agreed to pay $18.5 million in fines out of its own funds. This amount was less than the company had been paid in bonuses for running the plant as determined by the GAO, and yet was also by far the highest hazardous-waste fine ever, four times the previous record. Due to DOE indemnification of its contractors, without some form of settlement being arrived at between the U.S. Justice Department and Rockwell the cost of paying any civil penalties would ultimately have been borne by U.S. taxpayers. While any criminal penalties allotted to Rockwell would not have been covered by U.S. taxpayers, Rockwell claimed that the Department of Energy had specifically exempted them from most environmental laws, including hazardous waste.

As forewarned by the prosecuting U.S. Attorney, Ken Fimberg (later Ken Scott), the Department of Justice's stated findings and plea agreement with Rockwell were heavily contested by its own, 23-member special grand jury. Press leaks by both members of the DOJ and the grand jury occurred in violation of secrecy Rule 6(e) regarding grand jury information. The public contest led to U.S. Congressional oversight committee hearings chaired by Congressman Howard Wolpe, which issued subpoenas to DOJ principals despite several instances of the DOJ's refusal to comply. The hearings, whose findings include that the Justice Department had "bargained away the truth", ultimately still did not fully reveal the special grand jury's report to the public, which remains sealed by the court.

The special grand jury report was nonetheless leaked to Westword and excerpts published in its September 29, 1992 issue. According to its subsequent publications, the Rocky Flats special grand jury had compiled indictments charging three DOE officials and five Rockwell employees with environmental crimes. The grand jury also wrote a report, intended for the public's consumption per their charter, lambasting the conduct of DOE and Rocky Flats contractors for "engaging in a continuing campaign of distraction, deception and dishonesty" and noted that Rocky Flats, for many years, had discharged pollutants, hazardous materials and radioactive matter into nearby creeks and Broomfield's and Westminster's water supplies.

The DOE itself, in a study released in December of the year prior to the FBI raid, called Rocky Flats' ground water the single greatest environmental hazard at any of its nuclear facilities. From the grand jury's report: "The DOE reached this conclusion because the groundwater contamination was so extensive, toxic, and migrating toward the drinking water supplies for the Cities of Broomfield and Westminster, Colorado."

A class action lawsuit, Cook v. Rockwell International Corp., was filed in January 1990 against Rockwell and Dow Chemical (due to the indemnity of nuclear contractors, the award would have been paid by the federal government). Sixteen years later, the plaintiffs were awarded $926 million in economic damages, punitive damages. In May 2016, U.S. District Judge John L. Kane gave preliminary approval for a $375 million settlement against the Rockwell International Corp. and Dow Chemical Co. Nearly 26 years later, approximately 13,000 to 15,000 eligible property owners could receive monetary payments for damages and decreased property values. Property and homeowners who owned property on June 7, 1989, the day the FBI raided the plant, are eligible to file a claim for property devaluation. The deadline to file a claim was June 1, 2017.

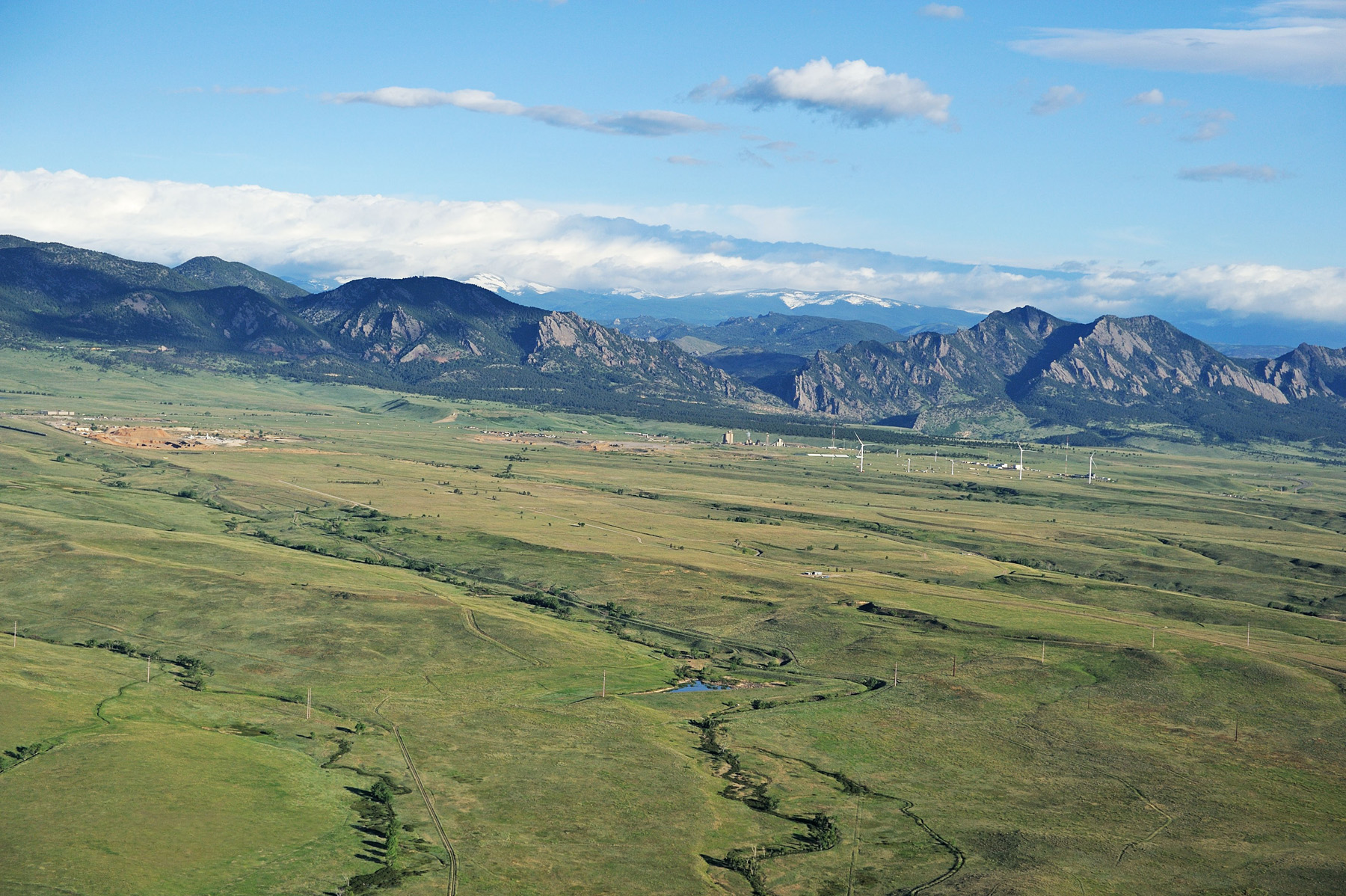
Rocky Flats site in 2011

Carl Johnson sued Jefferson County for unlawful termination, after he was forced to resign from his position as Director of the Jefferson County Health Department. He alleged that his termination was due to concerns by the board members that his reports of contamination would lower property values. The suit was settled out of court for $150,000.

In May 2018, local activists sued the U.S. Fish & Wildlife Service and filed a motion for a preliminary injunction, asking a federal court to stop the planned opening of Refuge access points. On August 9, 2018, the court denied the activists' motion, explaining that "plaintiffs failed to meet their burden to show that they will likely suffer irreparable harm". In addition, the court later rejected activists' motion to add documents to the administrative record. The court observed that plaintiffs statements in support of this motion were "conclusory". See Civil Action No. 18-cv-01017-PB. The activists had previously sued in 2017. The court dismissed this lawsuit and awarded costs to the U.S. Fish & Wildlife Service. In September 2018, Rocky Flats National Wildlife Refuge opened to the public.

== Legacy ==
Denver's automotive beltway does not include a component in the northwest sector, partly due to concerns over unremediated plutonium contamination.

According to the Rocky Flats National Wildlife Refuge Act of 2001, the land transferred from DOE to the US Fish and Wildlife Service was to be used as a wildlife refuge once Rocky Flats remediation was complete. In order to help guide the future of Rocky Flats care and management, the Rocky Flats Stewardship Council was formed in 2006 after the US Congress, DOE and previous organization created the new council.

The EPA's remediation protocol divided the Rocky Flats Plant into two distinct areas, or operational units (OUs). OU1 was 1,308 acres (529 ha) and included the center of the property where the majority of the industrial buildings were located. The other area was OU2, also called the buffer zone. It included 4,883 acres (1,976 ha) of peripheral space. The EPA focused its accelerated remediation actions on OU1 because it contained the most contaminations. The actions included "decommissioning, decontamination, demolition, and removal of more than 800 structures; removal of more than 500,000 cubic meters of low-level radioactive waste; and remediation of more than 360 potentially contaminated environmental sites". Once accelerated remediation was complete, the EPA initiated long-term countermeasures such as "institutional controls, physical controls, monitoring and signage". There is still some residual contamination located at OU1, but studies show there is no health threat.

Remediation of Rocky Flats was finished in 2006 and verified by the EPA and CDPHE in 2007 after ten years and almost $7 billion. However, this was a "project that had originally been estimated by the DOE to take up to sixty-five years at a cost of $37 billion". Residual contamination below levels of regulatory concern remain. Plutonium-239, with a 24,000 year half-life, will persist in the environment hundreds of thousands of years. Volatile organic compounds have a much shorter lifespan. Heavy metals will persist in perpetuity.

In 2006, according to DOE, "The selected remedy/corrective action for the Peripheral OU is no action. The RI/FS report (RCRA Facility Investigation-Remedial Investigation/Corrective Measures Study – Feasibility Study) concludes that the Peripheral OU is already in a state protective of human health and the environment."

In 2007, the "Peripheral Operable Unit" (Peripheral OU) land area of Rocky Flats was transferred from DOE to FWS for use and preservation as the Rocky Flats National Wildlife Refuge. During the environmental investigation and sampling, it had been determined that levels of residual contamination were so low, no remediation was required; the Refuge land was already in a state suitable for any use. In 2017, a statutorily-required review confirmed the Refuge was suitable for any use, prior to its formal opening. In contrast, the DOE-retained "Central Operable Unit" of Rocky Flats remains under DOE control, and is subject to ongoing monitoring and sampling and groundwater treatment.

Multiple assessments of Rocky Flats indicate that the long-term health risk to citizens living outside the boundaries of Rocky Flats is negligible, but citizen organizations feel that the remediation of the site was inadequate, despite the achievement of legal and regulatory requirements.

An independent Public Health Assessment, completed by the Agency for Toxic Substances and Disease Registry (ATSDR), concluded that "the available sampling data, epidemiological studies, exposure investigations and other relevant reports paint a consistent picture of the public health implications of environmental contamination": "past, current and future exposures are below levels associated with adverse health effects". ATSDR specifically considered children's health when evaluating exposures and their public health implications. Overall, ATSDR did not identify any environmental exposures at levels of public health concern for past and current exposures. Notably, past and current inhalation exposures to site-related air emissions presented no apparent public health hazard.

In March 2006, the Rocky Flats Stewardship Council was formed to address post-closure management of Rocky Flats and provide a forum for public discussion. This organization was the successor organization to the Rocky Flats Coalition of Local Governments, which advocated for stakeholders during the site remediation. The Council includes elected officials from nine municipal governments neighboring Rocky Flats and four skilled/experienced organizations and/or individuals. Information and Council meetings minutes and reports are available on its website. Members of the public are welcome to attend Council meetings and make public comments.

In 2014, the U.S. Fish and Wildlife Services proposed a controlled burn on 701 acres of the Wildlife Refuge. In 2015, they reported that they will postpone those burns until 2017. In 2015, there was a "soft opening" of the Rocky Flats Wildlife Refuge where small groups of people could reserve space on a three-mile guided nature walk. The Rocky Flats National Wildlife Refuge opened to the public on September 15, 2018.

In 2015, Rocky Mountain Downwinders was founded to study health effects in people who lived east of the facility while it was operational. The group set up an online health survey conducted by Metropolitan State University of Denver. Nicolas Hansen, a Denver litigation attorney, founded this group. To date, no final survey report has been published by the Downwinders. In 2018, Metropolitan State University of Denver announced it would not to continue to participate in the health survey.

== Public opposition and support ==
On the weekend of April 28, 1979, more than 15,000 people demonstrated against the Rocky Flats Nuclear Weapons Plant. The protest was coordinated with other anti-nuclear demonstrations across the country. Daniel Ellsberg and Allen Ginsberg were among the 284 people who were arrested. The demonstration followed more than six months of continuous protests that included an attempted blockade of the railroad tracks leading to the site. Large pro-nuclear counter demonstrations were also staged that year.

In 1983, the Rocky Mountain Peace and Justice Center was founded with a goal of closing the Rocky Flats plant. The center has since set goals of keeping the Rocky Flats National Wildlife Refuge closed to the public, preventing construction of highways in or near the site of the former plant, and preventing new housing construction in the area. The center is a 501(c)(3) non-profit corporation an, as of 2014, has one full-time employee.

On October 15, 1983, about 10,000 demonstrators turned out for protest at the Rocky Flats Nuclear Weapons Plant (well short of the 21,000 hoped for by protest organizers). No arrests were made. On August 10, 1987 (the 42nd anniversary of the atomic bombing of Nagasaki), 320 demonstrators were arrested after they tried to force a one-day shutdown of the plant. A similar protest with a turnout of about 3,500 was staged on August 6, 1989 (the anniversary of the nuclear bombing of Hiroshima). Though public demonstrations against plant operations ceased with the decommissioning of the plant, activists continue to protest disposal of nuclear waste from the site and the scale and scope of remediation operations. Since 2013, opposition has focused on the Candelas residential development located along the southern border of the former Plant site.

With the establishment of the Rocky Flats National Wildlife Refuge Act in 2001, a 300 ft strip on the eastern edge of the refuge was allocated to Jefferson County for construction of the Jefferson County Parkway. In May 2008, the Jefferson Parkway Public Highway Authority was established to complete this last portion of the Denver metro beltway. Opponents of the parkway are concerned about the disruption of plutonium laden soil from excavation of the area to build the parkway. In April 2015, the WestConnect Corridor Coalition was formed with the hopes of bringing about the end of a decades long dispute to the completion of the Jefferson County Parkway. However, by October 2015, the WestConnect Corridor had withdrawn its support from the parkway, determining that the decision to build the parkway should be made outside of the coalition's process.

As of 2019, Candelas, a large housing development in West Arvada on the south side of Rocky Flats Wildlife Refuge is being built and rented out. A group named Candelas Glows is opposed to a large housing and commercial development planned in the area, which the group calls a "plutonium dust bowl." The Department of Energy responded by saying that studies show more risk from naturally occurring radioactive elements than from very small amounts of plutonium remaining around the former plant. Candelas Glows argued that a July 2015 radiation report from the Rocky Flats Stewardship Council shows plutonium levels at 1.02 pCi/L, compared to the regulatory standard of 0.15 pCi/L.

While anti-Refuge activists have received the bulk of media attention, other community members support the Refuge opening and have found the remediation records to be scientific. A 2018 survey by Friends of the Rocky Flats National Wildlife Refuge also found that most area residents support the Refuge opening.

To date, no lawsuits by anti-Parkway and anti-Refuge groups have succeeded in court. Regardless, the parkway project was halted after a Parkway Authority soil sampling program discovered elevated plutonium levels in February 2020. Local civic authorities have withdrawn from the parkway project.

Regarding a professional health assessment of the Rocky Flats Plant's ongoing impact on the local and surrounding area, and the Refuge specifically, Dr. Mark Johnson—no relation to Dr. Carl Johnson, but subsequently also Jefferson County's executive health director—states in the September 2020 book Doom With a View: Historical and Cultural Contexts of the Rocky Flats Nuclear Weapons Plant (quotes from a related Westword article):

The more time I spent conversing with politicians and contract managers from Rocky Flats, and the more I learned about the nuclear and hazardous waste pollution occurring around the plant, the more I came to question the underlying narrative that this was fundamentally a patriotic enterprise protecting America from its enemies. Gradually I came to view it as an industry that was greatly benefiting from the veil of secrecy and the apparently total level of liability indemnity that was being supplied to it by the DOE. Because of this screen of secrecy and an ultimate lack of accountability, it appeared to me that the Rocky Flats contractors had contaminated Jefferson County and its residents indiscriminately with no fear of consequences.

... It is uncontested by all involved that there has been a detectable level of nuclear contamination in both the refuge buffer zone and on the private property outside of the Rocky Flats reserve. What is still contested is how much contamination took place, how far the contamination spread, and what risk there is to the public from the contamination, both on- and off-site.

... I have called for an independent review of all the collected Rocky Flats data to determine where the risk lies. I have also called for the unsealing of the Rocky Flats grand jury report. I believe the public has the right to know what occurred at Rocky Flats, and what the risk may still be of recreating on or living near the refuge.

... Two of the men who have seen the most evidence concerning the level of contamination at Rocky Flats, the lead agent for the FBI raid and the foreman of the grand jury, continue to advocate for the prohibition of public access to the site. This gives me great pause.

== See also ==
- Ozyorsk, Chelyabinsk Oblast
- U.S. Department of Energy
- U.S. Environmental Protection Agency
- Hazardous waste management
- Risk assessment
- Environmental law
- CERCLA
- List of Superfund sites
- Price-Anderson Act
- Dark Circle (film)
- Making a Real Killing: Rocky Flats and the Nuclear West
- Rocky Flats Truth Force
- Nuclear and radiation accidents by country
- Candelas, Colorado
- Cold War
- Kristen Iversen, author of Full Body Burden: Growing Up in the Nuclear Shadow of Rocky Flats
- Downwinders
