= Kristen Iversen =

American writer

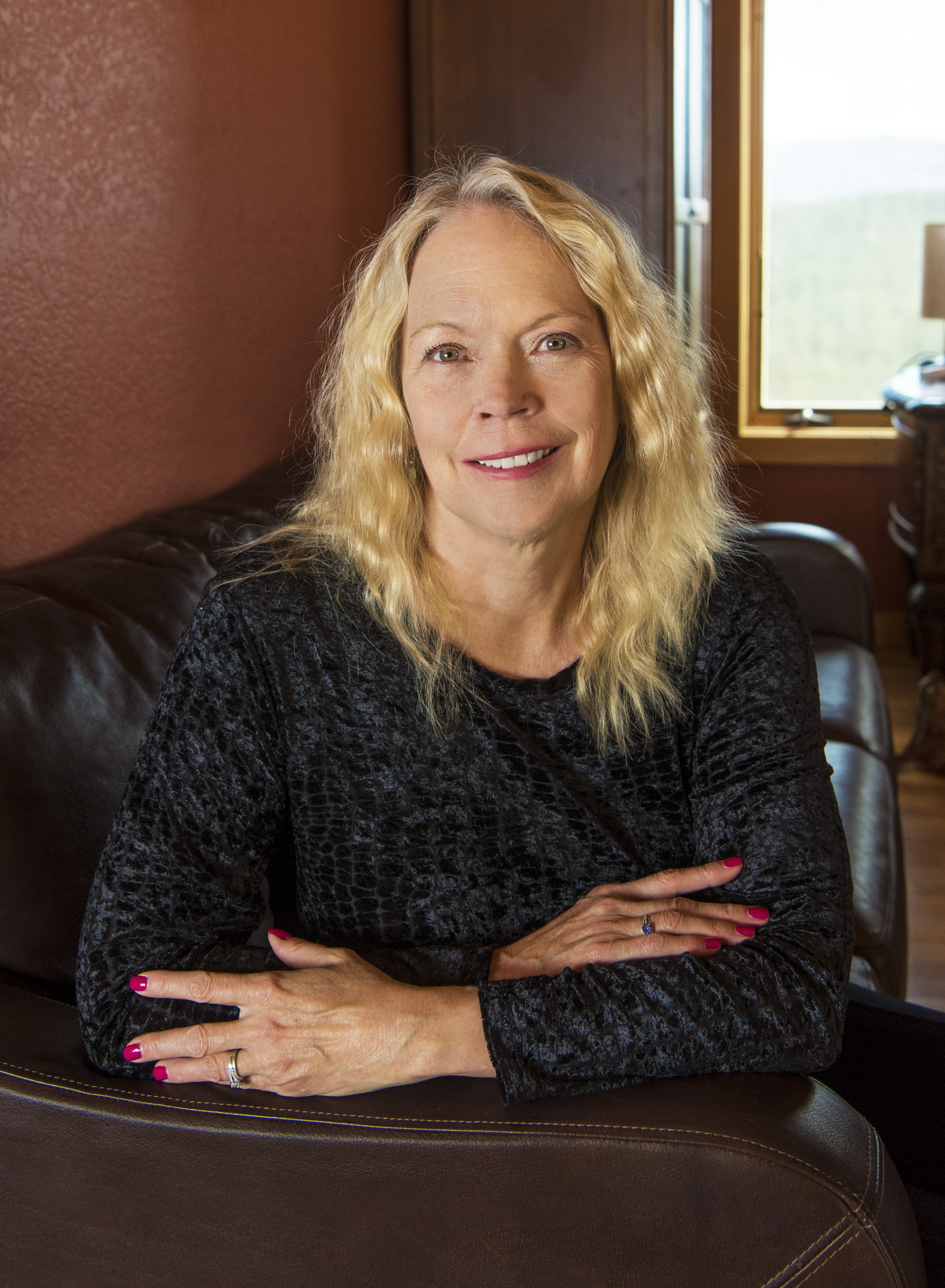
- Kristen Iversen, Author
- Born: Des Moines, Iowa, U.S.
- Education: Ph.D, University of Denver
- Occupations: Writer, professor
- Writing career
- Genres: Nonfiction, Memoir, Fiction
- Website: www.kristeniversen.com

Kristen Iversen is an American author, professor, journalist, and scholar whose work interweaves memoir, history, and investigative nonfiction. A 2026 Guggenheim Fellow in Biography, she is also a Fulbright Scholar, an NEH Public Scholar, the 2025–2026 Leon Levy/Alfred P. Sloan Fellow at CUNY, and a two-time winner of the Colorado Book Award. Her memoir Full Body Burden: Growing Up in the Nuclear Shadow of Rocky Flats won the Colorado Book Award and the Reading the West Book Award, was named a Best Book of 2012 by Kirkus Reviews and the American Library Association, and is the basis of a forthcoming documentary. Her books include Full Body Burden, Molly Brown: Unraveling the Myth, and Shadow Boxing: Art and Craft in Creative Nonfiction; she also edited Doom with a View and co-edited Don’t Look Now and When I Knew. Her forthcoming biography, The Poet of Science: Nikola Tesla in the Gilded Age, will be published by Crown. Iversen has taught at universities across the United States and abroad and is currently Professor of English at the University of Cincinnati, where she also serves as Literary Nonfiction Editor of The Cincinnati Review. Originally from Colorado, she is married and has two sons.

== Life and work ==
Kristen Iversen was born in Des Moines, Iowa, and grew up in Arvada, Colorado, near the Rocky Flats nuclear weaponry facility. Her father was a small-town attorney and her mother worked as a public health nurse. The eldest of four children, Iversen attended Colorado State University and then transferred to the University of Colorado at Boulder, where she received a BA in English/Creative Writing. She worked as a travel writer in Europe for several years before returning to the states to earn a Ph.D. in English and Creative Writing from the University of Denver.

Iversen has taught at universities around the country, including the MFA programs at San Jose State University and Naropa University. She served as director of the MFA Program in Creative Writing at the University of Memphis and as editor-in-chief of The Pinch, an award-winning literary journal. During the summers, she has taught in the MFA Low-Residency Program at the University of New Orleans, held in San Miguel de Allende, Mexico, and Edinburgh, Scotland. She is also a Faculty Mentor in the Mile High MFA program at Regis University in Denver, Colorado. As of August 2014, Iversen teaches in the Ph.D. program in Creative Writing at the University of Cincinnati, where she also serves as Literary Nonfiction Editor of The Cincinnati Review and was a Fellow at the Taft Research Center. She also serves as Director of the Prose, Poetry, and Passion Seminar in San Miguel de Allende, Mexico.

She is the author of Full Body Burden: Growing Up in the Nuclear Shadow of Rocky Flats, a book of memoir and investigative journalism that traces her experience of growing up in a small Colorado community near Rocky Flats, a secret nuclear weapons plant once designated as “the most contaminated site in America.” Iversen later worked at the plant herself. Full Body Burden won the 2013 Colorado Book Award and the Reading the West Book Award in Nonfiction. It was also chosen one of the Best Books of 2012 by Kirkus Reviews and the American Library Association, and 2012 Best Book about Justice by The Atlantic. The book was a finalist for the Barnes & Noble Discover Award and the Andrew Carnegie Medal for Excellence. In 2012, an excerpt from Full Body Burden was published in the June 11th edition of The Nation. Many universities have chosen Full Body Burden for their First Year Experience/Common Read programs and it has been translated into several languages. This book is being made into a forthcoming documentary film, Full Body Burden, and it has been optioned for a television series.

Iversen also edited an anthology of essays and articles about Rocky Flats by various experts around the country entitled Doom with a View: Historical and Cultural Contexts of Rocky Flats, published in October 2020. A collection of literary essays, Don't Look Now: Things We Wish We Hadn't Seen, co-edited with David Lazar, was published in November 2020 and features the work of leading writers of literary nonfiction.

Iversen's textbook, Shadow Boxing: Art and Craft in Creative Nonfiction, was the first in its field to cover the subgenres of creative nonfiction. Her first book, Molly Brown: Unraveling the Myth, is a biography of Margaret Tobin Brown, known to history as “the Unsinkable Molly Brown.” The book won the Colorado Book Award for Biography and the Barbara Sudler Award for Nonfiction and formed the basis for seven documentaries, including the A&E Biography Molly Brown: An American Legend and Molly Brown: Biography of a Changing Nation. A new edition of the book was published in 2018. In 2020, a revival of the musical The Unsinkable Molly Brown opened in New York, based on Iversen's book. Iversen's essays and stories have appeared in The New York Times, The Guardian, The American Scholar, and many other publications. In 2023 she was awarded a Taft Fellowship for Fall 2023 in support of a book-in-progress on the KKK in the West.

Kristen Iversen is currently completing a literary biography of Nikola Tesla entitled The Poet of Science: Nikola Tesla in the Gilded Age, forthcoming from Crown. Research for this book has involved extensive travel throughout the United States and Europe.

Iversen is married to George Vujnovich, a pilot, and she has two grown sons. She divides her time between New York, Cincinnati, Ohio and Westcliffe, Colorado.

== Full Body Burden summary ==
Full Body Burden: Growing Up in the Nuclear Shadow of Rocky Flats is a 2012 work of memoir and investigative journalism fusing Iversen's personal story of growing up in Cold War America with the history of the former Rocky Flats Nuclear Plant near Denver, Colorado, once called by the Department of Energy “the most contaminated site in America.”

From 1952 to 1989 there were many fires, leaks, and other mishaps at Rocky Flats. The area became severely contaminated, and little attention was paid to containment and environmental remediation. Carl J. Johnson, director of health between 1973 and 1981, led research into contamination levels and adverse effects on public health, until his employment was terminated. His research results were supported and confirmed by many subsequent studies.

Recent studies indicate that areas on and near the Rocky Flats site are still contaminated with plutonium and may pose a significant health risk.

== Books ==
- Doom with a View: Historical and Cultural Contexts of Rocky Flats. Fulcrum Books, 2020.
- Don't Look Now: Things We Wish We Hadn't Seen. Co-edited with David Lazar. Ohio State University Press, 2020.
- Full Body Burden: Growing up in the Nuclear Shadow of Rocky Flats. Crown Publishing Group. 2012. ISBN 978-0-307-95563-0.
- Molly Brown: Unraveling the Myth. Big Earth Publishing. 1999. ISBN 978-1-55566-237-0.
- Shadow Boxing: Art and Craft in Creative Nonfiction. Pearson. 2003.

== See also ==
- Physicians for Social Responsibility Colorado’s Symposium on Rocky Flats: Impacts on the Environment and Health, April 23, 2022
- Radioactive contamination from the Rocky Flats Plant
- Dark Circle (film)
- Making a Real Killing: Rocky Flats and the Nuclear West
- Rocky Flats Truth Force
- Nuclear and radiation accidents by country
- Downwinders
