= Candelas, Colorado =

Master-planned community in Arvada, Colorado, US

Candelas
- Interactive map of Candelas

General information
- Location: Arvada, Colorado
- Coordinates: 39.866033°N 105.169393°W
- Status: Under Construction

Other information
- Governing body: Cimarron Metro District Candelas HOA and City of Arvada

Candelas is the largest master-planned community in Arvada, Colorado. The residential portion of the community is developed by Terra Causa Capital and GF Properties Group (a wholly owned subsidiary of the Southern Ute Indian Tribe), with residences built by Century Communities, Richmond American, Ryland Homes, Standard Pacific Homes, Village Homes, and various custom builders. Plans exist for commercial development in the future, in the form of two mixed-use commercial spaces, and a town center, comprising some 7.1 million square feet of commerce in the community. The formal plan was filed with the Jefferson County Recorder on April 21, 2011.

== Geography ==
The Candelas master planned community is within the most north-western quadrant of Arvada in Jefferson County, Colorado. The development borders the Rocky Flats National Wildlife Refuge all along its (i.e., Candelas's) northern property line. Candelas is divided into six subsections from east to west: Parkview, Mountainview, Canyonview, Valleyview, Townview, and Skyview.

=== Location ===
The Candelas community is located in northwest Arvada, CO. It is on the north side of Hwy 72 between Hwy 93 and Indiana St. The Rocky Flats Wildlife Refuge is to the north and shares a borders with part of the community. There are two access points to the Refuge. Residents within the area can use State Highway 93 to access Golden or Boulder.

==== Natural Hazards ====
The Candelas development is located where geography and topography foster and enhance severe weather, including winds in excess of 80/mph (135 km/h). Certain severe weather events have brought winds over 140 mph to the location, including devastating windstorms in January 1982 caused in part by the Chinook winds. In addition to high wind hazards, the area experiences extreme winter weather conditions, severe thunderstorms (including localized flash flooding), and wildfire.

== Proximity to Rocky Flats ==
The location is south of the former site of the Rocky Flats nuclear weapons production facility. Environmental groups have expressed concern that the radioactive and toxic contaminants from plant operations and accidental releases have not been sufficiently remediated. The U.S. Environmental Protection Agency, U.S. Department of Energy, Colorado Department of Public Health and Environment, U.S. Department of Health and Human Services’ Public Health Service and U.S Fish and Wildlife Service say living in the area does not pose any significant risk.

An EPA Superfund Record of Decision dated June 3, 1997 stated that official radionuclide testing of the plant site following nearly a decade of plant inactivity showed topsoil sample levels safe enough to warrant discontinuation of further sampling. The report indicated that no remediation efforts would be required because building restrictions for lands in close proximity prevented new construction, and noted that "Continued suburban expansion is also anticipated in the area south and southeast of RFETS, primarily around Standley Lake, and in western Arvada along the 64th Street corridor."

=== W-470 and Jefferson Parkway ===
Critical to the final expansion and development of Candelas, notably the commercial sector of the community, is the development of the Jefferson Parkway. The proposed Parkway/toll road would require the transportation infrastructure be constructed north to south along the most eastern portion of the former plant site. The construction of the toll road has garnered concern over the disturbance of contaminated soil.

=== Prior Examples Affecting Property Values of the Surrounding Community ===
Property value declined during the Rocky Flats Advisory Notice period, in 1989, when the FBI and Department of Justice raided the plant, with nearby properties experiencing a significant degradation of property values.

Zillow's Home Value Index is currently at $826,278 and is forecasted to increase by 1.4% over the next year.

== Opposition to development ==
In the fall of 2013, attorneys for the land developers sent cease and desist requests to one activist, Michelle Gabrieloff-Parish, and the Rocky Mountain Peace and Justice Center after Gabrieloff-Parish criticized the Candelas development in interviews with local media outlets.

== See also ==
- Colorado Department of Health & Environment 1999 Report
- Radioactive contamination from the Rocky Flats Plant
- Kristen Iversen, author of Full Body Burden: Growing Up in the Nuclear Shadow of Rocky Flats
- Downwinders
