= Groupe INTRA =

Groupe INTRA is a French emergency response organization created by the French CEA, and the French nuclear companies Areva and EDF. It maintains a number of emergency intervention teams equipped with high-power radiation-hardened teleoperated mobile robots for intervention in nuclear accidents. INTRA is an acronym for "INTervention Robotique sur Accident", robotic intervention in accident.

As of March 2011, Groupe INTRA is shipping equipment to Japan to help with the Fukushima Daiichi nuclear accident.
