= Toulouse Space Centre =

RTD centre in France

- Centre spatial de Toulouse
- Entrance to the Toulouse Space Centre
- Abbreviation: CST
- Formation: September 1968
- Type: Research and development centre
- Location: Toulouse, France
- Coordinates: 43°33′43″N 1°28′54″E
- Official language: French
- Parent organisation: CNES

The Toulouse Space Centre (French: Centre spatial de Toulouse; CST: Occitan: Centre Espacial de Tolosa; CET) is a research and development centre of CNES. Founded in September 1968, it is located in the Rangueil-Lespinet district of Toulouse in the Haute-Garonne department in the Occitanie region in France. The largest national space center in Europe, CNES is haven to more than 1,700 employees, responsible for the development of most of the work, with the exception of launch vehicles and their launches.

== See also ==
- Cité de l'espace – French theme park about spaceflight
- French space program
- Guiana Space Centre – French and European spaceport in French Guiana
