= Pascal Elleaume =

French physicist

- Born: 1956; Sousse, Tunisia
- Died: 2011 (aged 54–55)
- Education: Ecole Normale Superieure
- Known for: Insertion device Free-electron laser
- Scientific career
- Workplaces: ESRF; CEA

Pascal Elleaume (1956–2011) was a French physicist and a pioneer in the field of synchrotron radiation and synchrotron light sources, where his work on radiations from insertion device was pivotal. Pascal died in 2011.

== Education and career ==
Elleaume studied at the Ecole Normale Superieure in Paris, France, where he completed his PhD on turbulence in Helium and obtained his agrégation in 1978. After completing his PhD, he became a visiting scholar at Berkeley for a year, then joined the French Alternative Energies and Atomic Energy Commission (CEA), where he started working on Free-electron lasers with Yves Petroff. He joined the European Synchrotron Radiation Facility (ESRF) in 1986, where he became the director of the accelerator division.

== Life and family ==
Pascal married in October 1992 and had three children. Pascal died in the French Alps in 2011 in an avalanche.
