= Len Ackland =

American journalist

- Born: Len Earl Ackland; 1944 (age 81–82)
- Education: University of Colorado Boulder; Johns Hopkins University (MA)
- Occupations: Journalist; Editor; Professor
- Employers: Chicago Tribune; Des Moines Register; University of Colorado Boulder
- Writing career
- Genre: Journalism
- Notable work: Making a Real Killing (1999)
- Notable awards: George Polk Award (1987); Guggenheim Fellowship (2008)

Len Earl Ackland (born 1944) is a journalist and retired journalism professor from the University of Colorado Boulder. He was founding director of the Center for Environmental Journalism in 1992.

He graduated from the University of Colorado Boulder with a bachelor's degree in history, and from the Johns Hopkins University School of Advanced International Studies with a Master's degree. He was a humanitarian worker, RAND researcher and freelance writer during the Vietnam War in 1967-68. He was a reporter for the Chicago Tribune and the Des Moines Register, where he won The George Polk Award in 1978 for a series on discriminatory mortgage lending, or "redlining." He was editor of the Bulletin of the Atomic Scientists when it won the 1987 National Magazine Award for a special issue on the Chernobyl nuclear accident. In 1991 he joined the faculty of the University of Colorado Boulder. He is a member of the Unitarian Universalist Church of Boulder.

== Awards ==
- 2008 Guggenheim Fellowship
- 1990 John D. and Catherine T. MacArthur Foundation research and writing grant
- 1987 National Magazine Award, as editor
- 1978 George Polk Award
- 1988 honorary Doctor of Humane Letters from the Meadville Lombard Theological School in Chicago.

== Works ==
- Making a Real Killing: Rocky Flats and the Nuclear West University of New Mexico Press, 1999, ISBN 978-0-8263-1877-0; 2002, ISBN 978-0-8263-2798-7
- Credibility gap: a digest of the Pentagon papers, National Peace Literature Service, 1972
- "Assessing the Nuclear Age", co-editor, Educational Foundation for Nuclear Science, 1986
- "Why Are We Still in Vietnam", co-editor, Random House, 1970
