= Issus Aussaguel =

Coordinates: 43°25′44″N 1°29′52″E

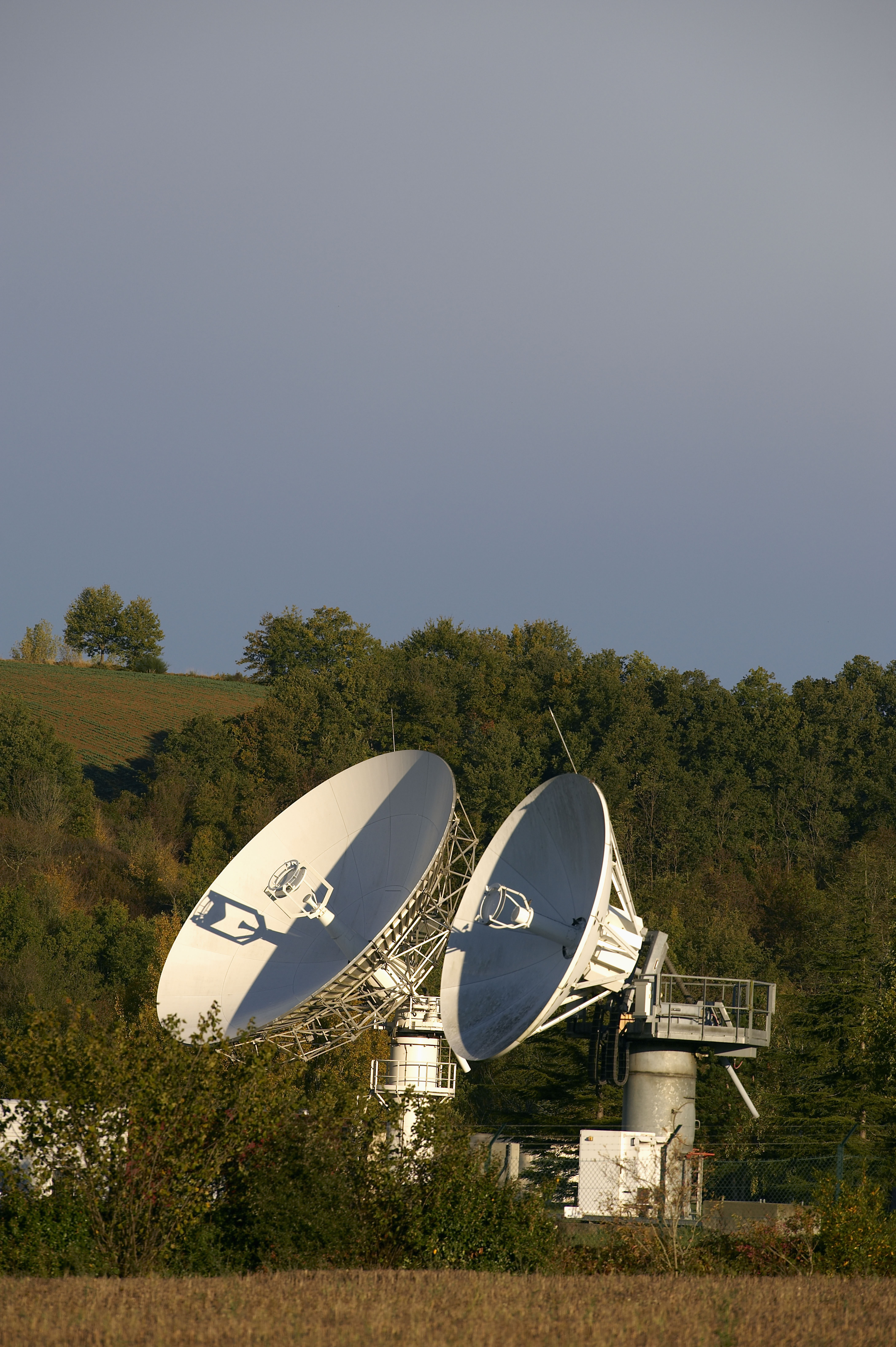
Issus Aussaguel

Issus-Aussaguel Station is a ground station for communication with spacecraft operated by the Centre National d'Études Spatiales (CNES). It is located near Toulouse, France.
