= François Jacq =

French engineer and public administrator

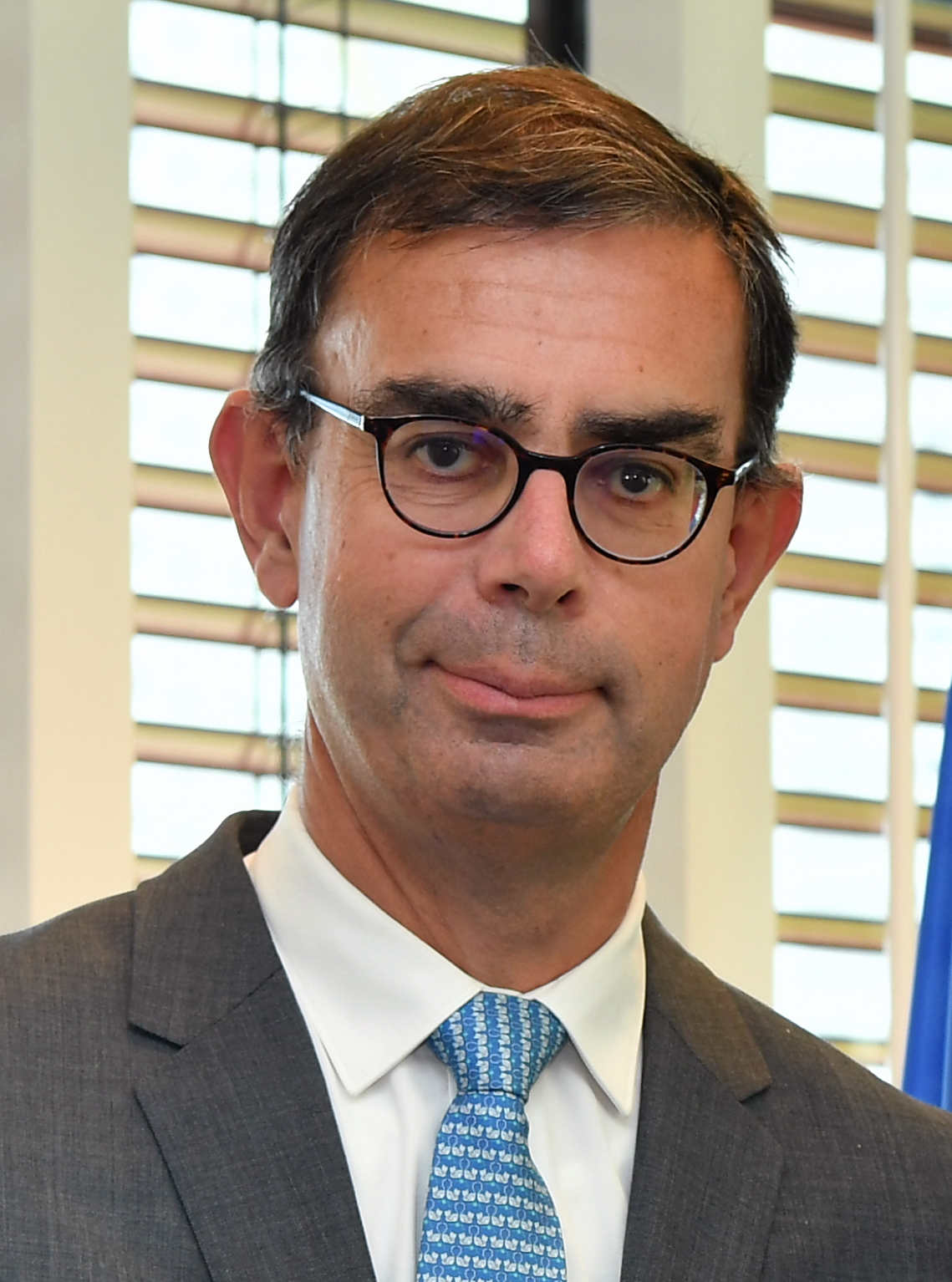
- Born: October 28, 1965 (age 60); France
- Education: École Polytechnique
- Occupations: Engineer, Administrator
- Known for: President of the CNES (proposed), Administrator General of the CEA

François Jacq (born 1965) is a French engineer and public administrator known for his leadership roles in scientific and technological organizations. In March 2025, French President Emmanuel Macron proposed Jacq as the president of the board of directors of the Centre National d'Études Spatiales (CNES), France's national space agency.

== Early life and education ==
François Jacq was born in 1965 in France. He graduated from the prestigious École Polytechnique, where he trained as an engineer, laying the foundation for his career in science and technology administration.

== Career ==
Jacq has held significant positions in French public administration. Since April 2018, he has served as the Administrator General of the Commissariat à l'énergie atomique et aux énergies alternatives (CEA), France's atomic and alternative energy commission, and he became the president of its board of directors in November 2019. His tenure at the CEA focused on advancing energy research and technology.

On March 26, 2025, President Emmanuel Macron put forward Jacq's name to lead the CNES, succeeding Philippe Baptiste, who had transitioned to a ministerial role. The nomination requires approval from the French National Assembly and Senate, as outlined in the French Constitution. If confirmed, Jacq would oversee France's space research and exploration efforts.

== Honors and Awards ==
- Officer of the Order of Legion of Honour
- Officer of the Ordre National du Mérite
