= French Alternative Energies and Atomic Energy Commission =

French research organisation

- Commissariat à l'énergie atomique et aux énergies alternatives

Agency overview
- Formed: 18 October 1945; 80 years ago by Charles de Gaulle
- Preceding agency: Commissariat à l'énergie atomique
- Headquarters: Paris and Gif-sur-Yvette, France
- Employees: 21,000+ (2022)
- Annual budget: €5.8 billion (2022)
- Agency executives: François Jacq, General administrator; Patrick Landais, High Commissioner for Atomic Energy
- Website: cea.fr (en)

The French Alternative Energies and Atomic Energy Commission (CEA) (French: Commissariat à l'énergie atomique et aux énergies alternatives) is a French public government-funded research organisation in the areas of energy, defense and security, information technologies and health technologies. The CEA maintains a cross-disciplinary culture of engineers and researchers, building on the synergies between fundamental and technological research.

CEA is headed by a board headed by the general administrator (currently François Jacq since 20 April 2018), advised by the high-commissioner for atomic energy (currently Patrick Landais). Its yearly budget amounts to €5.8 billion and its permanent staff is slightly over 21,000 persons.

== History ==
CEA was created in 1945; since then, the successive high-commissioners have been Frédéric Joliot-Curie, Francis Perrin, Jacques Yvon, Jean Teillac, Raoul Dautry, René Pellat, Bernard Bigot, Catherine Cesarsky, Daniel Verwaerde, and François Jacq.

In December 2009, French President Nicolas Sarkozy declared that CEA should change its name from Commissariat à l’énergie atomique (English: Commission for Atomic Energy) to Commissariat à l’énergie atomique et aux énergies alternatives (English: Commission for Atomic Energy and Alternative Energies); this change took effect on 10 March 2010, when the decision was published in the Journal officiel de la République française.

== Research ==
It conducts fundamental and applied research into many areas, including the design of nuclear reactors, the manufacturing of integrated circuits, the use of radionucleides for curing illnesses, seismology and tsunami propagation, the safety of computerized systems, etc.

It has one of the top 100 supercomputers in the world, the Tera-100. TERA 100, first system designed and built in Europe to reach the petaflops in 2010, was ranked in 5th position in the worldwide TOP 500. CEA is now building TERA-1000 which is a key step in the implementation of their Exascale program for the computing needs that CEA would face by 2020.

In March 2016, Reuters published an article describing the "Top 25 Global Innovators – Government" and placed CEA as "number one" amongst "The World's Most Innovative Research Institutions."

== Organisation ==
CEA is divided into four directorates, or divisions:

=== Energies division (DES) ===
The direction des énergies (DES) comprises four institutes:

- Institut de recherche sur les systèmes nucléaires pour la production d’énergie bas carbone (IRESNE), in Cadarache
- Institut des sciences et technologies pour une économie circulaire des énergies bas carbone (ISEC), in Marcoule
- Institut des sciences appliquées et de la simulation pour les énergies bas carbone (ISAS), in CEA Saclay
- Institut de technico-économie des systèmes énergétiques (ITESE or I-Tésé)

=== Technological research division (DRT) ===
The direction de la recherche technologique (DRT), known also as CEA Tech division, is divided between two CEA sites, at Saclay and Grenoble. CEA Tech focuses on technological research and development in the field of energy, IT (both hardware and software) and healthcare informatics. It plays an active role in transferring knowledge and research to industry.

The CEA Tech division is further divided into three research institutes:

- The CEA-Leti lab works mainly on micro/nano technologies and specializes in microsystems, biotech, photonics and nanoelectronics. It is located mainly in Grenoble, France.
- The CEA-List lab works mainly on systems and software-intensive technology and specializes in embedded systems, sensors and big data, and advanced manufacturing. It is located mainly in Paris-Saclay, France.
- The CEA-Liten lab works mainly on cutting edge technologies related to energy and nanomaterials. It specializes in building solar, carbon-free transports, biomass-hydrogen and nano materials-nanotechnologies.

The current director of DRT since january 2023 is Julie Galland.

=== Fundamental research division (DRF) ===
The direction de la recherche fondamentale (DRF) consists of 9 institutes:

- Institut de biologie François Jacob (JACOB) in CEA Fontenay-aux-Roses
- Institut des sciences du vivant Frédéric Joliot (JOLIOT) in CEA Saclay
- Institut Rayonnement-Matière de Saclay (IRAMIS) in CEA Saclay
- Institut de recherche sur les lois fondamentales de l'Univers (Irfu) in CEA Saclay
- Laboratoire des sciences du climat et de l'environnement (LSCE) in CEA Saclay
- Institut de recherche interdisciplinaire de Grenoble (IRIG) in CEA Grenoble
- Institut de physique théorique (IPhT) in CEA Saclay
- Institut de Recherche sur la Fusion par confinement Magnétique (IRFM) in Cadarache
- Institut de Biosciences et de Biotechnologies d'Aix-Marseille (BIAM) in Cadarache

The current DRF director since 25 August 2025 is François Daviaud.

=== Military applications division (DAM) ===
The direction des applications militaires (DAM) builds the nuclear weapons of the French military and designs the power plants for the nuclear submarines of the French Navy.

== Facilities ==
=== Civilian research centres ===
- CEA Saclay, Essonne (48.725135°N 2.150346°E, headquarters since 2006) and the associated National Laboratory GANIL at Caen - Calvados
- CEA Fontenay-aux-Roses, Fontenay-aux-Roses, Hauts-de-Seine
- CEA Grenoble, Grenoble (Polygone Scientifique), Isère
- CEA Cadarache, Cadarache, Bouches-du-Rhône
- CEA Valrhô, Marcoule and Pierrelatte, Gard

=== Civilian emergency organizations ===
- Groupe INTRA

=== Research centres for military applications ===
The sites of the DAM include:

- CEA DAM Île-de-France (DIF), Bruyères-le-Châtel, Essonne
- CEA Valduc, Côte-d'Or
- INBS PN CADARACHE, in Cadarache
- CEA Cesta, Gironde
- CEA Gramat
- CEA Le Ripault, Indre-et-Loire

== Spin-off companies ==
CEA has spun off multiple companies, some being partial subsidiaries or where CEA has minority interest. Some such companies are listed below:

- Orano
- STMicroelectronics
- Soitec
- LYNRED (formerly Sofradir)
- It owned Areva
- Kalray

== CEA in Academics ==
=== University of Paris-Saclay ===
CEA has played an active role in research, development and innovation in the four main areas of low-carbon energies (nuclear and renewable), technologies for information and health technologies, very large research infrastructures (TGIR), and defense and global security.

Moreover, two of the ten CEA centers across France have joined with the University of Paris-Saclay to develop high quality research and training. The centers which form a part of the University of Paris-Saclay include:

- CEA Saclay Center, which conducts research mainly in areas related to climate and environment, materials science, nuclear energy, life sciences and technological research
- CEA Fontenay-aux-Roses Center, which conducts research and innovation in areas related to imaging and biomedical technologies

(Since 2017, these two centers merged into CEA Paris-Saclay center, and are now referred to as sites in that center.)

The CEA researchers involved in the University of Paris-Saclay represent over 20% of the university's research potential, particularly in the field of physics and engineering. CEA maintains a strong presence in training to master and engineer level by administering INSTN, wherein various courses are taught by its researchers.

CEA has around 400 researchers who hold an accreditation to supervise research, making it a significant contributor to the research and doctoral programs of the University Paris-Saclay.

=== INSTN ===
The INSTN, Institut national des sciences et techniques nucléaires (National Institute for Nuclear Science and Technology) is a public higher education institution administered by the CEA (French Atomic Energy and Alternative Energies Commission) under the joint authority of the Ministry of National Education, Higher Education and Research, the Ministry of the Economy, Industry and the Digital Sector and the Ministry of the Environment, Energy and Marine Affairs.

=== Others ===
- Atos, ENS Paris-Saclay and CEA launched an academic partnership in 2016.

== See also ==
- GANIL (laboratory shared between the CEA and the CNRS)
- Groupe INTRA
- Laser Mégajoule
- Pascal Elleaume
- Nuclear waste management in France
