= Making a Real Killing =

1999 book by Len Ackland

- Author: Len Ackland
- Genre: History
- Publisher: University of New Mexico Press
- Publication date: 1999
- Pages: 308
- ISBN: 9780826318770

Making a Real Killing: Rocky Flats and the Nuclear West is a 1999 book by Len Ackland. Ackland draws on information obtained from governmental sources, federal contractors, personal interviews, and newspaper articles to form a multi-layered history about the controversial Rocky Flats nuclear facility. The book also explores the creation and collapse of the nuclear weapons complex in the United States.

Reviews of Making a Real Killing have been published in Environmental History and Pacific Historical Review.

Len Ackland is the former editor of the Bulletin of the Atomic Scientists and director for environmental journalism at the University of Colorado at Boulder.

== See also ==
- Dark Circle, an award-winning PBS documentary
- List of books about nuclear issues
- List of anti-nuclear protests in the United States
- Radioactive contamination from the Rocky Flats Plant
