= Carl J. Johnson =

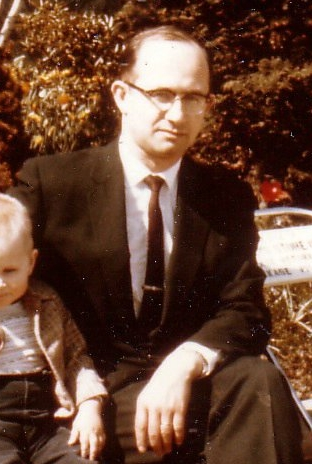
- Born: Carl Jean Johnson; July 2, 1929; Marion, Indiana
- Died: December 29, 1988 (aged 59); Lakewood, Colorado
- Occupation: Physician
- Spouse: Kathryn Van Deusen

Carl Jean Johnson (July 2, 1929 – December 29, 1988) was a public health physician who opposed nuclear testing.

== Birth and marriage ==
Carl Johnson was born in Sims, Indiana on July 2, 1929, to Fredrick Chancy Johnson and Enabel Routh. He had siblings George, Derrold and Sarah. He was raised in Grant County, Indiana. At age 12 he came down with tuberculosis, and though he overcame the sickness his growth was stunted. He began a strict weightlifting regimen and developed proper eating habits that allowed him to overcome his physical weakness. At least once in his later life, he would have to have cysts from the tuberculosis infection removed. Carl married Kathryn Van Deusen (1923–2005). Kathryn was the daughter of Emmett Peter Van Deusen I (1878–1965) and Margaret McKenzie Barton (1885–1963).

== US Army and education ==
He entered service in the United States Army on July 3, 1946. As a corporal, he was stationed in Guam as a surveyor. It was largely an uneventful tour of duty, with the exception of while surveying the island's jungles he found a wrecked bomber from World War II that still had the pilot's remains inside. He was discharged from Army service on March 18, 1949. He later became an Army Reservist and attained the rank of colonel. He went to Michigan State University and the Ohio State University College of Medicine. He had a master's degree in public health from the University of California, Berkeley.

== Rocky Flats ==
In 1976 he was the Director of the Jefferson County, Colorado Department of Health. He reported that soil around the Rocky Flats Plant contained 44 times more plutonium than the government claimed. In 1977 he reported higher-than-average rates of leukemia and cancer among the local people. In 1980 he reported that plant workers had eight times more brain tumors than expected. In 1981 he was fired. In 1985 he lost an election to become the Boulder County, Colorado Director of Health. He later filed a whistleblower lawsuit against Jefferson County, Colorado. After the Colorado State Supreme Court inverted in the case, Johnson's attorney stated in a second lawsuit that the original trail judge said "It would not be good for Carl Johnson to get his job back. In fact it would be a disaster." The judge responded by saying this statement was taken out of context and he thought it would be bad for Johnson because the Board of Health no longer wanted him there.

== Death and burial ==
Johnson died on December 29, 1988, at Lutheran Memorial Hospital in Lakewood, Colorado, of complications following coronary bypass surgery. He was buried in the Fort Logan National Cemetery in Colorado on January 3, 1989.

== Publications ==
- Carl J. Johnson, "Funding of Radiation Protection Standards Research", letter to the editor, American Journal of Public Health, February 1979.
- Carl J. Johnson, "Cancer Incidence in an Area of Radioactive Fallout Downwind from the Nevada Test Site", Journal of the American Medical Association, Volume 251, Number 2, January 13, 1984.
- Carl J. Johnson, "Rocky Flats: Death Inc." 'The New York Times', Op-Ed; Sunday, December 18, 1988, Op-ed E-23.

== Images ==
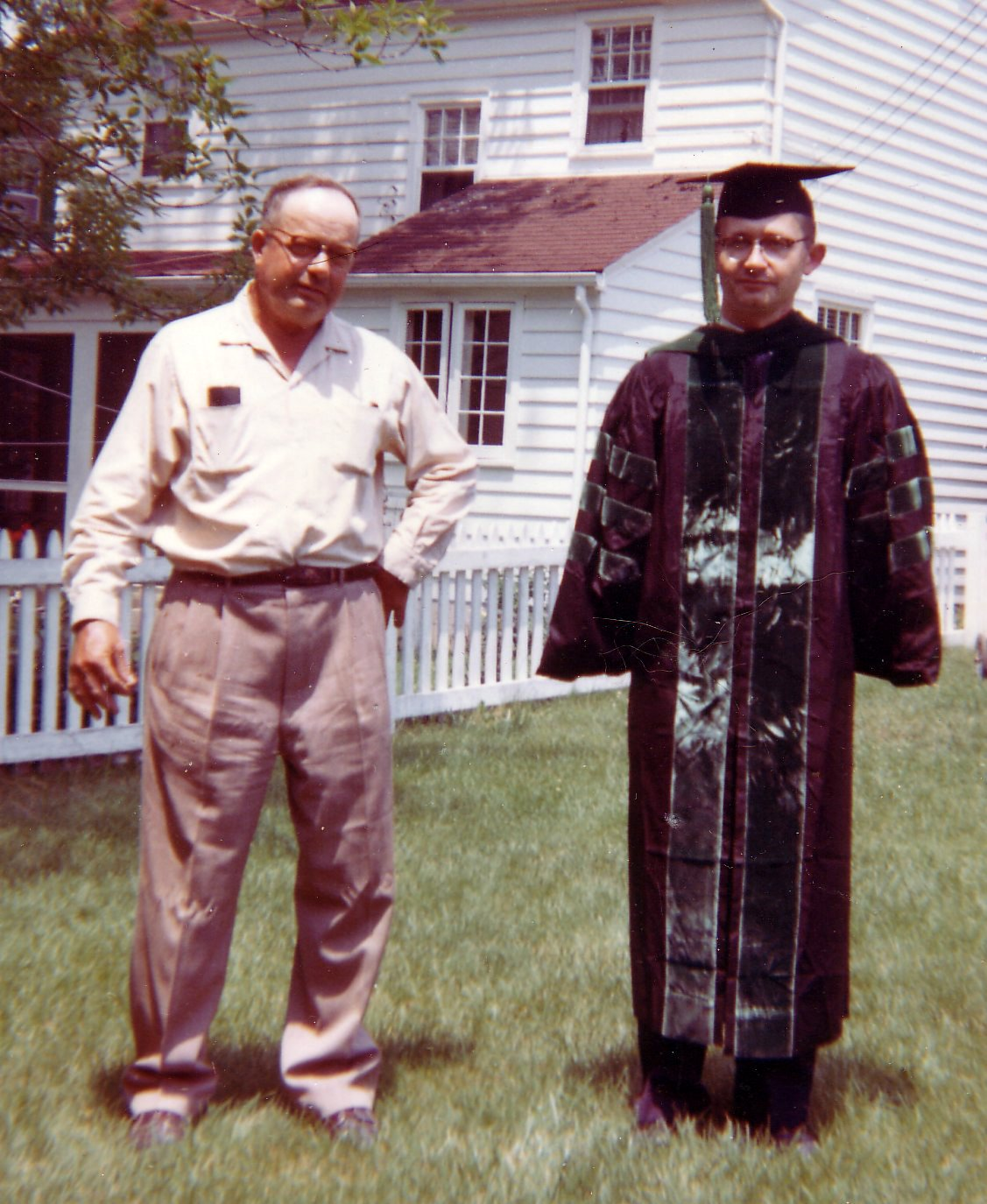
Fredrick Chancy Johnson (1902 − c. 1975) (left) and Carl J. Johnson (1929−1988) (right)

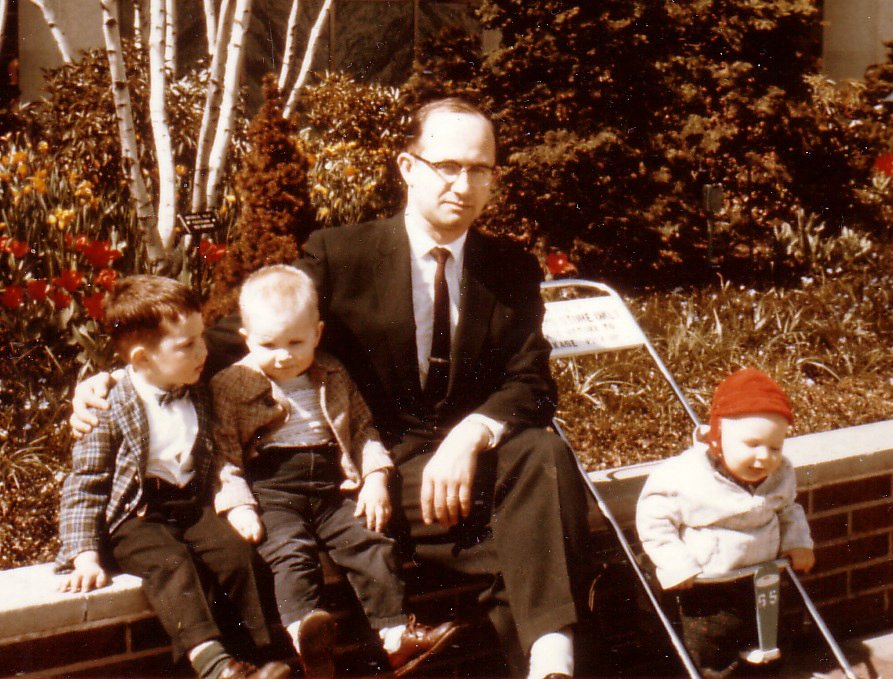
Carl J. Johnson (1929−1988)

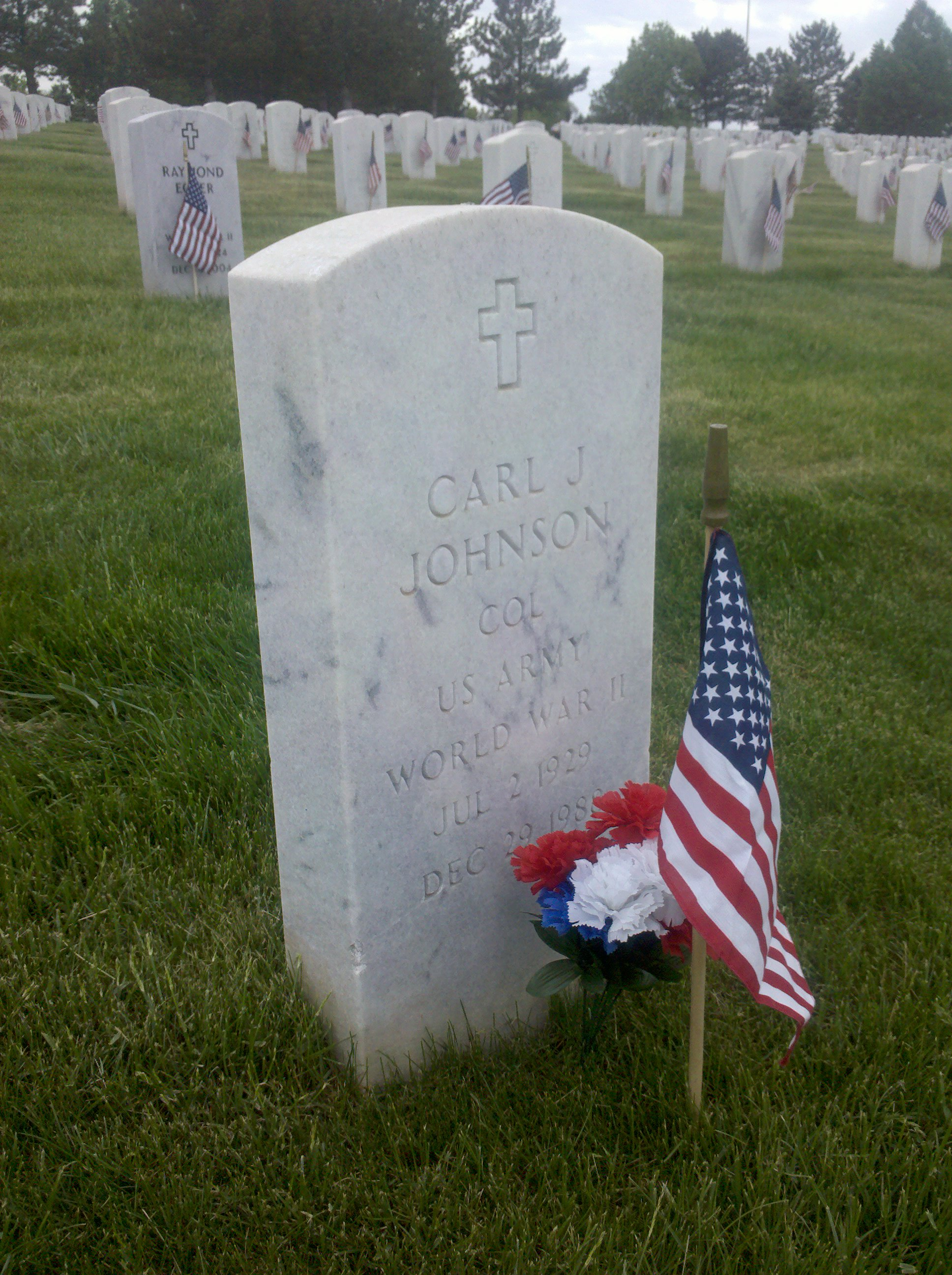
Gravesite at Fort Logan
