= List of nuclear and radiation fatalities by country =

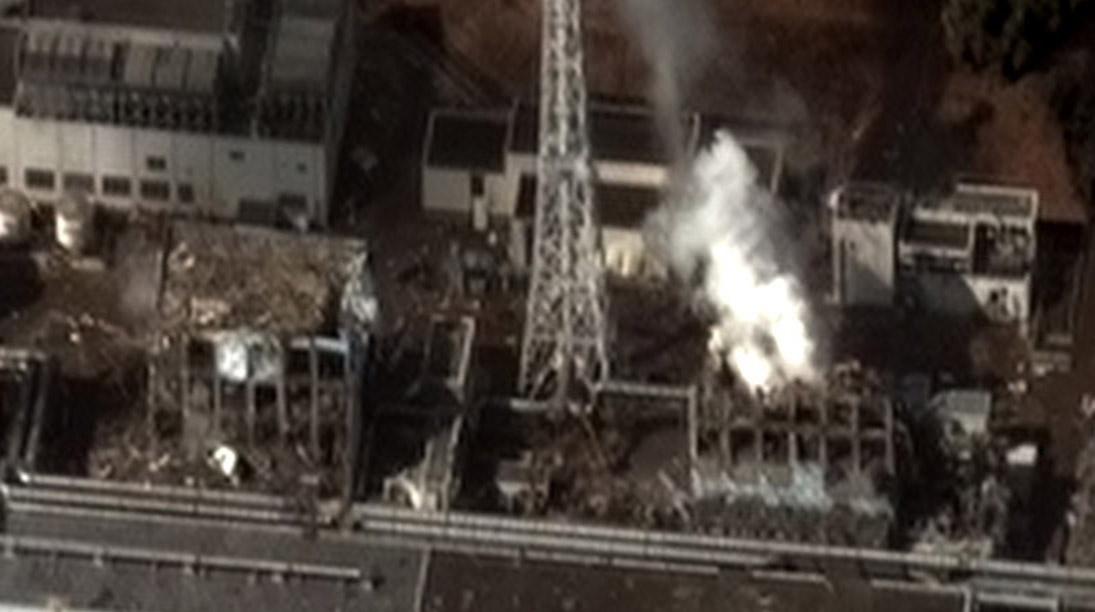
The 2011 Fukushima Daiichi nuclear disaster, the worst nuclear accident in 25 years, displaced 50,000 households after radiation leaked into the air, soil and sea.

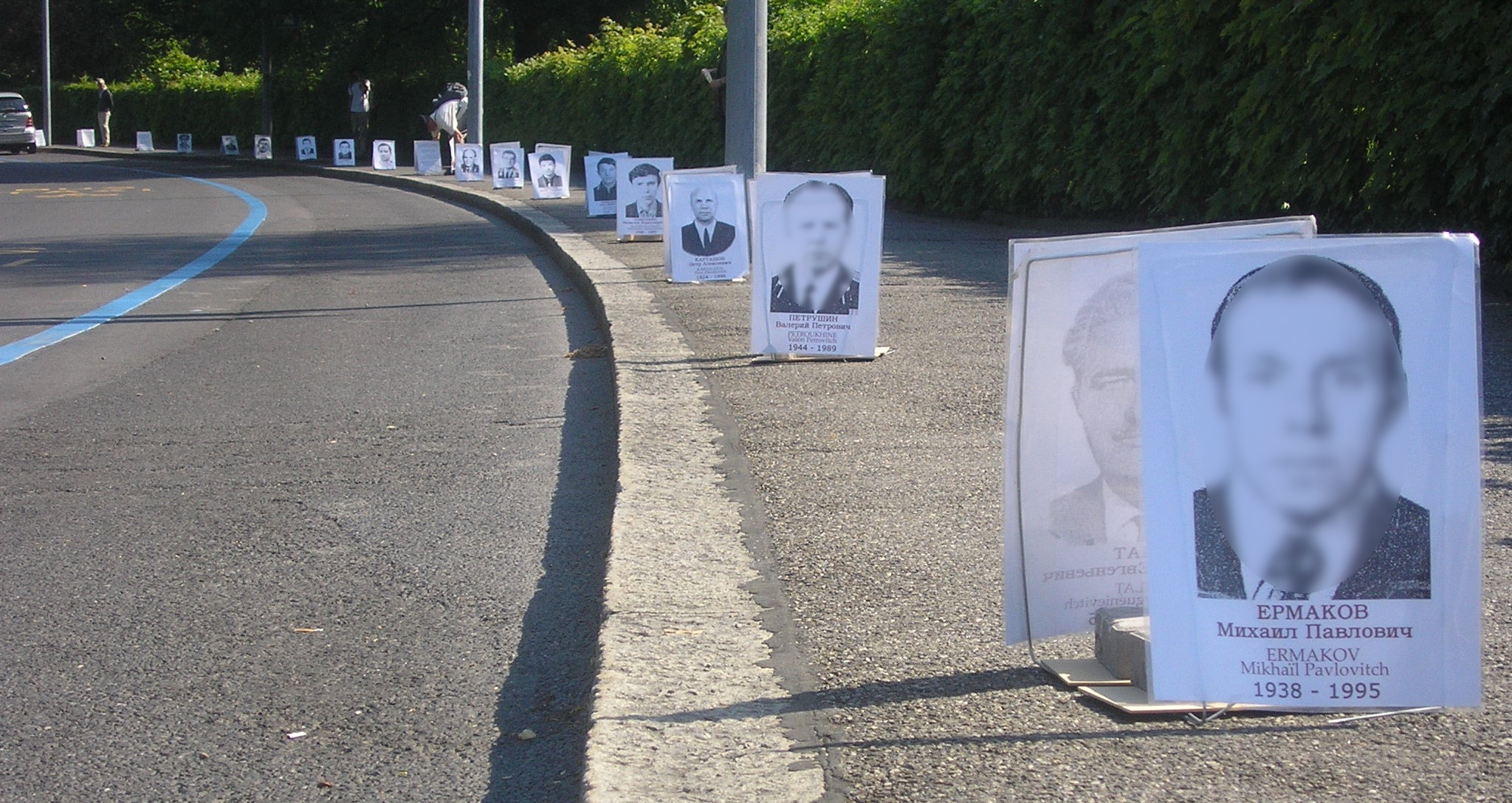
Deceased Liquidators' portraits used for an anti-nuclear power protest in Geneva.

This is a partial list of nuclear and radiation fatalities by country. Not all fatal incidents are included, and not all included incidents were fatal.

This list only reports the proximate confirmed human deaths and does not go into detail about ecological, environmental or long-term effects such as birth defects or permanent loss of habitable land.

== Brazil ==
- September 13, 1987 – Goiania accident. Four fatalities and 320 other people received serious radiation contamination.

== Costa Rica ==
- 1996 – Radiotherapy accident in Costa Rica. Thirteen fatalities and 114 other patients received an overdose of radiation.

== Estonia ==
- October, 1994 - Theft of radioactive material in Tammiku. The accident resulted in the death of one person (and death of one dog) and injury to a number of others.

== Greenland ==
- January 21, 1968 – Thule accident.

== India ==
- April 2010 – Mayapuri radiological accident. One fatality.

== Japan ==
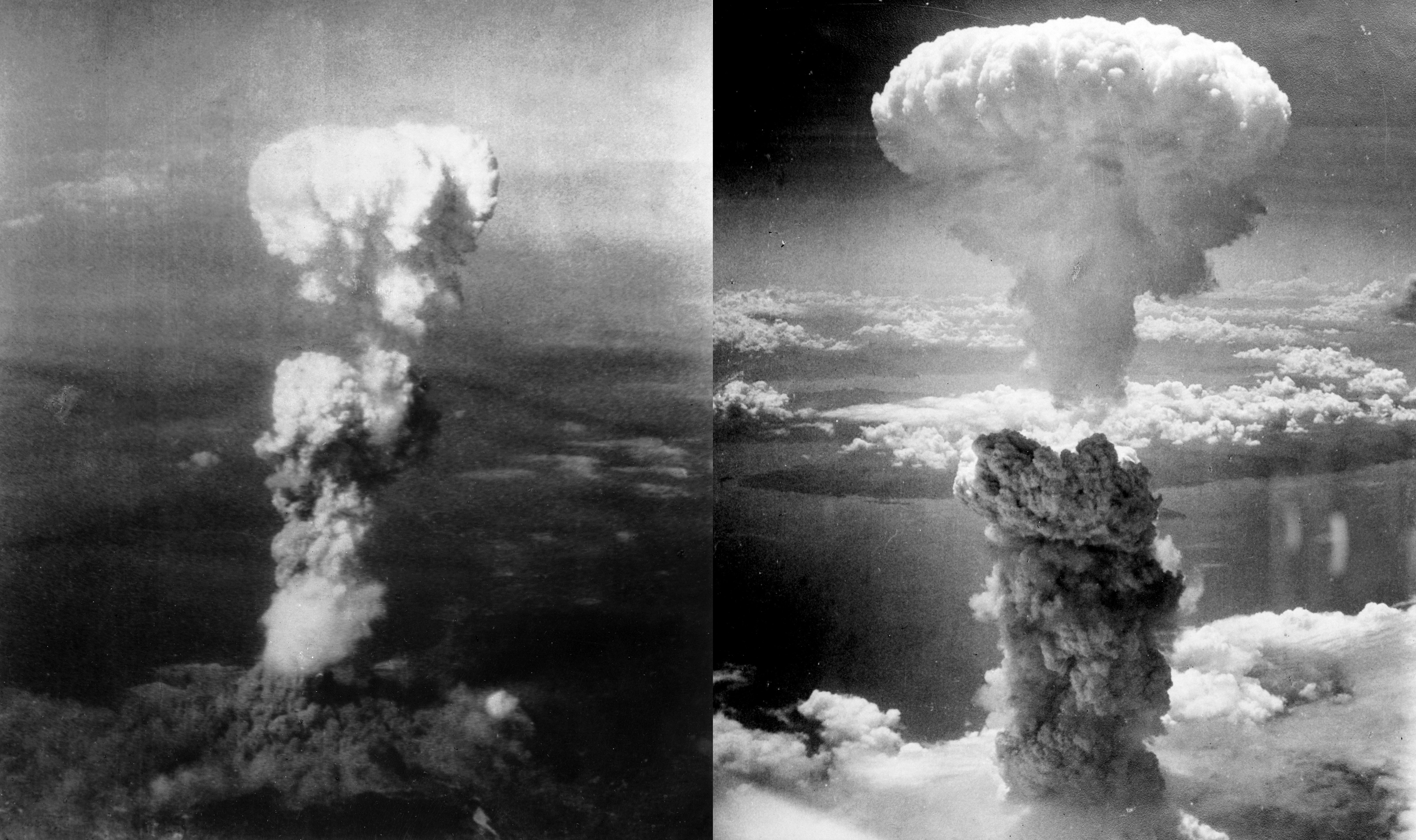
- Hiroshima (left) and Nagasaki (right) after detonation of both weapons on August 6, and 9.
  August 6, 1945 - Atomic bombing of Hiroshima, 70,000~140,000 fatalities by the end of 1945. Radioactive black rain rained down on the city, causing many to be irradiated to levels that were fatal within weeks.
- August 9, 1945 - Atomic bombing of Nagasaki, 70,000~100,000 fatalities by the end of 1945. many fell ill due to fallout and died within weeks similarly to those in Hiroshima.
- March 1, 1954 – Daigo Fukuryū Maru, one fatality. A Japanese tuna fishing boat with a crew of 23 men which was contaminated by nuclear fallout from the United States Castle Bravo thermonuclear weapon test at Bikini Atoll on March 1, 1954, due to miscalculation of the bomb's explosive yield.
- 1965 Philippine Sea A-4 crash – where a Skyhawk attack aircraft with a nuclear weapon in US-occupied Okinawa fell into the sea. The pilot, the aircraft, and the B43 nuclear bomb were never recovered. It was not until the 1980s that the Pentagon revealed the loss of the one-megaton bomb.
- September 30, 1999 – Tokaimura nuclear accident, nuclear fuel reprocessing plant, two fatalities.
- August 9, 2004 – Mihama Nuclear Power Plant accident. Hot water and steam leaked from a broken pipe. The accident was the worst nuclear disaster of Japan up until that time, excluding Hiroshima and Nagasaki. Five fatalities.
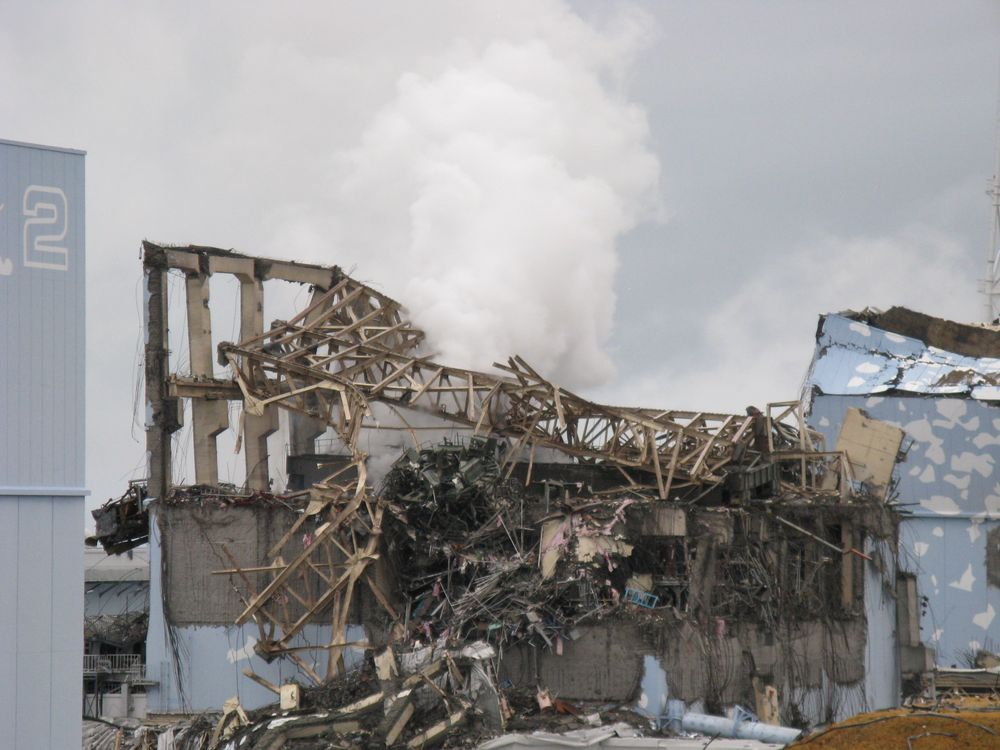
  Unit 3 of the Fukushima Nuclear Power Plant, with its structural integrity exposed and deformed.
- March 11, 2011 - Fukushima Daiichi Nuclear Disaster, caused after the 3/11 earthquake and its subsequent tsunami that damaged the reactors, resulting in a hydrogen explosion. one fatality four years after the disaster, suspected cause of death is cancer. Many locals had to evacuate after the disaster due to radiation. The area of the nuclear power plant is now the difficult to return zone, because of the high levels of radioactivity. a massive clean up project also took place, that is still ongoing.

== Mexico ==
- 1962 – Radiation accident in Mexico City, four fatalities.

== Morocco ==
- March 1984 – Radiation accident in Morocco, eight fatalities.

== Panama ==
- August 2000 to March 2001 – Instituto Oncologico Nacional of Panama; 17 patients receiving treatment for prostate cancer and cancer of the cervix received lethal doses of radiation.

== Soviet Union/Russia ==
- September 29, 1957 – Kyshtym disaster, Mayak nuclear waste storage tank explosion at Chelyabinsk. Two hundred plus fatalities and this figure is a conservative estimate; 270,000 people were exposed to dangerous radiation levels. Over thirty small communities had been removed from Soviet maps between 1958 and 1991. (INES level 6).
- July 4, 1961 – Soviet submarine K-19 accident. Eight fatalities and more than 30 people were over-exposed to radiation.
- May 24, 1968 – Soviet submarine K-27 accident. Nine fatalities and 83 people were injured.
- 5 October 1982 – Lost radiation source, Baku, Azerbaijan, USSR. Five fatalities and 13 injuries.
- August 10, 1985 – Soviet submarine K-431 accident. Ten fatalities and 49 other people suffered radiation injuries.
- April 26, 1986 – Chernobyl disaster. See below in the section on Ukraine. In 1986, the Ukrainian SSR was part of the Soviet Union.
- 1 November 2006 – assassination of Alexander Litvinenko by exposure to Polonium-210.

== Spain ==
- January 17, 1966 – 1966 Palomares B-52 crash.
- December 1990 – Radiotherapy accident in Zaragoza. Eleven fatalities and 27 other patients were injured.
- April 4, 2007 – Radioactive leakage in C.N. Ascó I (Ascó - Tarragona).

== Thailand ==
- February 2000 – Three deaths and ten injuries resulted in Samut Prakarn when a radiation-therapy unit was dismantled.

== Ukraine ==
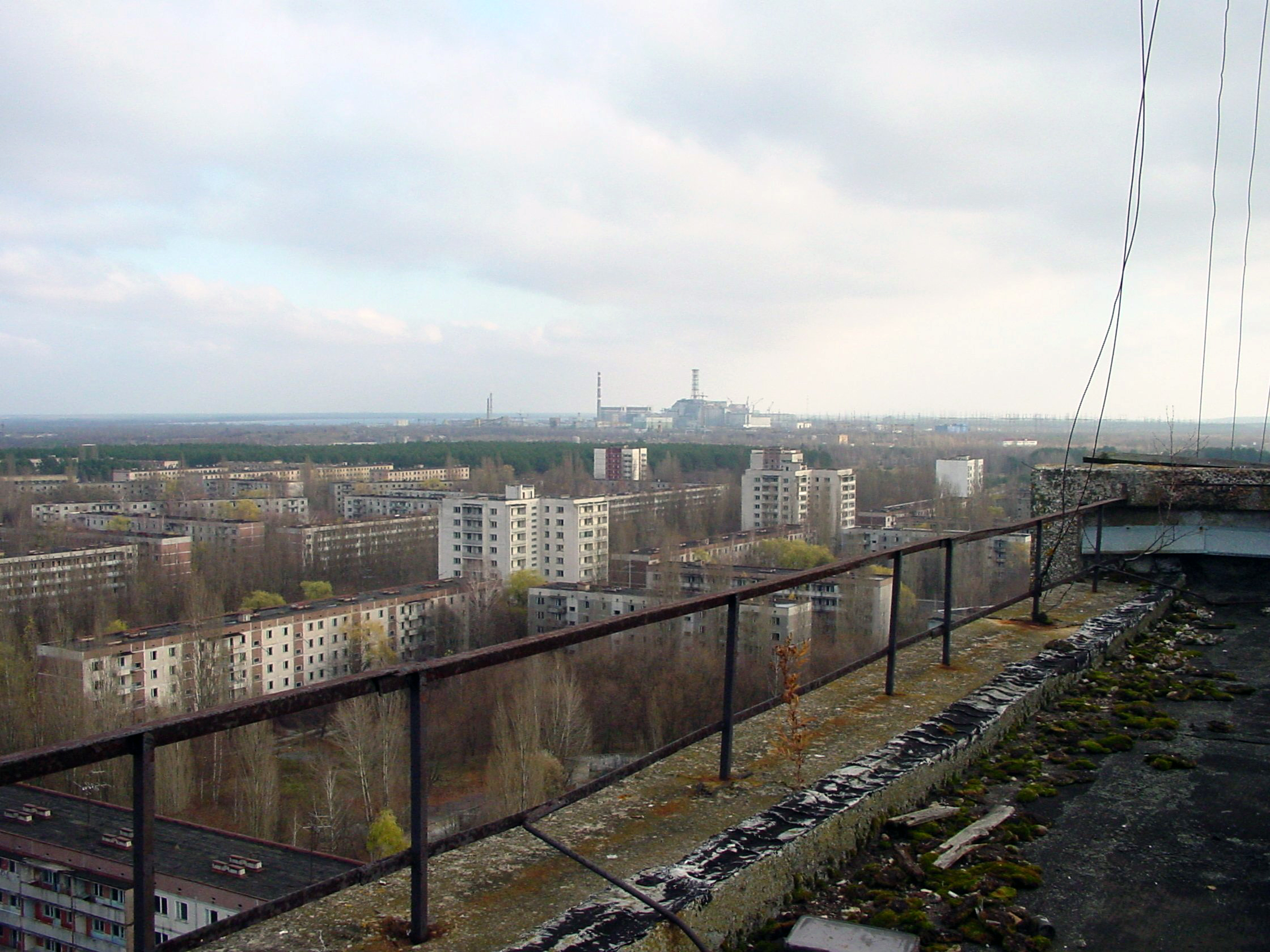
The abandoned city of Pripyat, Ukraine with the Chernobyl nuclear power plant in the distance.

- April 26, 1986 – Chernobyl disaster. There is rough agreement that a total of either 31 or 54 people died from blast trauma or acute radiation syndrome (ARS) as a direct result of the disaster.

== United Kingdom ==
- October 8, 1957 – Windscale fire ignites plutonium piles and contaminates surrounding dairy farms, 100 to 240 cancer deaths.

== United States ==
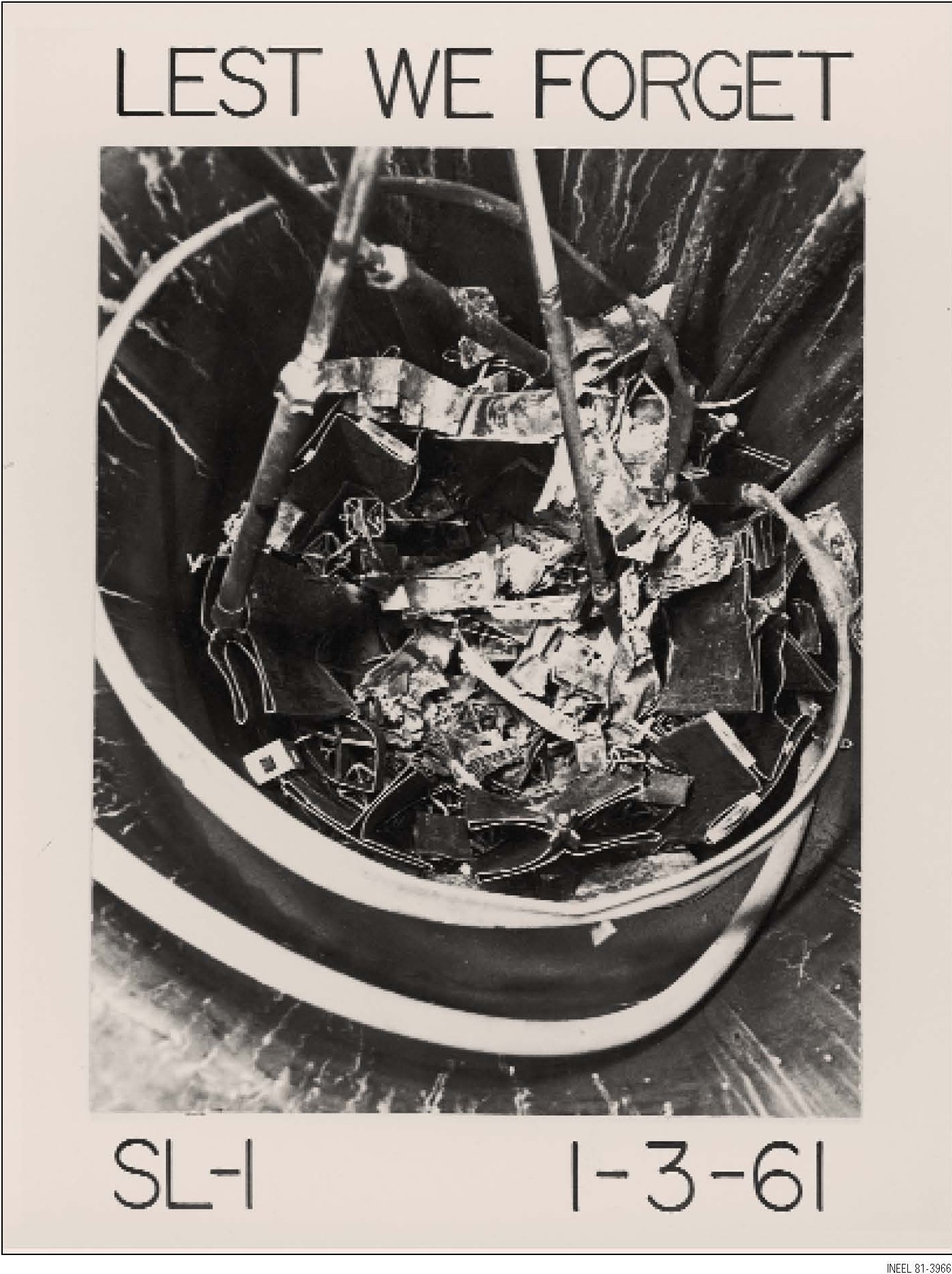
- This image of the SL-1 core served as a reminder of deaths and damage that a nuclear meltdown can cause.
  August 21, 1945 – Harry Daghlian died at Los Alamos National Laboratory in New Mexico.
- May 21, 1946 – Louis Slotin died.
- December 30, 1958 – Cecil Kelley criticality accident, at the Los Alamos National Laboratory.
- 1961 – (US Army) SL-1 accident resulted in three fatalities.
- 1964- Wood River Jct. Rhode Island. Robert D. Peabody – according to the Nuclear Regulatory Commission, Robert Peabody was the U.S. nuclear industry's first and last fatality due to acute radiation syndrome.
- 1974-1976 – Columbus radiotherapy accident, 10 deaths and 88 injuries.
- 1980 – Houston radiotherapy accident, 7 deaths.
- 1981 – Douglas Crofut died.

== See also ==
- Atomic bombings of Hiroshima and Nagasaki
- Lists of nuclear disasters and radioactive incidents
- Nuclear and radiation accidents
- Nuclear power accidents by country
- Nevada Test Site
- Radium Girls
- Semipalatinsk Test Site
