= Kurregion Elbe-Heideland =

Coordinates: 51°41′N 12°44′E

Kurregion Elbe-Heideland was a Verwaltungsgemeinschaft ("administrative community") in the district of Wittenberg, in Saxony-Anhalt, Germany. It was situated on the left bank of the Elbe, southeast of Wittenberg. It was disbanded in July 2009. The seat of the Verwaltungsgemeinschaft was Bad Schmiedeberg.

The Verwaltungsgemeinschaft Kurregion Elbe-Heideland consisted of the following municipalities:

- Bad Schmiedeberg
- Korgau
- Meuro
- Pretzsch
- Priesitz
- Schnellin
- Söllichau
- Trebitz
