= Söllichau =

- Stadtteil of Bad Schmiedeberg
- Interactive map of Söllichau
- Location within Germany Location within Saxony-Anhalt
- Coordinates: 51°38′N 12°38′E
- Country: Germany
- State: Saxony-Anhalt
- District: Wittenberg
- Town: Bad Schmiedeberg

Area
  - Total: 16.68 km^{2} (6.44 sq mi)
- Elevation: 130 m (430 ft)

Population (2006-12-31)
  - Total: 917
  - Density: 55.0/km^{2} (142/sq mi)
- Time zone: UTC+01:00 (CET)
  - Summer (DST): UTC+02:00 (CEST)
- Postal codes: 06774
- Dialling codes: 034243
- Vehicle registration: WB
- Website: www.bad-schmiedeberg.de

Söllichau is a village and a former municipality in Wittenberg district in Saxony-Anhalt, Germany. Since 1 July 2009, it is part of the town Bad Schmiedeberg. It is situated between the small towns of Bad Düben and Bad Schmiedeberg, in the middle of the Düben Heath. The former municipality had one constituent centre, die Gleinermühle.

== History ==
Söllichau had its first documentary mention in 1346. The area had, however, been inhabited much earlier by Germanic tribes, and by the sixth century, by Slavs. Hence comes the name Söllichau, which has its roots in the Slavic name "Zelichow" ("Lord Zelich's Place"). After being conquered by the German kings, the area was settled by Flemish farmers. Until 1815, Söllichau belonged to Saxony and was jurisdictionally and for taxation purposes subordinate to the Amt of Düben and thereby also to the Leipzig district. As a result of the Congress of Vienna, Söllichau, together with the whole Amt passed to the Kingdom, and after 1918, the State of Prussia. After 1952, when East Germany abolished the Land system, Söllichau, along with its neighbours Tornau and Schwemsal were taken out of the Amt. Söllichau ended up in the Halle region, and more locally in the Gräfenhainichen district. After German Reunification in 1990, Söllichau stayed for the time being in Gräfenhainichen district, but the district itself was later made part of Wittenberg district.

== Geography and transportation ==
Söllichau's neighbouring towns are Bad Düben, Bad Schmiedeberg, Wittenberg, Kemberg, Pretzsch and Torgau. Söllichau lies on the abandoned railway line between Eilenburg and Pretzsch. Söllichau is a transport hub for two State Highways (Landesstraßen) and two district roads (Kreisstraßen) of great importance to local traffic.

== Politics ==
(Municipal election on 13 June 2004)

- Reinhard Domtera
- Kay Eckelmann
- Bernd Hoffmann
- Marko Höhne
- Thomas Kaiser
- Sylvia Kästner
- Björn Kieselstein
- Dirk Koch
- Christa König
- Holger Kriener
- Hannelore Purschwitz
- Otto Trebeljahr

Source: Statistisches Landesamt Sachsen-Anhalt

== Neighbouring municipalities ==
- Bad Schmiedeberg
- Korgau
- Tornau (Dübener Heide)
- Bad Düben
- Kossa

== Sightseeing ==
- Neo-Romanesque village church
- Former NVA command bunker
- Bronze Age cairns, on district road 2029 Söllichau - Korgau - Pretzsch
- Röhrenkästenbrunnen
- Old village blacksmith's shop
- Mineral spring, seven-arm columns
