= Trebitz =

- Stadtteil of Bad Schmiedeberg
- Interactive map of Trebitz
- Location within Germany Location within Saxony-Anhalt
- Coordinates: 51°45′N 12°45′E
- Country: Germany
- State: Saxony-Anhalt
- District: Wittenberg
- Town: Bad Schmiedeberg

Area
  - Total: 23.75 km^{2} (9.17 sq mi)
- Elevation: 73 m (240 ft)

Population (2006-12-31)
  - Total: 1,282
  - Density: 53.98/km^{2} (139.8/sq mi)
- Time zone: UTC+01:00 (CET)
  - Summer (DST): UTC+02:00 (CEST)
- Postal codes: 06909
- Dialling codes: 034927
- Vehicle registration: WB
- Website: www.bad-schmiedeberg.de

Trebitz is a village and a former municipality in Wittenberg district in Saxony-Anhalt, Germany. Since 1 July 2009, it is part of the town Bad Schmiedeberg.

== Geography and transportation ==
Trebitz lies about 17 km (11 mi) southeast of Wittenberg and about 7 km (4 mi) from Pretzsch, on the north edge of the Düben Heath. Federal Highway (Bundesstraße) B 187 and the railway line between Wittenberg and Torgau run through the municipality.

== Subdivisions ==
Besides Trebitz itself, the subdivisions of the municipality are Bösewig, Kleinzerbst and Österitz.

== Sport ==
The local MC Trebitz runs a motocross track.
