= Priesitz =

- Stadtteil of Bad Schmiedeberg
- Interactive map of Priesitz
- Location within Germany Location within Saxony-Anhalt
- Coordinates: 51°42′N 12°49′E
- Country: Germany
- State: Saxony-Anhalt
- District: Wittenberg
- Town: Bad Schmiedeberg

Area
  - Total: 10.09 km^{2} (3.90 sq mi)
- Elevation: 73 m (240 ft)

Population (2006-12-31)
  - Total: 271
  - Density: 26.9/km^{2} (69.6/sq mi)
- Time zone: UTC+01:00 (CET)
  - Summer (DST): UTC+02:00 (CEST)
- Postal codes: 06909
- Dialling codes: 034926
- Vehicle registration: WB

Priesitz is a village and a former municipality in Wittenberg district in Saxony-Anhalt, Germany. Since 1 July 2009, it is part of the town Bad Schmiedeberg.

== Geography ==
Priesitz lies about 25 kilometers southeast of Lutherstadt Wittenberg in the glacial valley of the Elbe at the edge of the Düben Heath Nature Park.

=== Subdivisions ===
Priesitz has one of these: Sachau.

== History ==
Priesitz had its first documentary mention in 1290.

== Regular events ==
Every year, the Lake Festival (Seefest) is held in early July as a village festival.

== Economy and transportation ==
Federal Highway (Bundesstraße) B 182, which joins Torgau and Wittenberg lies about 0.5 km away. The railway line between Torgau and Pretzsch has a stop in Sachau.
