= Meuro =

- Stadtteil of Bad Schmiedeberg
- Interactive map of Meuro
- Location within Germany Location within Saxony-Anhalt
- Coordinates: 51°44′N 12°42′E
- Country: Germany
- State: Saxony-Anhalt
- District: Wittenberg
- Town: Bad Schmiedeberg
- Subdivisions: 4

Area
  - Total: 26.59 km^{2} (10.27 sq mi)
- Elevation: 115 m (377 ft)

Population (2006-12-31)
  - Total: 613
  - Density: 23.1/km^{2} (59.7/sq mi)
- Time zone: UTC+01:00 (CET)
  - Summer (DST): UTC+02:00 (CEST)
- Postal codes: 06905
- Dialling codes: 034925
- Vehicle registration: WB
- Website: www.bad-schmiedeberg.de

Meuro is a village and a former municipality in Wittenberg district in Saxony-Anhalt, Germany. Since 1 July 2009, it is part of the town Bad Schmiedeberg.

== Geography and transport ==
Meuro lies about 20 km southeast of Lutherstadt Wittenberg and about 5 km northwest of Bad Schmiedeberg on the northern edge of the Düben Heath, putting the community's more southerly areas in the Düben Heath Nature Park. West of the community runs the Federal Highway (Bundesstraße) B 2, which joins Berlin and Wittenberg, and to the north runs the B 187. The community is also crossed by a stream called the Flieth.

=== Subdivisions ===
Meuro consists of Ogkeln, Sackwitz, and Scholis.

== Sightseeing ==
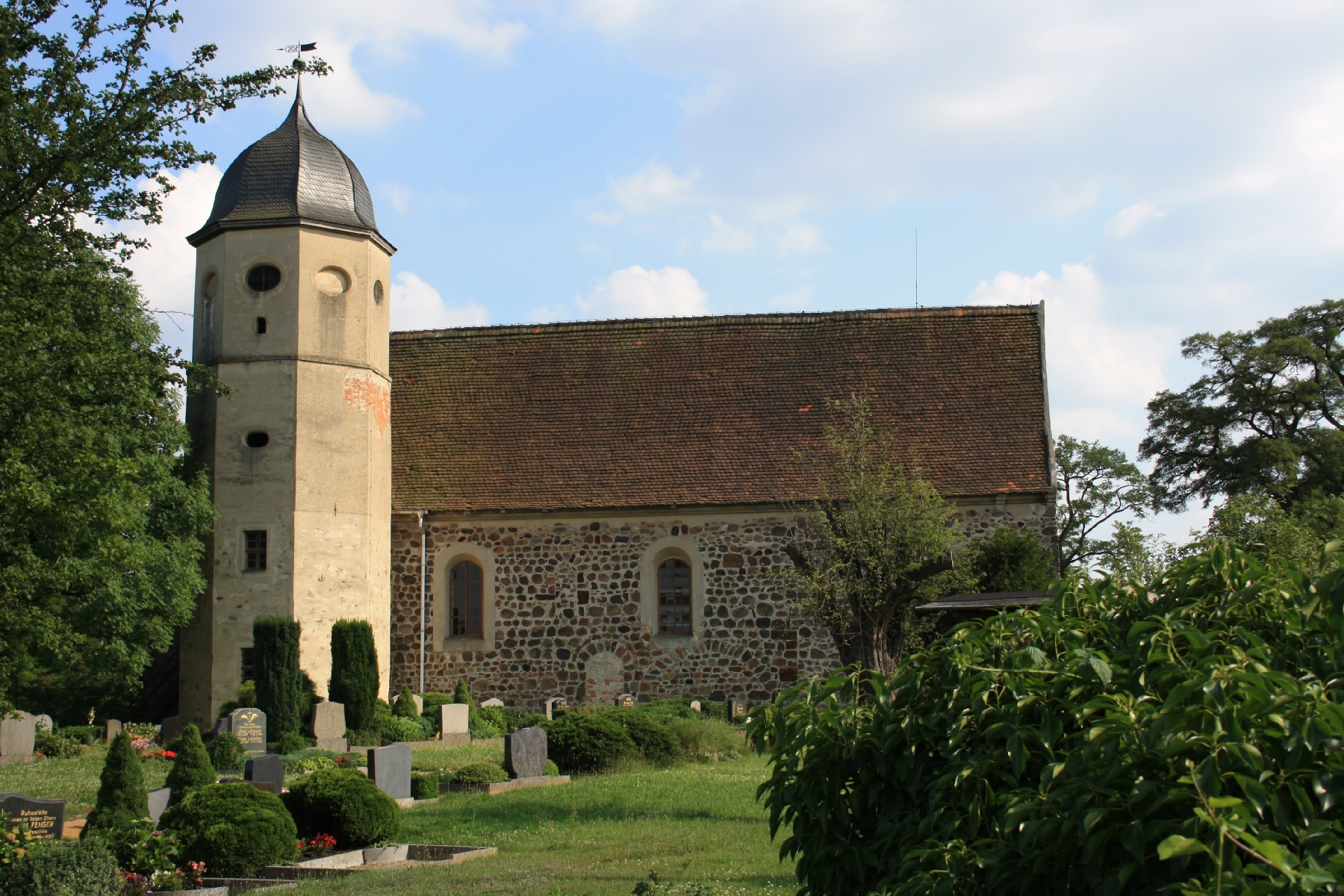
Fieldstone church in Meuro

- Meuroer Fieldstone church
- Dübener Heide
