= Christoph Hein =

German author and translator (born 1944)

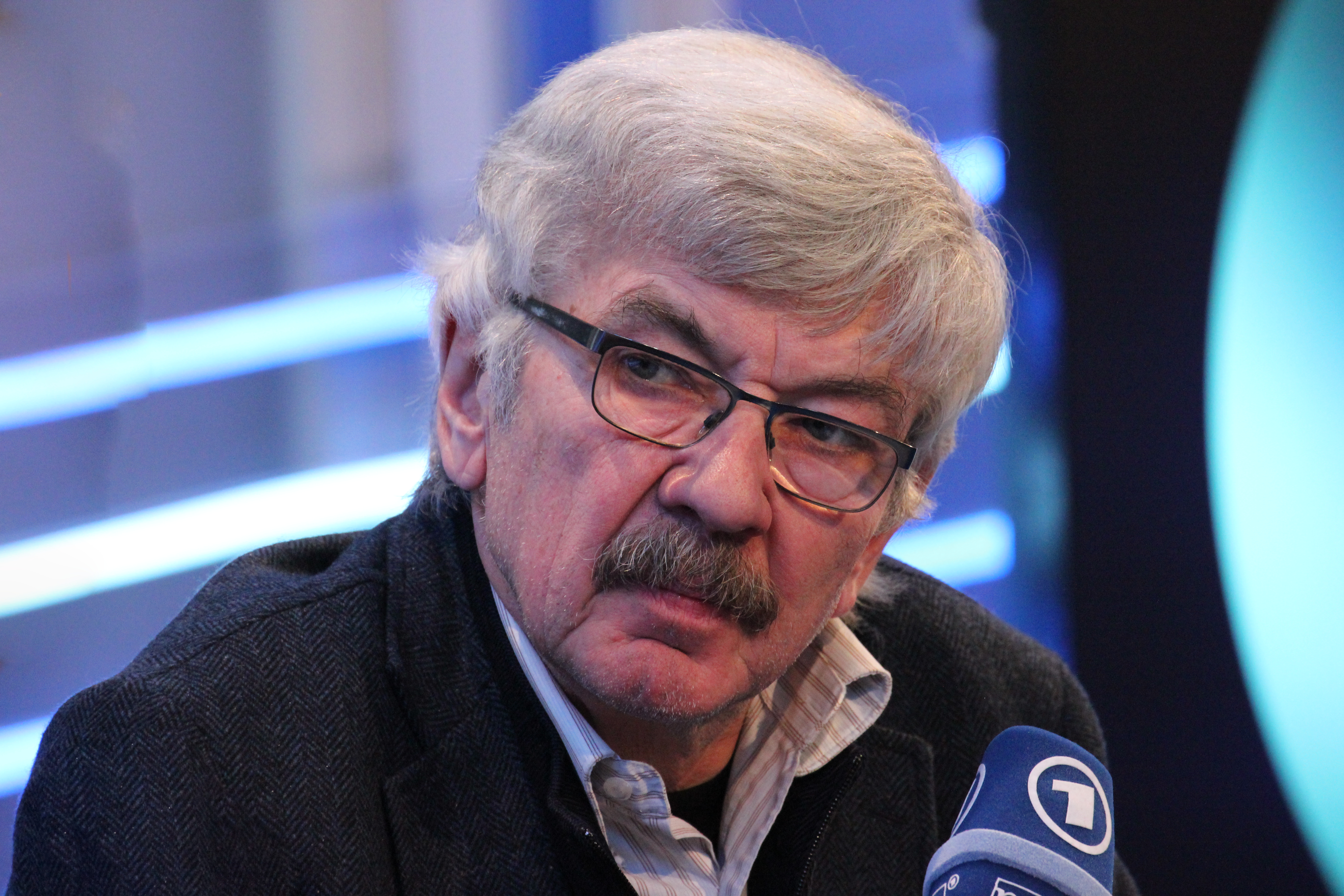
- Born: 8 April 1944 (age 82); Heinzendorf Jasienica, Lower Silesian Voivodeship, Poland
- Occupations: Novelist, translator, Essayist
- Writing career
- Period: 1980–present
- Notable awards: Heinrich Mann Prize; 1982; Erich Fried Prize; 1990; Solothurner Literaturpreis; 2000; Austrian State Prize for European Literature; 2002
- Website: www.suhrkamp.de/autoren/autor.cfm?id=1845

Christoph Hein (German: [ˈkʁɪstɔf ˈhaɪn]; born 8 April 1944) is a German author and translator. He grew up in the town Bad Düben near Leipzig. Being a clergyman's son and thus not allowed to attend the Erweiterte Oberschule (EOS) in the GDR, he received secondary education at a gymnasium in the western part of Berlin. After his Abitur he jobbed inter alia as assembler, bookseller and assistant director. From 1967 to 1971 Hein studied philosophy in Leipzig and Berlin. Upon graduation, he became a dramatic adviser at the Volksbühne in Berlin, where he worked as a resident writer from 1974. Since 1979 Hein has worked as a freelance writer.

Hein first became known for his 1982 novella Der fremde Freund (The Distant Lover). From 1998 to 2000 Hein was the first president of the pan-German PEN-Centre.

According to Hein, the acclaimed film drama The Lives of Others is loosely based on his life story. In a 2019 article, he claims that after attending the premiere screening, he asked author and director von Donnersmarck to have his name removed from the credits, because he felt that the movie was a "scary tale taking place in a fantasy land, comparable to Tolkien's Middle-earth," that "does not depict the 1980s in the GDR".

== Awards ==
- 1982: Heinrich Mann Prize of the Akademie der Künste der DDR
- 1983: Deutscher Kritikerpreis
- 1986: Mara-Cassens-Preis des Hamburger Literaturhauses für den Ersten Roman
- 1989: Stefan-Andres-Preis (Stadt Schweich an der Mosel)
- 1989: Lessing-Preis der DDR (Ministerium für Kultur)
- 1990: Erich Fried Prize (Wien)
- 1992: Ludwig-Mülheims-Theaterpreis für religiöse Dramatik
- 1992: Berliner Literaturpreis of the Stiftung Preußische Seehandlung
- 1994: Großes Bundesverdienstkreuz (5. Oktober 1994)
- 1998: Peter-Weiss-Preis of the city of Bochum
- 2000: Solothurner Literaturpreis
- 2000: Zonser Hörspielpreis
- 2002: Brothers Grimm Poetics Professorship
- 2002: Österreichischer Staatspreis für Europäische Literatur
- 2003: Calwer Hermann-Hesse-Stipendium
- 2004: Schiller-Gedächtnispreis des Landes Baden-Württemberg
- 2004: Ver.di-Literaturpreis Berlin-Brandenburg
- 2008: Walter-Hasenclever-Literaturpreis
- 2010: Eichendorff-Literaturpreis
- 2011: Gerty-Spies-Literaturpreis
- 2011: Honorary citizenship of Bad Düben
- 2012: Uwe Johnson Prize
- 2013: International Stefan Heym Prize
- 2017: Grimmelshausen-Preis for Glückskind mit Vater
- 2020: Kinderbuchpreis des Landes Nordrhein-Westfalen (together illustrator Rotraut Susanne Berner) for Alles was Du brauchst – Die 20 wichtigsten Dinge im Leben

== Works ==
- Die Witwe des Maurers (1980)
- Frank, eine Kindheit mit Vätern (narrative, 1980)
- Einladung zum Lever Bourgeois (narratives, 1980)
- Cromwell und andere Stücke (plays, 1981)
- Der fremde Freund (novella, 1982, in Western Germany: Drachenblut, English translation The Distant Lover)
- Die wahre Geschichte des Ah Q (play, 1982)
- Das Wildpferd unterm Kachelofen (children's book, 1984)
- Horns Ende (novel, 1985)
- Schlötel oder Was solls (play, 1986)
- Öffentlich arbeiten (essays and interviews, 1987)
- Passage – ein Kammerspiel in drei Akten (play, 1987)
- Die Ritter der Tafelrunde (play, 1989)
- Der Tangospieler (narrative, 1989, English translation The Tango Player)
- Als Kind habe ich Stalin gesehen (essays and speeches, 1990)
- Das Napoleon-Spiel (novel, 1993)
- Exekution eines Kalbes und andere Erzählungen (narratives, 1994)
- Randow – eine Komödie (play, 1994)
- Von allem Anfang an (autobiography, 1997)
- Willenbrock (novel, 2000, made into a movie in 2005, English translation Willenbrock)
- Mama ist gegangen (children's novel, 2003)
- Landnahme (novel, 2004, English translation "Settlement" to be published November 2008)
- In seiner frühen Kindheit ein Garten (novel, 2005)
- Frau Paula Trousseau (novel 2007)
- Über die Schädlichkeit des Tabaks. Rede an die Abiturienten des Jahrgangs 2009
- Das Narrenschiff. 2025. Novel, Ship of Fools, not yet translated into English.
