= Korgau =

- Stadtteil of Bad Schmiedeberg
- Interactive map of Korgau
- Location within Germany Location within Saxony-Anhalt
- Coordinates: 51°40′N 12°45′E
- Country: Germany
- State: Saxony-Anhalt
- District: Wittenberg
- Town: Bad Schmiedeberg
- Subdivisions: 2 Ortsteile

Area
  - Total: 11.66 km^{2} (4.50 sq mi)
- Elevation: 115 m (377 ft)

Population (2006-12-31)
  - Total: 356
  - Density: 30.5/km^{2} (79.1/sq mi)
- Time zone: UTC+01:00 (CET)
  - Summer (DST): UTC+02:00 (CEST)
- Postal codes: 06905
- Dialling codes: 034925
- Vehicle registration: WB
- Website: www.bad-schmiedeberg.de

Korgau is a village and a former municipality in Wittenberg district in Saxony-Anhalt, Germany. Since 1 July 2009, it is part of the town Bad Schmiedeberg.

== Location ==
Korgau lies 2 km south of Bad Schmiedeberg on the eastern edge of the Düben Heath. It can be reached by road from Bad Schmiedeberg and Moschwig.

== History ==
Korgau is formed out of two communities named Großkorgau and Kleinkorgau (groß = great; klein = little in German), which under a decree issued on 20 July 1950, when the region was part of East Germany, were combined to form the single community of Korgau. The first time that either place was mentioned was supposedly about 1400.

Through Korgau ran the old postal road from Düben to Pretzsch, which unfortunately also brought marauding troops during the Thirty Years' War who wrought much destruction.

Großkorgau belonged until 1815 to the Amt (subnational entity) of Pretzsch in the Kingdom of Saxony, whereupon it passed to Wittenberg district in the administrative region of Merseburg in the Prussian province of Saxony.

== Sightseeing ==
- Post mill from 1824
