= Elfriede Gerstl =

Austrian writer and Holocaust survivor

Elfriede Gerstl

Elfriede Gerstl (16 June 1932 – 9 April 2009) was an Austrian author who survived the Holocaust. Gerstl, who was Jewish, was born in Vienna, where her father worked as a dentist.

== Biography ==
She survived the war years by hiding in various locations with her mother – at one point she had to hide in a wardrobe – and thereby avoided being sent off to a concentration camp. After the war she started studying medicine and psychology at Vienna University, but ended her studies after the birth of her daughter. During the 1950s she became more and more involved in writing, and published her first work in the journal Neue Wege (New Ways) in 1955. Her first published book was Gesellschaftsspiele mit mir (Party games with me), a collection of poems and short prose that came out in 1962. In 1963 Gerstl moved to West-Berlin, where she received a scholarship from the Literarisches Colloquium Berlin. While living in Berlin, in 1968–69, she wrote the novel Spielräume (Room to Manoeuvre), which was not published until 1977. She remained in Berlin until 1972, when she returned to Vienna.

Gerstl's work spanned several different genres, including poems, essays and short stories. She was a devoted feminist, and much of her writing examines the subject of gender roles. In 1999 she received the Erich Fried Prize, as well as the Georg Trakl Poetry Award. On her death in 2009, Austrian minister of culture Claudia Schmied said that German-language literature had lost an important contributor. Gerstl's lifelong friend and colleague Elfriede Jelinek commented that, in spite of the tragic experiences of her life, Gerstl had always had the ability to write in a light and witty tone. Gerstl married author and radio editor Gerald Bisinger in 1960, with whom she had one daughter.

== Works ==
=== Collected works ===
- Band 1: Mittellange Minis. Herausgegeben von Christa Gürtler und Helga Mitterbauer. Graz: Droschl 2012. ISBN 978-3-85420-797-9
- Band 2: Behüte behütet. Herausgegeben von Christa Gürtler und Helga Mitterbauer. Graz: Droschl 2013. ISBN 978-3-85420-844-0
- Band 3: Haus und Haut. Herausgegeben und mit einem Nachwort von Christa Gürtler und Martin Wedl. Graz: Droschl 2014. ISBN 978-3-85420-958-4
- Band 4: Tandlerfundstücke. Herausgegeben und mit einem Nachwort von Christa Gürtler und Martin Wedl. Graz: Droschl 2015. ISBN 978-3-85420-967-6

=== Individual editions ===
- Gesellschaftsspiele mit mir. Gedichte und Kurzprosa. Kulturamt der Stadt Linz 1962.
- Berechtige Fragen. Hörspiele. Edition Literaturproduzenten, Wien 1973.
- Spielräume. Roman. 1977. edition neue texte, Literaturverlag Droschl, Graz 1993.
- Narren und Funktionäre. Essays. Wien 1980.
- Wiener Mischung. Gedichte und Kurzprosa. edition neue texte, Literaturverlag Droschl, Linz/Graz 1982.
- eine frau ist eine frau ist eine frau … autorinnen über autorinnen (Herausgeberin). Promedia Verlag, Wien 1985. ISBN 978-3-900478-08-7
- Vor der Ankunft. Reisegedichte. Viersprachige Ausgabe, deutsch-englisch-französisch-italienisch, Freibord-Verlag Sonderreihe, Wien 1988.
- Ablagerungen. Anthologie. Hrsg. gemeinsam mit Herbert J. Wimmer, edition neue texte, Literaturverlag Droschl, Graz 1989.
- Unter einem Hut. Gedichte und Essays. Deuticke Verlag, Wien 1993.
- Kleiderflug – Texte Textilien Wohnen. Mit einer diskursiven Fotoserie von Herbert J. Wimmer: „alfabet des wohnens“. Edition Splitter, Wien 1995
  Erweiterte Neuauflage: kleiderflug – schreiben sammeln lebensräume. Mit einer diskursiven Fotoserie von Herbert J. Wimmer: „alfabet des wohnens“. Edition Splitter, Wien 2007. ISBN 978-3-901190-44-5.
- Die fliegende Frieda. Ein Jugendbuch. Mit Illustrationen von Angelica Kauffman. Edition Splitter, Wien 1998.
- Alle Tage Gedichte – Schaustücke. Hörstücke – plus Mini-Buch: hin & her & hin. Deuticke Verlag, Wien 1999.
- neue wiener mischung. neue und alte gedichte, kurzprosa. Mit einem Nachwort von Konstanze Fliedl. edition neue texte, Literaturverlag Droschl, Graz 2001.
- gemeinsam mit Herbert J. Wimmer: LOGO(S) – ein schachtelbuch. fünfzig text-ansichts-karten. Literaturverlag Droschl, Graz 2004. ISBN 3-85420-654-2
- mein papierener garten. gedichte. Literaturverlag Droschl, Graz 2006. ISBN 978-3-85420-708-5
- Spazi per giocare con la mente – Spielräume. Übersetzung von Dagmar Winkler. Vorworte von Elfriede Jelinek und Fausto Cercignani. Perosini Editore, Zevio/Verona 2007. ISBN 978-88-85409-63-7
- Assortimento viennese – Wiener Mischung. Gedichte, ausgewählt und übersetzt von Riccarda Novello. Vorwort von Elfriede Jelinek. Luciana Tufani Editrice, Ferrara 2008. ISBN 978-88-86780-69-8
- lebenszeichen – gedichte träume denkkrümel. Mit einem Vorwort von Elfriede Jelinek. Mit Illustrationen von Heinrich Heuer, Angelica Kauffman, Herbert J. Wimmer. Literaturverlag Droschl, Graz 2009. ISBN 978-3-85420-763-4

=== Recordings ===
- Alle Tage Gedichte - Ausgewählt und gelesen von Elfriede Gerstl. Der Hörverlag, München 2000 ISBN 3-89584-613-9
- A BISSAL GFIACHT A BISSAL GFREID... - eine Auswahl. Übersetzt ins Hebräische von Michael Dak, Jerusalem. Auf dem Tonträger: A BISSAL GFIACHT A BISSAL GFREID... gesprochen von Elfriede Gerstl, Timna Brauer, Erika Deutinger, Barbara Horvath, Sharon Nuni, Vera Albert, Anat Stainberg und Doron Rabinovici. Edition "Mittelmeer 23" Nr. 3, AlbertVera Verlag, Wien 2013 ISBN 978-3-9503164-2-1

== Bibliography ==
- Konstanze Fliedl & Christa Gürtler (eds.): Dossier Elfriede Gerstl (NR. 18). Literaturwissenschaftliche Arbeiten zu Elfriede Gerstl. Literaturverlag Droschl, Graz 2002.
- Herbert J. Wimmer: In Schwebe halten – Spielräume von Elfriede Gerstl – ein Diskursbuch literarischer und gesellschaftlicher Entwicklungen der 60er und 70er Jahre des 20. Jahrhunderts. 2. Auflage. edition praesens, Wien 1998.
- Dagmar Winkler-Pegoraro: Elfriede Gerstl. „Sprache(n), Spiele, Spielräume“. – Experimentelle Literatur in Österreich. Dissertation, Universität Wien 1999.
- Handbuch österreichischer Autorinnen und Autoren jüdischer Herkunft 18. bis 20. Jahrhundert. Band 1. Hrsg. von der Österreichischen Nationalbibliothek, Wien. Saur, München 2002, pp. 414 f.
