= Schnellin =

- Stadtteil of Bad Schmiedeberg
- Interactive map of Schnellin
- Location within Germany Location within Saxony-Anhalt
- Coordinates: 51°46′N 12°43′E
- Country: Germany
- State: Saxony-Anhalt
- District: Wittenberg
- Town: Bad Schmiedeberg

Area
  - Total: 7.30 km^{2} (2.82 sq mi)
- Elevation: 69 m (226 ft)

Population (2006-12-31)
  - Total: 318
  - Density: 43.6/km^{2} (113/sq mi)
- Time zone: UTC+01:00 (CET)
  - Summer (DST): UTC+02:00 (CEST)
- Postal codes: 06901
- Dialling codes: 034927

Schnellin is a village and a former municipality in Wittenberg district in Saxony-Anhalt, Germany. Since 1 July 2009, it is part of the town Bad Schmiedeberg.

== Geography ==
=== Location ===
Schnellin lies about 17 km southeast of Lutherstadt Wittenberg on the edge of the Düben Heath Nature Park.

=== Constituent communities ===
Schnellin has one of these: Merkwitz.

== History ==
Schnellin had its first documentary mention in 1388 under the name Slenyn.

== Regular events ==
The village festival is held yearly at Whitsun weekend.

== Economy and transportation ==
Federal Highway (Bundesstraße) B 182 between Wittenberg and Torgau is about 2 km away.
