= Bad Düben =

- Town
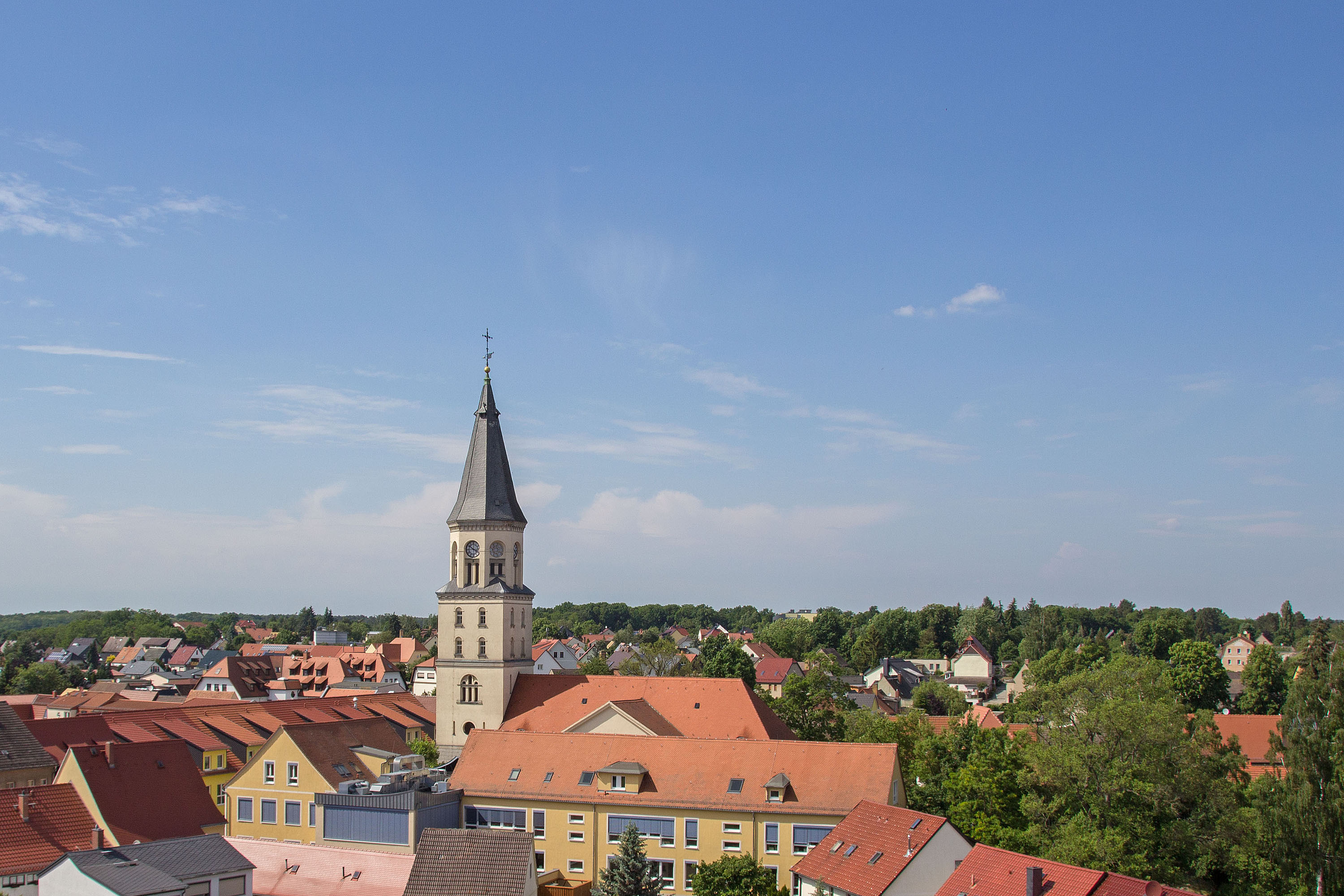
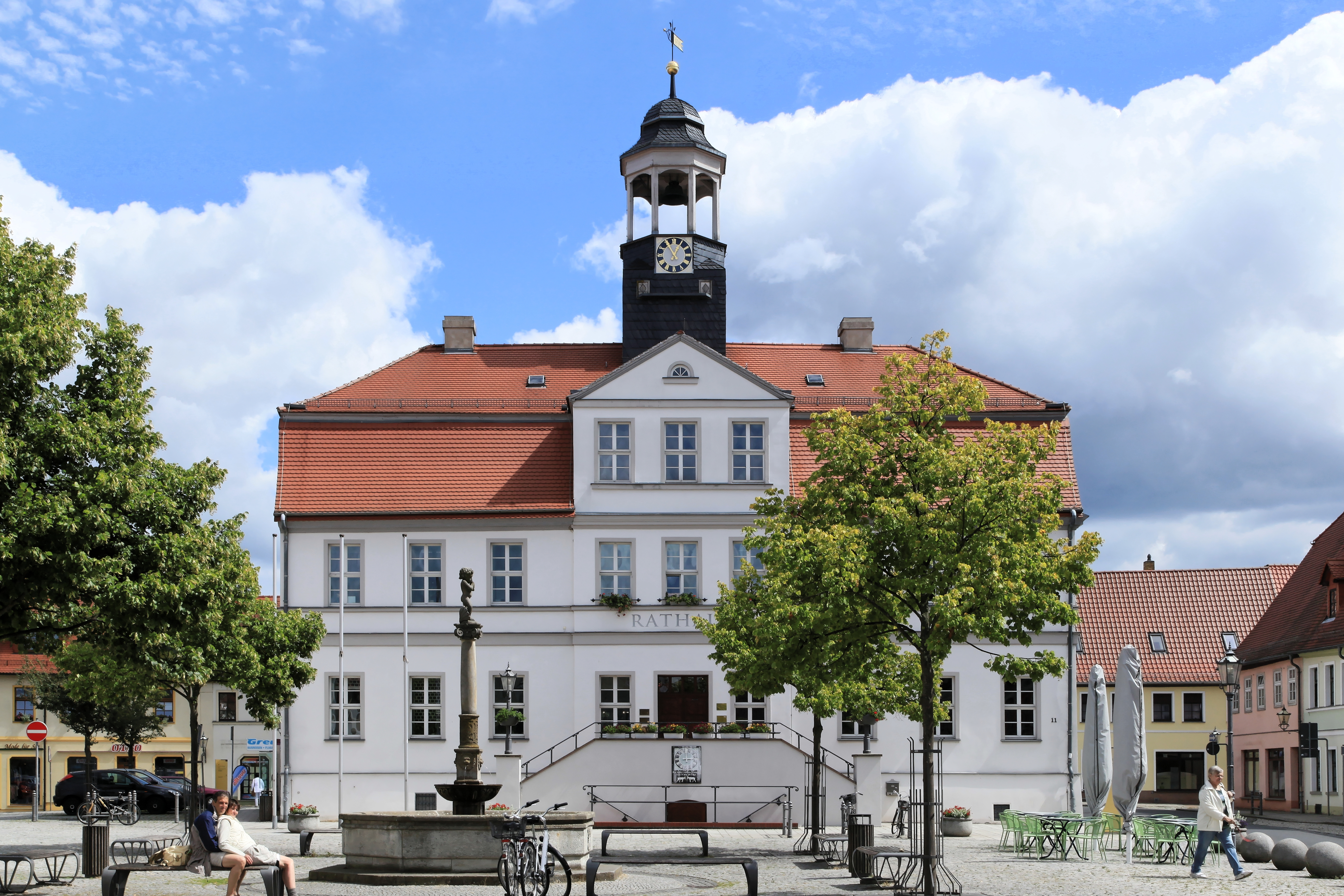
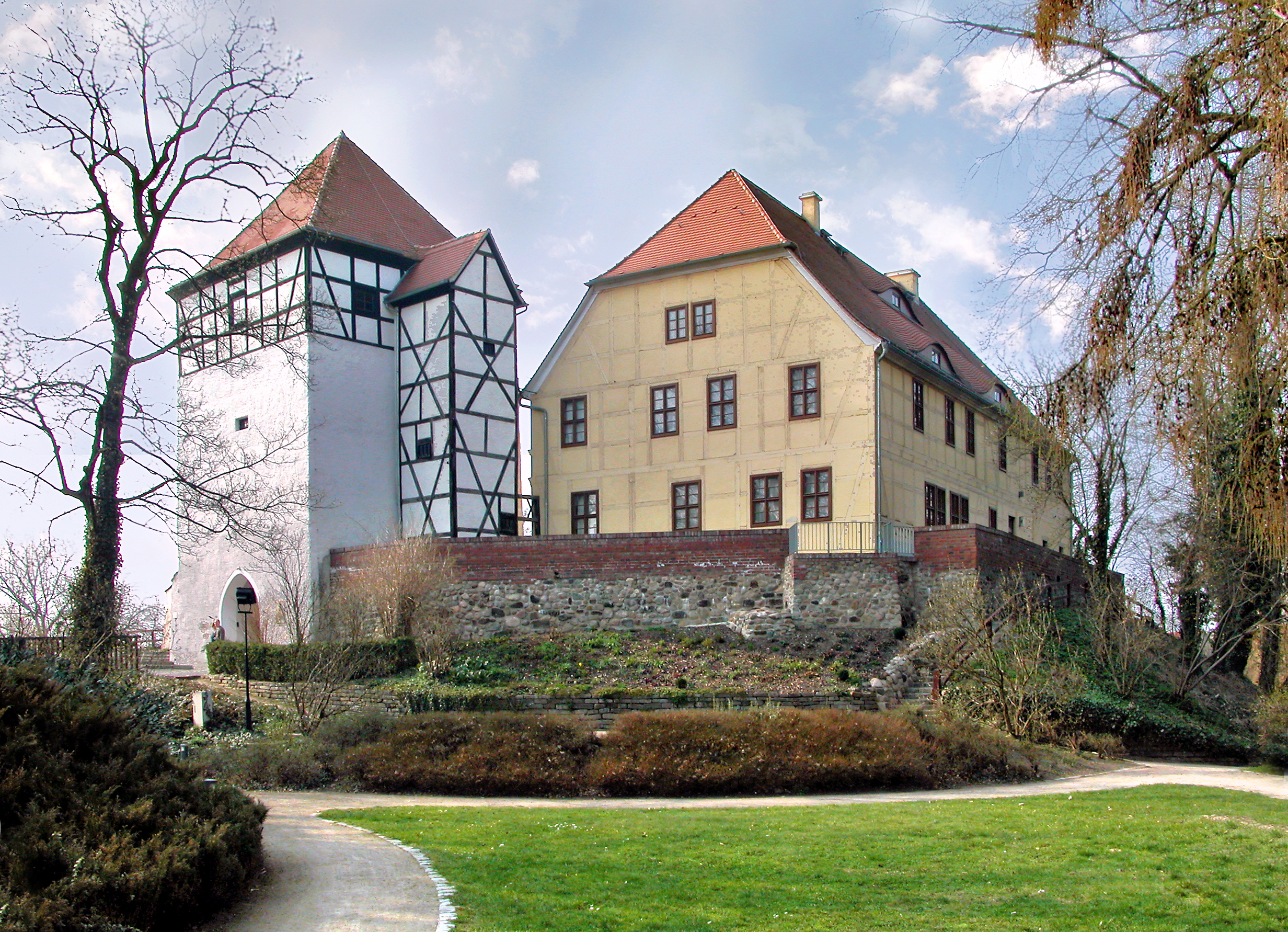
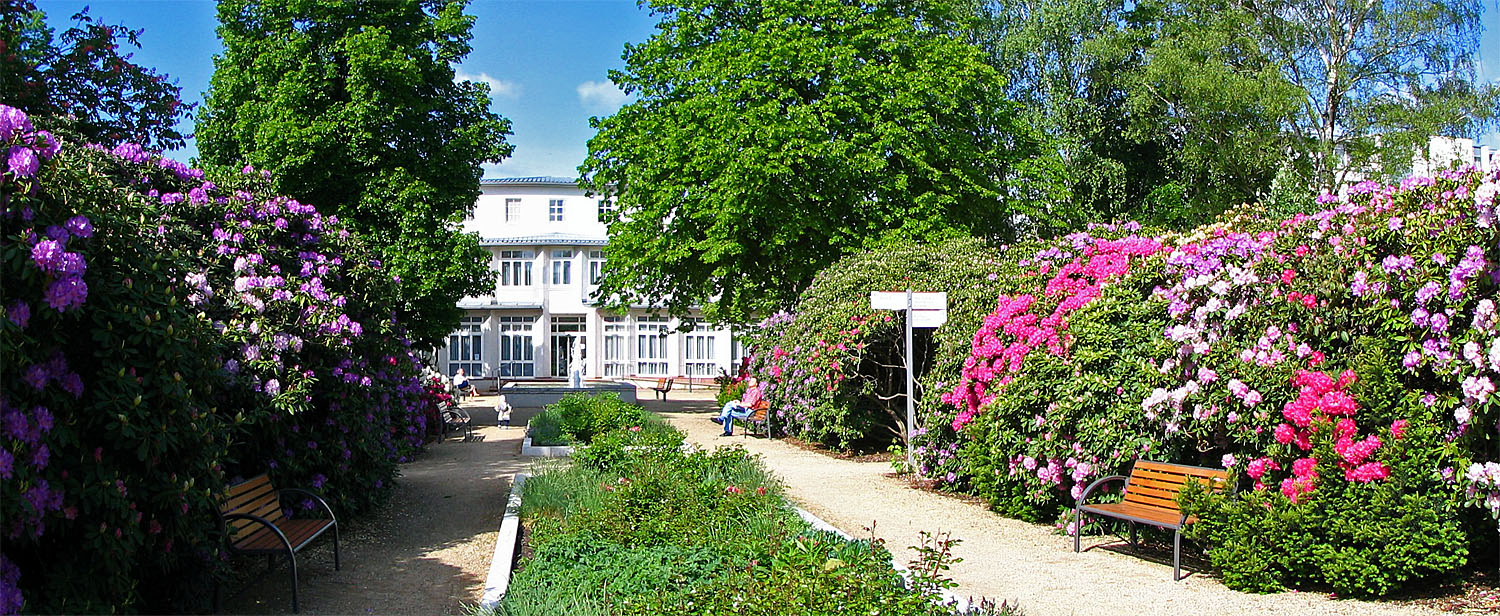
- View over Bad Düben with St. Nikolai church Townhall Castle Bad Düben Spa Park Bad Düben Town hall

- Coat of arms

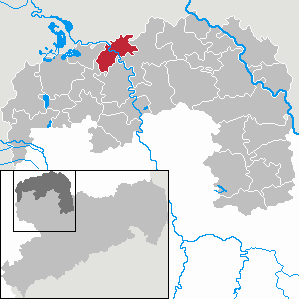
- Location of Bad Düben within Nordsachsen district
- Interactive map of Bad Düben
- Location within Germany Location within Saxony
- Coordinates: 51°35′31″N 12°35′7″E
- Country: Germany
- State: Saxony
- District: Nordsachsen
- Subdivisions: 4 Stadtteile

Government
  - Mayor (2021–28): Astrid Münster (FW)

Area
  - Total: 45.81 km^{2} (17.69 sq mi)
- Elevation: 98 m (322 ft)

Population (2025-12-31)
  - Total: 7,717
  - Density: 168.5/km^{2} (436.3/sq mi)
- Time zone: UTC+01:00 (CET)
  - Summer (DST): UTC+02:00 (CEST)
- Postal codes: 04849
- Dialling codes: 034243
- Vehicle registration: TDO, DZ, EB, OZ, TG, TO
- Website: www.bad-dueben.de

Bad Düben (German pronunciation: [ˌbaːt ˈdyːbm̩]), until 1948 Düben is a town in the district of Nordsachsen in Saxony in Germany. It is situated at the southern end of the Düben Heath Nature Park (Düben Heath), between the rivers Elbe and Mulde, which runs through the city center.

== History ==
Bad Düben's history goes back at least 1,000 years and traces its origins to the Slavic castle of Dibni, with the first documented mention in 981. Fortifications around the castle led in time to the formation of the town at the Mulde. The town was the site of several historical events, including a battle in 1450 in the feud between Friedrich and Wilhelm von Thüringen, in which the old castle was completely destroyed. The legendary dispute between Hans Kohlhase and Günter von Zaschnitz was settled in a court established in the town in 1533.

In 1631, during the Thirty Years' War Gustav Adolf II and John George I, Elector of Saxony met in the town to forge an alliance against Ferdinand II, Holy Roman Emperor.

In 1813, Napoleon Bonaparte and his troops spent a night in the Burg Düben before heading towards Leipzig where the Battle of the Nations would later take place. After the Congress of Vienna in 1815, Bad Düben was ceded to Prussia, becoming a part of the Province of Saxony.

In 1948, the town of Düben was awarded the title of "Bad", which means spa. Following the administrative reform and subsequent disbandment of Saxony–Anhalt in 1952, Bad Düben became a part of the newly formed Leipzig District. In July 1990, Bad Düben became a part of the reformed Saxony and was incorporated into the District of Delitzsch, which became a part of Nordsachsen (Northern Saxony) following the administrative reform of 2008.

== Personalities who have worked locally ==
- Bärbel Wachholz (1938–1984), DDR-pop singer
- Christoph Hein (born 1944), author and honorary citizen, grew up in the city
- Elke Dopp (born 1965), professor of hygiene and environmental medicine, born in Bad Düben
- Norman Liebold (born 1976), author, artist and actor, went to school in Bad Düben

== Main sights ==
- Castle Bad Düben, a medieval castle located in the southern part of the town
- St Nicolas Church, a former Catholic and now Lutheran church located near the town's main square
