= Düben Heath =

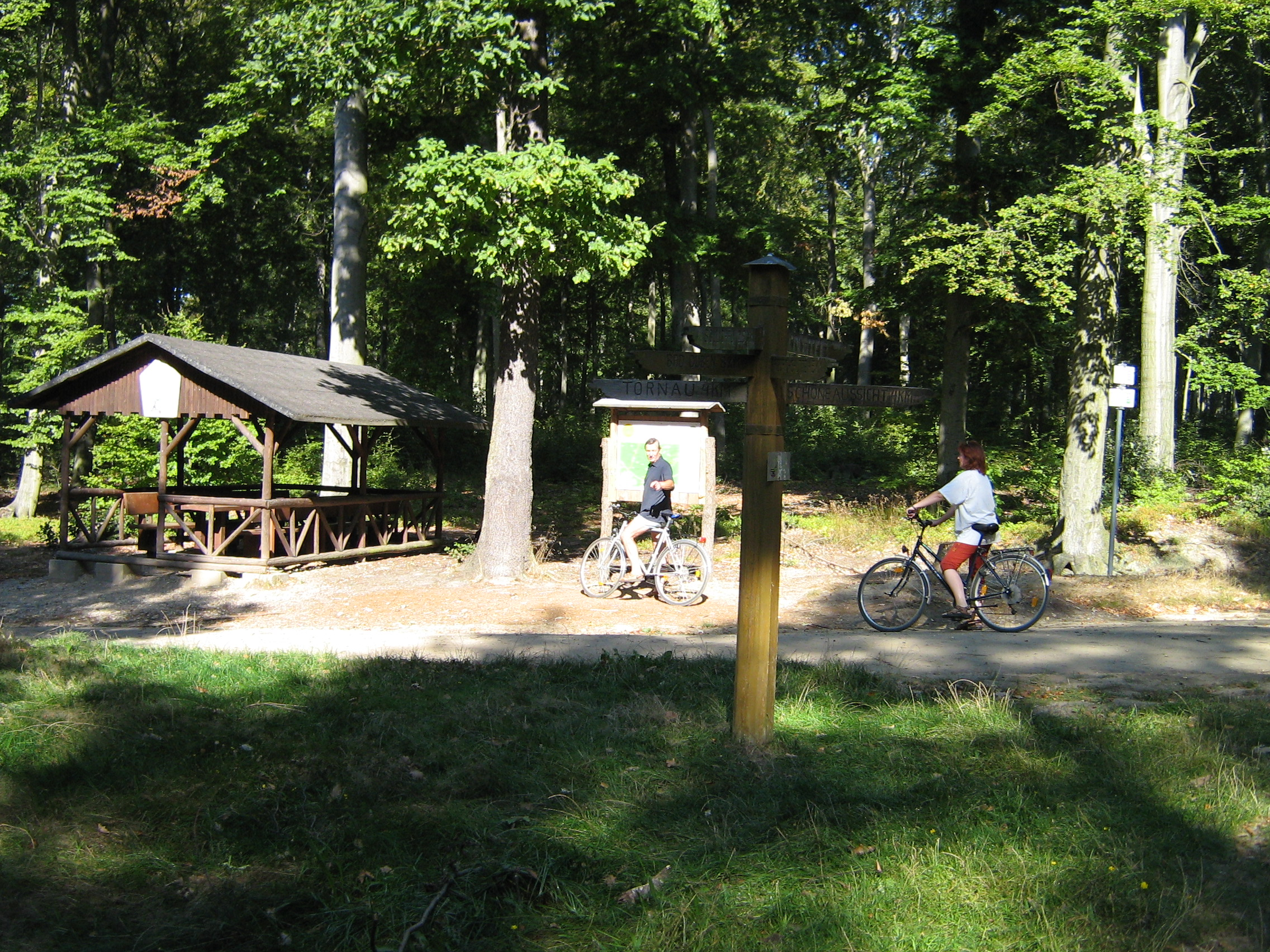
The signpost Siebenarmsäule ("Seven Arm Column") in the Düben Heath

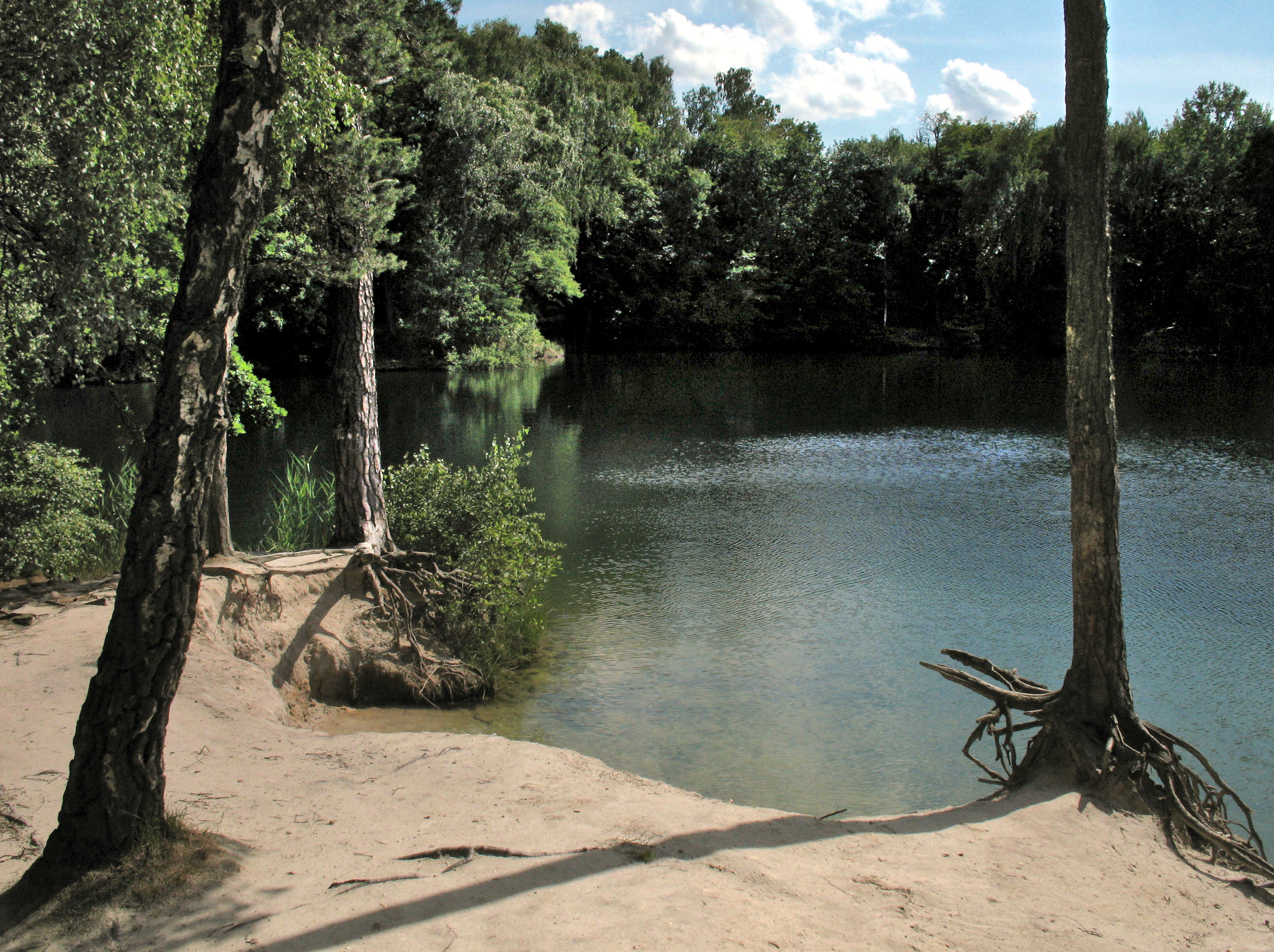
Blaues Auge near Bad Schmiedeberg

The Düben Heath (German: Dübener Heide, pronounced [ˈdyːbənɐ ˈhaɪdə]) is a landscape in Germany in eastern Saxony-Anhalt and northern Saxony, between the rivers Elbe and the Mulde, on the northern edge of the Leipzig Bay.

It is bounded in the west by the town of Dessau, in the north by the Elbe valley (Wittenberg, Pretzsch), in the southeast by Torgau, in the south by Eilenburg and the course of the Mulde through Bad Düben and Bitterfeld.

The Düben Heath is a terminal moraine landscape formed during the Saale glaciation (Plateau of Gräfenhainichen-Schmiedeberg) with predominantly sandy soils. Beneath this Pleistocene cover lie lignite-bearing strata. The majority of the Düben Heath is covered by forest.

The eastern part of the Düben Heath, with the resort of Bad Düben, is designated as a nature park. In the western part around Gräfenhainichen and Bitterfeld, lignite was extracted until the end of the 1980s in open pits; as a result large areas of the natural woodland landscape were destroyed. Since then, the pits have been remediated and the hollows with water. In the vicinity of Gräfenhainichen on a peninsula in the flooded Ferropolis open pit a museum of technology has been established, where open pit mining equipment and railway vehicles are displayed.

The dialects spoken in the Düben Heath in former times were as different as the landscape of the heath is varied. These dialects are sub-groups of the Upper Saxon German dialect, which is one of the central German languages. The development of these dialects was a result of several settlement phases, shaped by the borders of different domains and foreign influences.

With the settlement of displaced persons from the former eastern territories of Germany in the late 1940s, the migration of labour, the influence of literature, press, radio and television, the dialects of the Düben Heath are now hardly spoken.

== See also ==
- Düben Heath Nature Park
- List of regions of Saxony

== Literature ==
- Archivbilder DÜBENER HEIDE, Author: Manfred Wilde, Sutton Verlag GmbH, Erfurt, 1999
- Aus dem Volksmund der Heimat - Wörterbuch der Dübener Heide, Author: Otto Kieser, Herausgeber: Verein Dübener Heide e.V., 2nd edition, 2007
