= Bad Schmiedeberg =

- Town
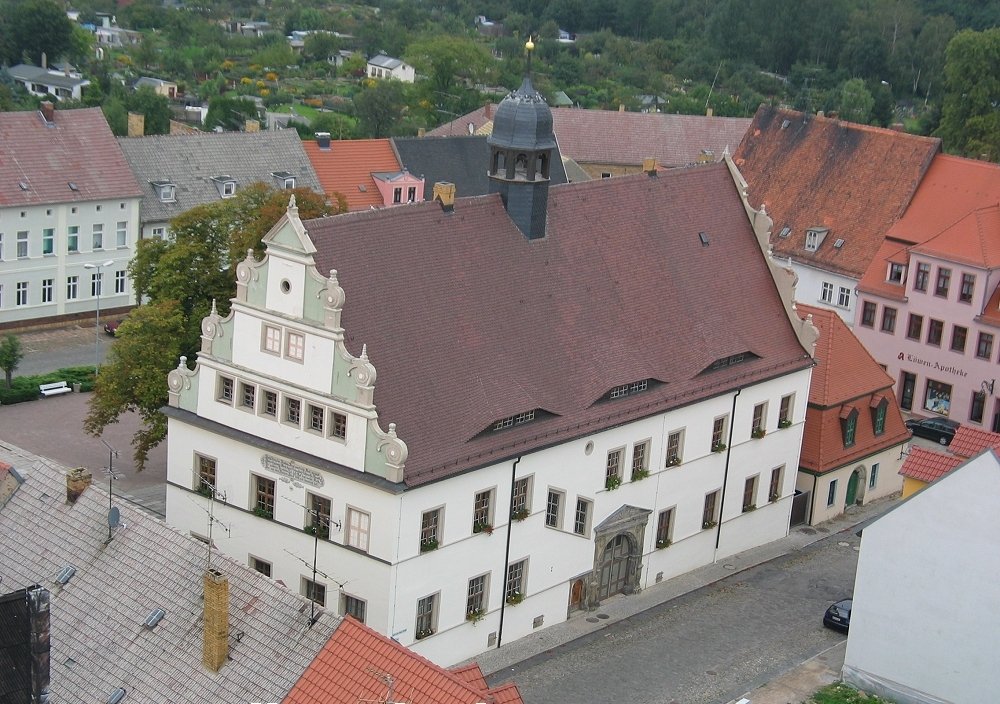
- Town hall

- Coat of arms

- Location of Bad Schmiedeberg within Wittenberg district
- Interactive map of Bad Schmiedeberg
- Location within Germany Location within Saxony-Anhalt
- Coordinates: 51°41′17″N 12°44′15″E
- Country: Germany
- State: Saxony-Anhalt
- District: Wittenberg

Government
  - Mayor (2023–30): Heike Dorczok

Area
  - Total: 160.02 km^{2} (61.78 sq mi)
- Elevation: 100 m (330 ft)

Population (2025-12-31)
  - Total: 7,852
  - Density: 49.07/km^{2} (127.1/sq mi)
- Time zone: UTC+01:00 (CET)
  - Summer (DST): UTC+02:00 (CEST)
- Postal codes: 06905
- Dialling codes: 034925
- Vehicle registration: WB
- Website: www.bad-schmiedeberg.de

Bad Schmiedeberg (German pronunciation: [baːt ˈʃmiːdəˌbɛʁk]) is a small town in the district of Wittenberg, Saxony-Anhalt, Germany. It lies within the Düben Heath Nature Park.

== History ==
The town was first mentioned in 1206 as Smedeberg. In 1350, it was granted town rights.

== Geography ==
The town Bad Schmiedeberg consists of the following Ortschaften or municipal divisions:

- Bad Schmiedeberg
- Korgau
- Meuro
- Pretzsch
- Priesitz
- Schnellin
- Söllichau
- Trebitz

== Main sights ==
- The Evangelical Town Church was consecrated in 1453 as a Gothic hall church.
- Art Nouveau Kurhaus ("spa house") built in 1908.
- Bundesradfahrerdenkmal (Federal Cyclists' Memorial), endowed by the Bund Deutscher Radfahrer (League of German Cyclists), dedicated on 17 June 1923 in honour of fallen and missing club members and sportsmen.

== Cultural events ==
- Schmiedeberger Margarethenfest, honouring Electress Margaret of Austria. In 2006, the festival marked its 575th year, and also the town's 800th anniversary of first documentary mention.

== Politics ==
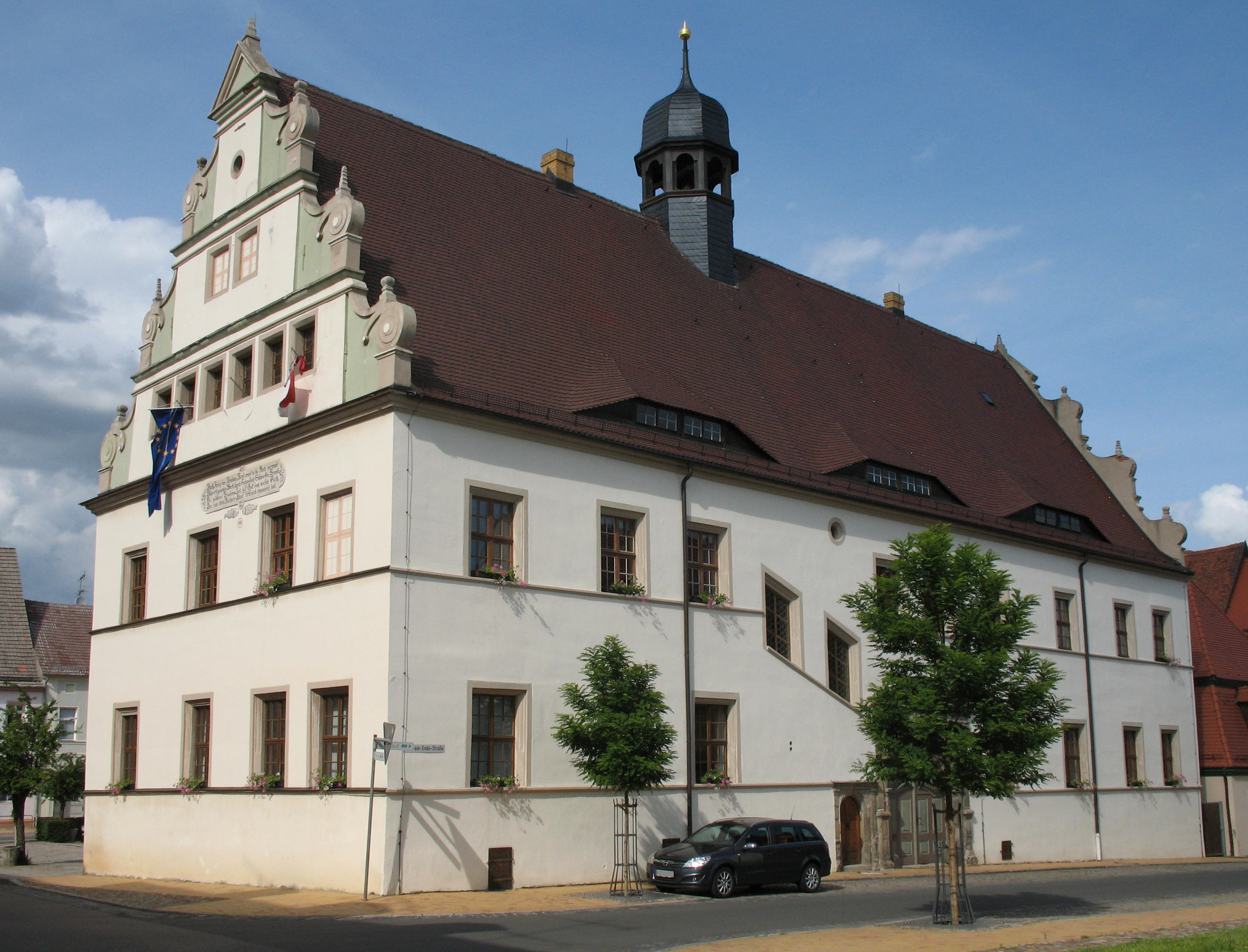
Town hall in Saxon Renaissance style

=== Town council ===
- CDU 6 seats
- FDP 3 seats
- PDS 3 seats
- SPD 1 seat
- Agriculture, environment nature 1 seat
- Pro Bad Schmiedeberg 1 seat
- independent 1 seat

=== Mayor ===
Stefan Dammhayn was elected mayor on 3 April 2005. In April 2016 Martin Röthel (SPD) was elected mayor for seven years.

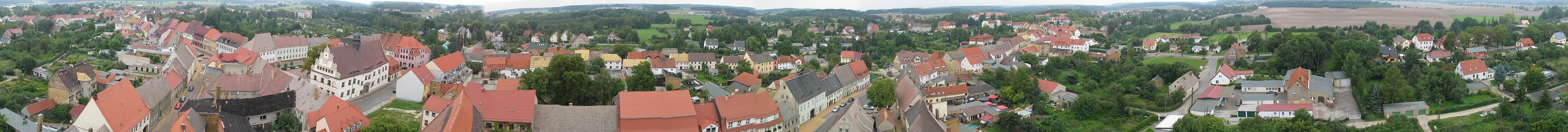
360° Panorama of Bad Schmiedeberg.

== Sons and daughters of the town ==
- Johann Nicolaus Anton (1737-1813), Lutheran theologian
- Ernst Theumer (1890-1978), Austrian politician (SPÖ)
- Heinrich Schütz (1906-1986), concentration camp doctor

=== Personalities related to city ===
- Oskar Benecke (1874-1957 / 60), local historian and chronicler, conservationist and archive keeper,

== Gallery ==
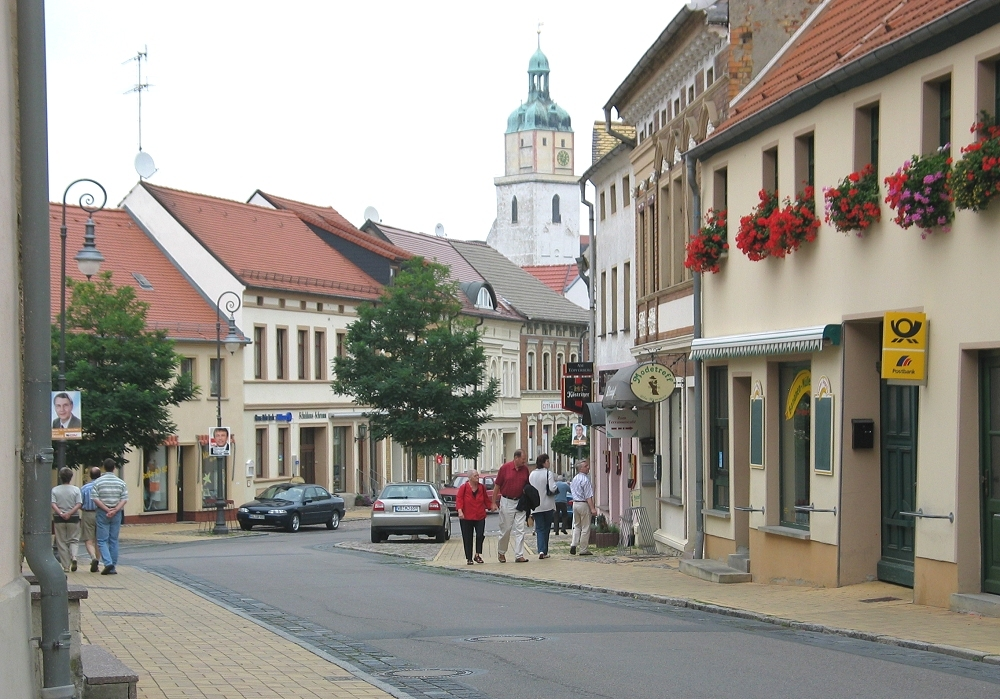
Downtown

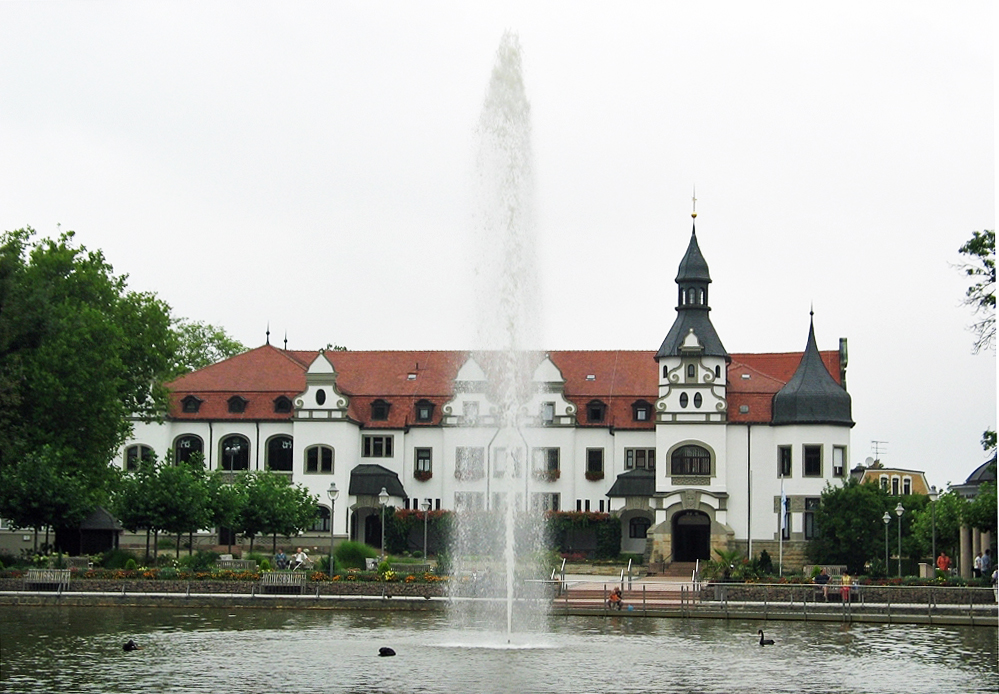
Art Nouveau Kurhaus ("spa house")

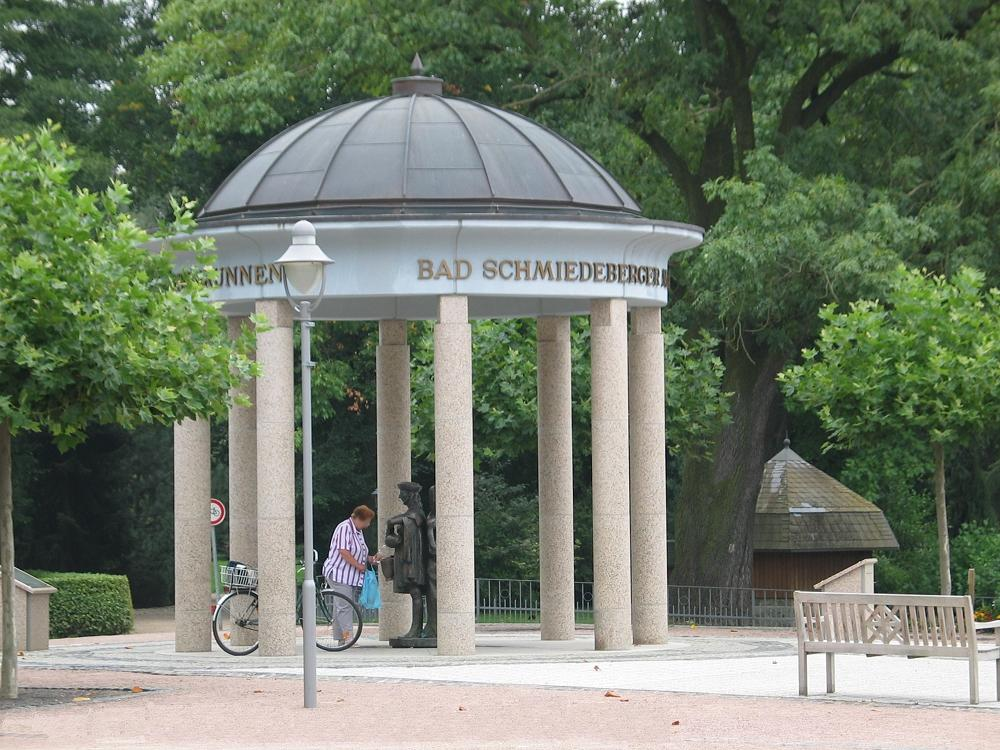
Health Fountain (Heilbrunnen) at the Kurhaus

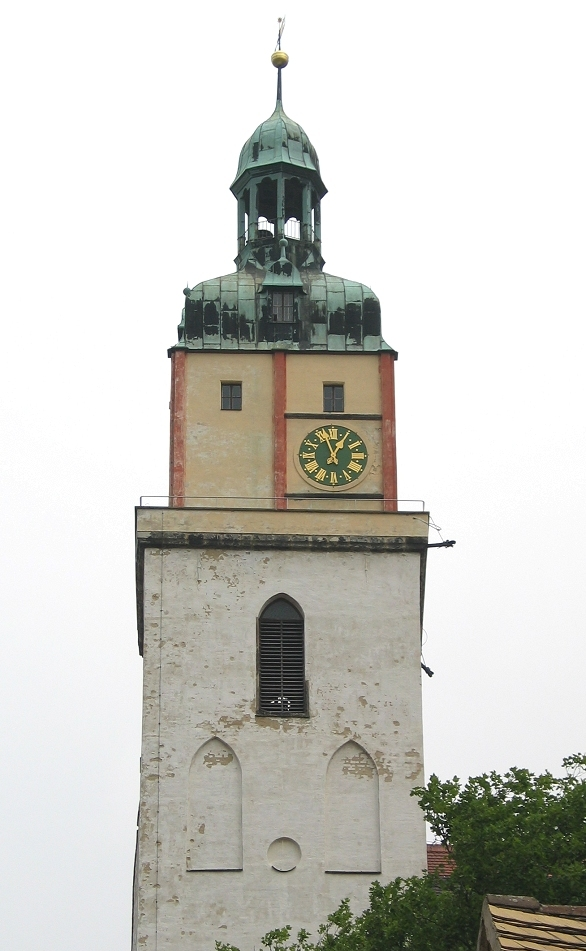
Church tower

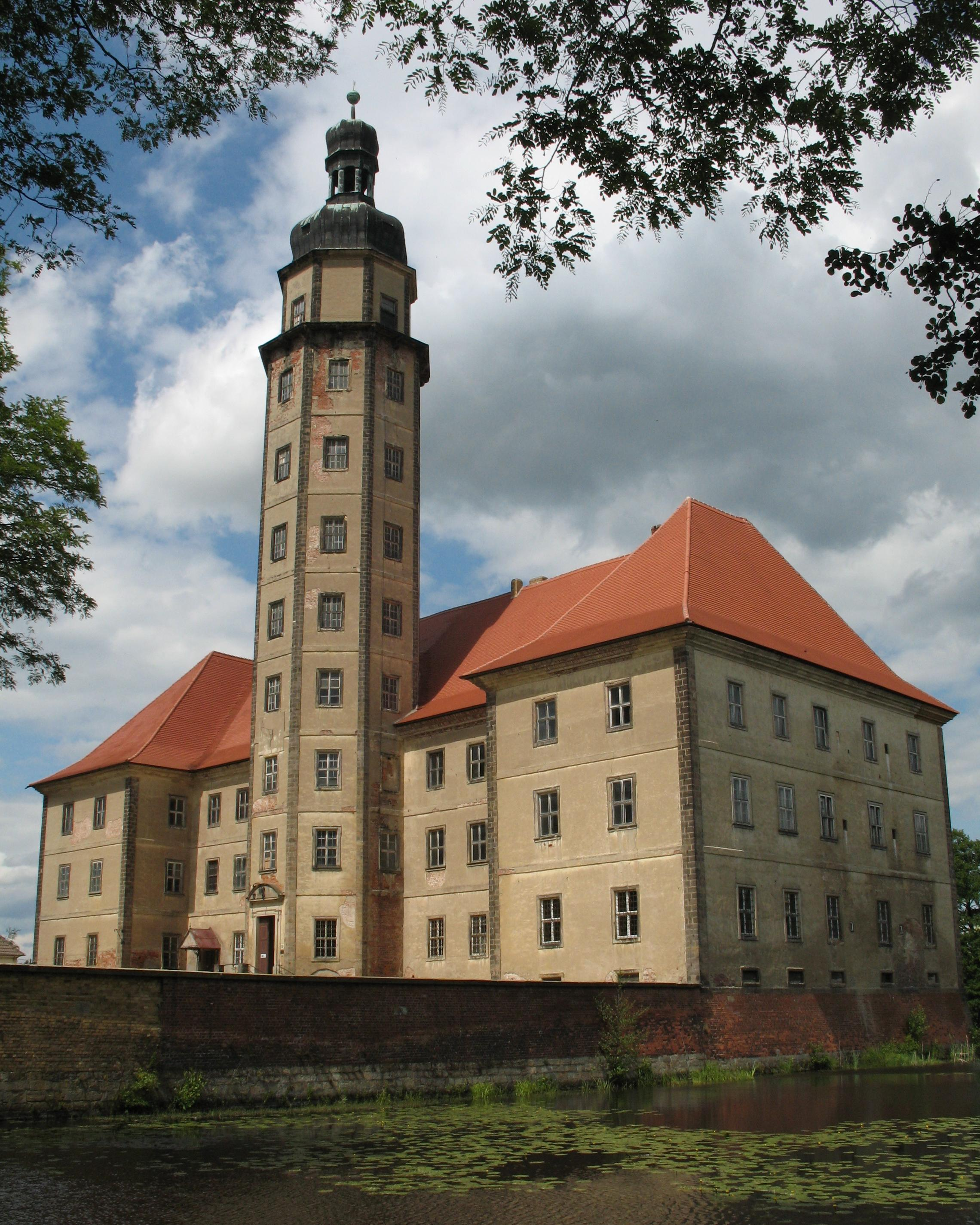
Castle Reinharz

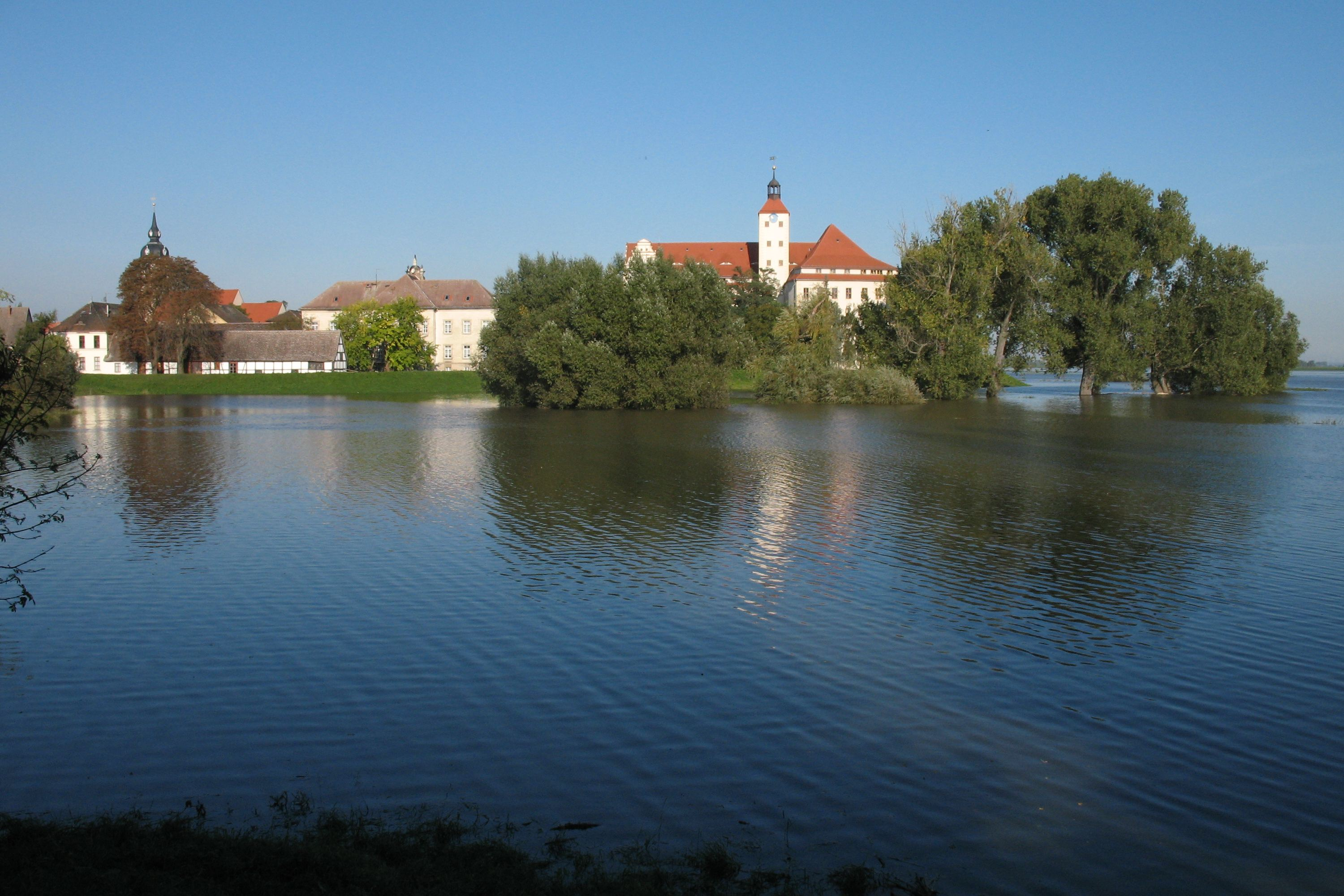
Elbe flood in Pretzsch
