= Düben Heath Nature Park =

Nature park in Germany

- Naturpark Dübener Heide
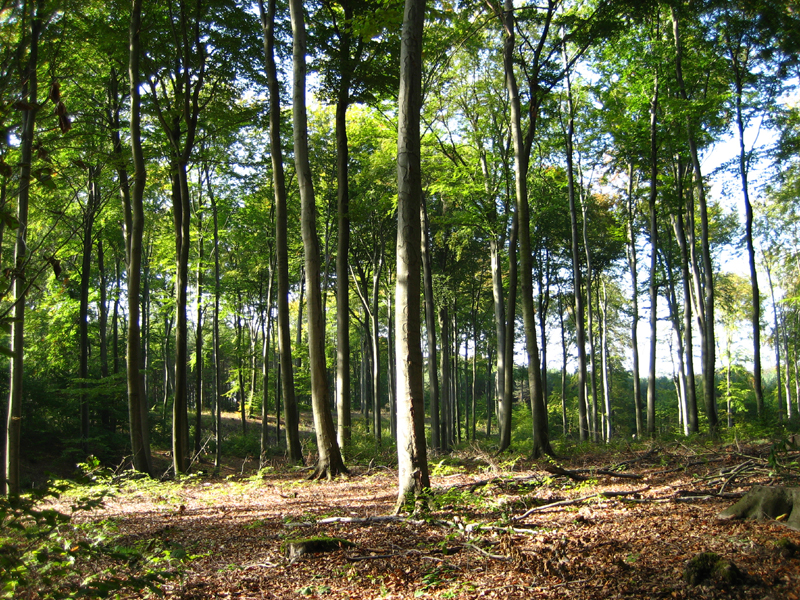
- Beech forest in the Düben Heath

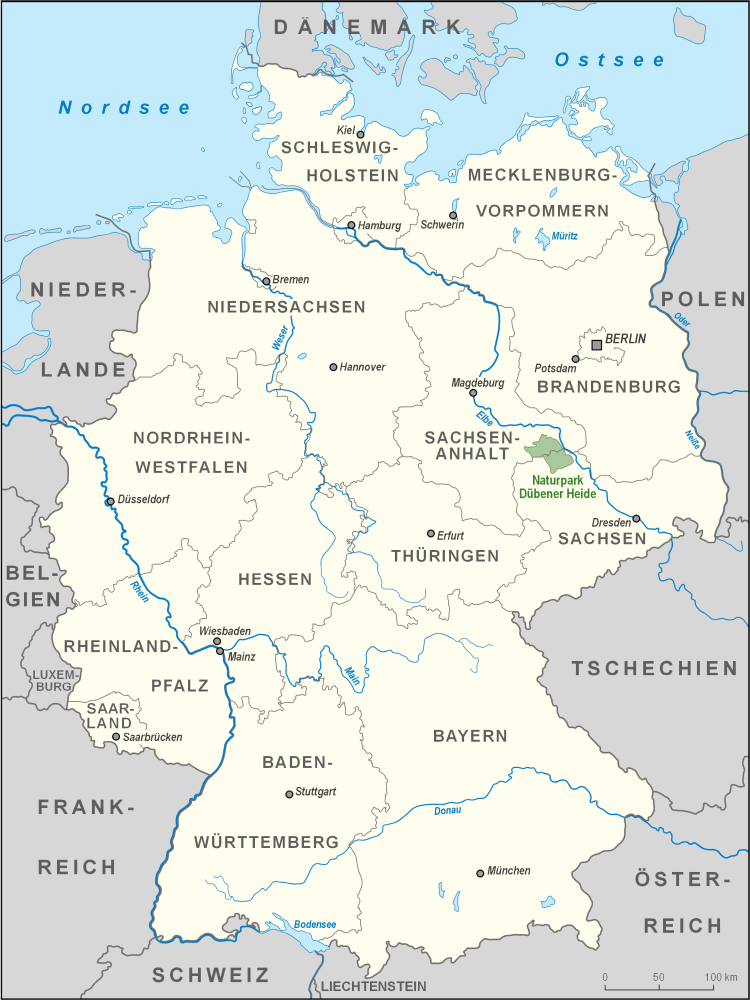
- Germany
- Nearest city: Bad Düben
- Coordinates: 51°41′17″N 12°44′15″E
- Area: 770 ha (1,900 acres)
- Established: 1992

The Düben Heath Nature Park (German: Naturpark Dübener Heide), which covers large areas of the eponymous Düben Heath, was the first nature park in Germany that resulted from a citizen's initiative and not from a government office. Around 1990, in order to prevent the further spreading and advancement of brown coal mining in the neighbourhood, the first citizens' initiatives were established for the protection and conservation of nature in the area.

The park is covered by a very varied, rolling heathland formed as a result of the Saale glaciation. It is a traditional excursion and recreation area in the relatively sparsely wooded heart of Central Germany. Its area is roughly evenly divided between the states of Saxony and Saxony-Anhalt, about midway between Wittenberg in the northeast and Leipzig in the southwest. Other major towns in the immediate vicinity are Dessau, Bitterfeld and Torgau. In the north and northeast the nature park is bounded by the floodplain of the Middle Elbe. On its western perimeter are the towns of Bitterfeld and Gräfenhainichen and the River Mulde. The interior of the park is accessible on the B 2 federal highway. It extends south as far as the B 87 with the towns of Eilenburg and Bad Düben. Geologically it is a landscape of terminal moraines and sandurs, composed predominantly of coniferous forest, mixed forest, lakes, bogs and grassland. The main species of tree is the pine.

The park covers about 770 square kilometres in toto and has a population of 68,400 (as at 31 Dec 2000) with a density of 89 inhabitants per km^{2}. 66% of the area is forest, 29% is used for agriculture, 2% are urban areas, 2% is water and 1% is used by industry and infrastructure. There are about 1,000 kilometres of designated cycle paths and hiking trails.

The nature park is supported by the Düben Heath Association (Verein Dübener Heide). The association, founded on 28 September 1930, was re-established on 31 March 1990. It is a member of the Association of German Nature Parks and the Association of German Mountain and Rambling Clubs.

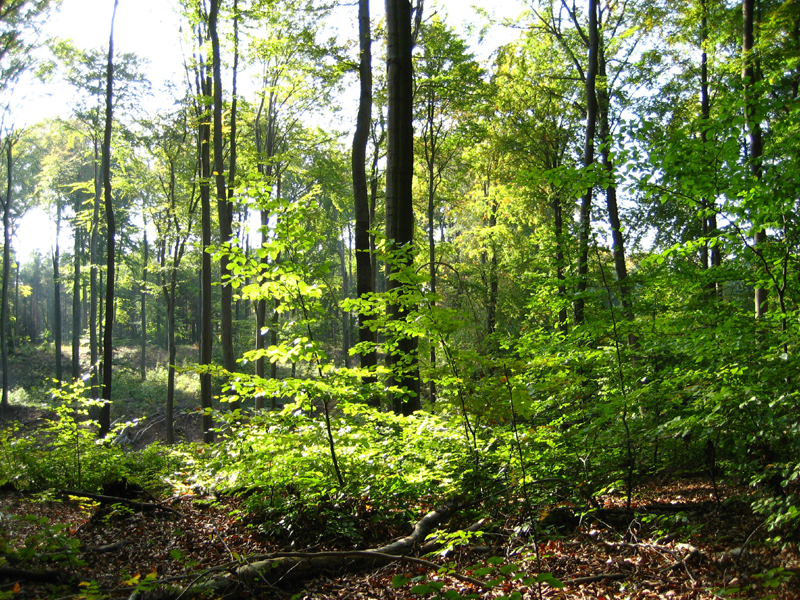
Open beech forest

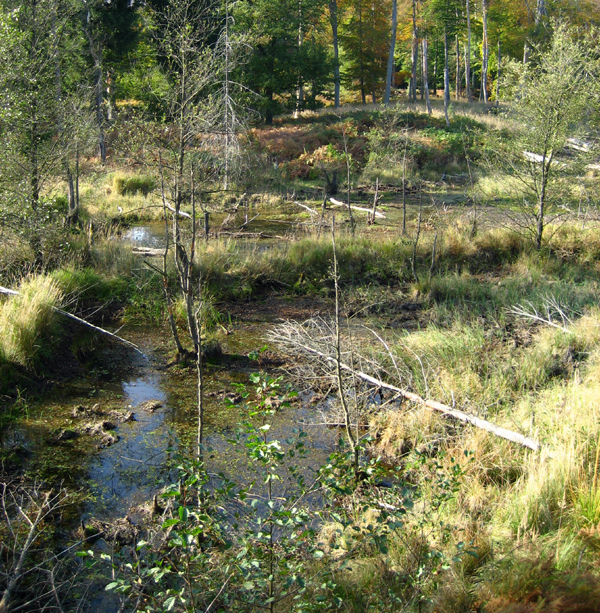
Pond

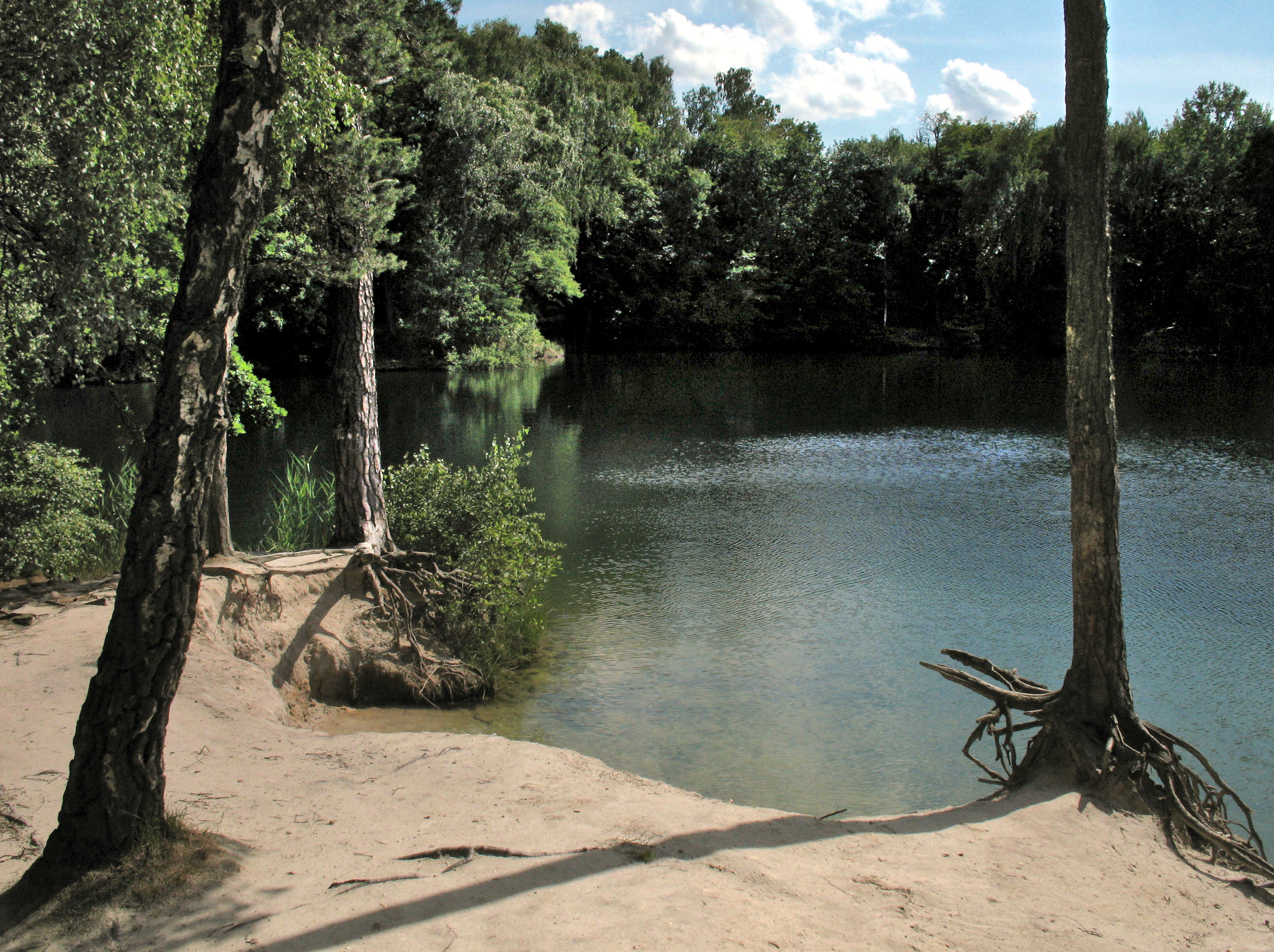
Blaues Auge near Bad Schmiedeberg

== See also ==
- List of nature parks in Germany
