= Pretzsch, Wittenberg =

Pretzsch
- Stadtteil of Bad Schmiedeberg
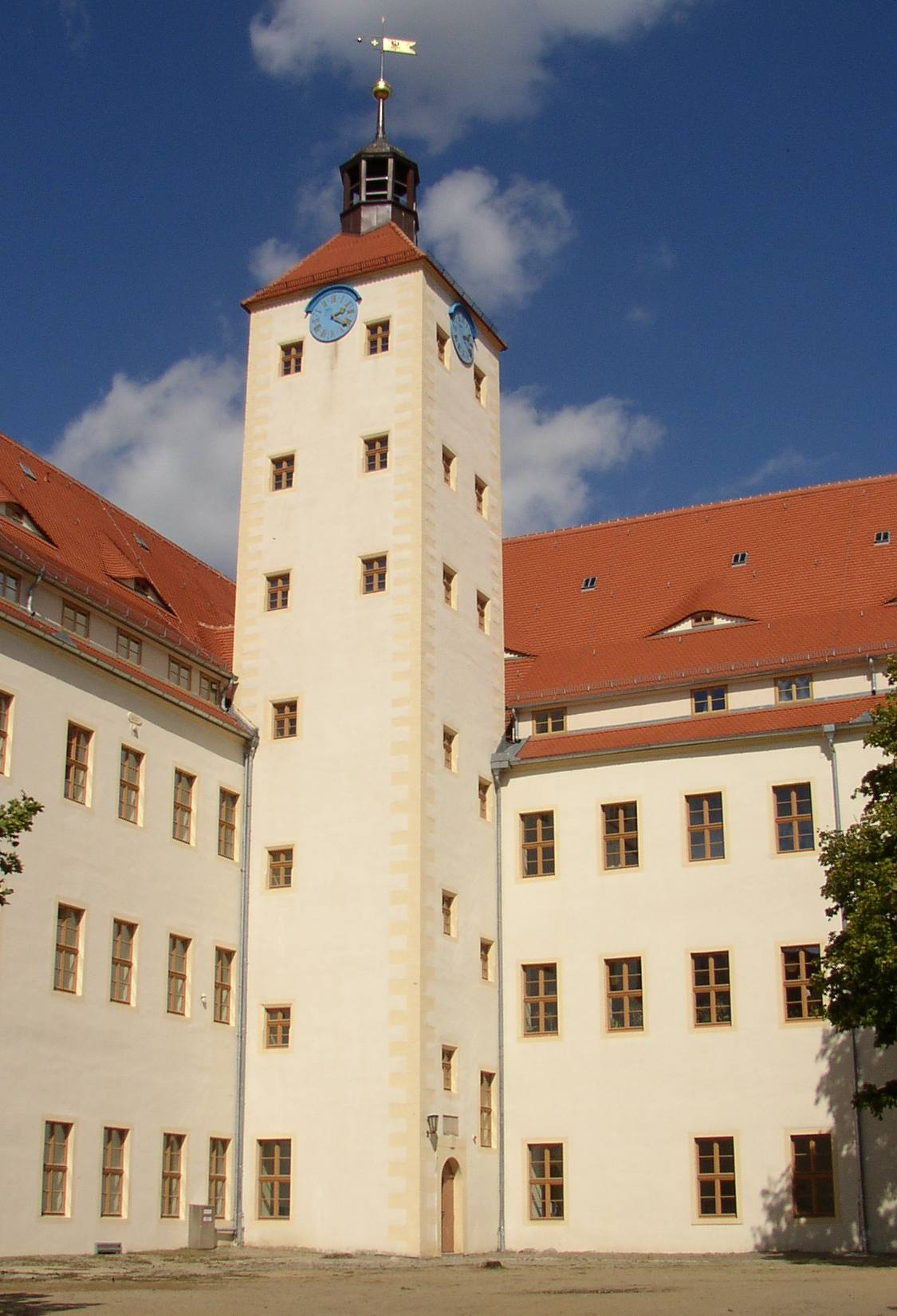

- Coat of arms
- Interactive map of Pretzsch
- Location within Germany Location within Saxony-Anhalt
- Coordinates: 51°43′N 12°48′E
- Country: Germany
- State: Saxony-Anhalt
- District: Wittenberg
- Town: Bad Schmiedeberg

Area
  - Total: 20.92 km^{2} (8.08 sq mi)
- Elevation: 70 m (230 ft)

Population (2006-12-31)
  - Total: 1,603
  - Density: 76.63/km^{2} (198.5/sq mi)
- Time zone: UTC+01:00 (CET)
  - Summer (DST): UTC+02:00 (CEST)
- Postal codes: 06909
- Dialling codes: 034926
- Vehicle registration: WB
- Website: www.pretzsch-elbe.de

Pretzsch (German pronunciation: [pʁɛtʃ]) is a small town and a former municipality in Wittenberg district in Saxony-Anhalt, Germany. Since 1 July 2009, it is part of the town Bad Schmiedeberg.

== Geography ==
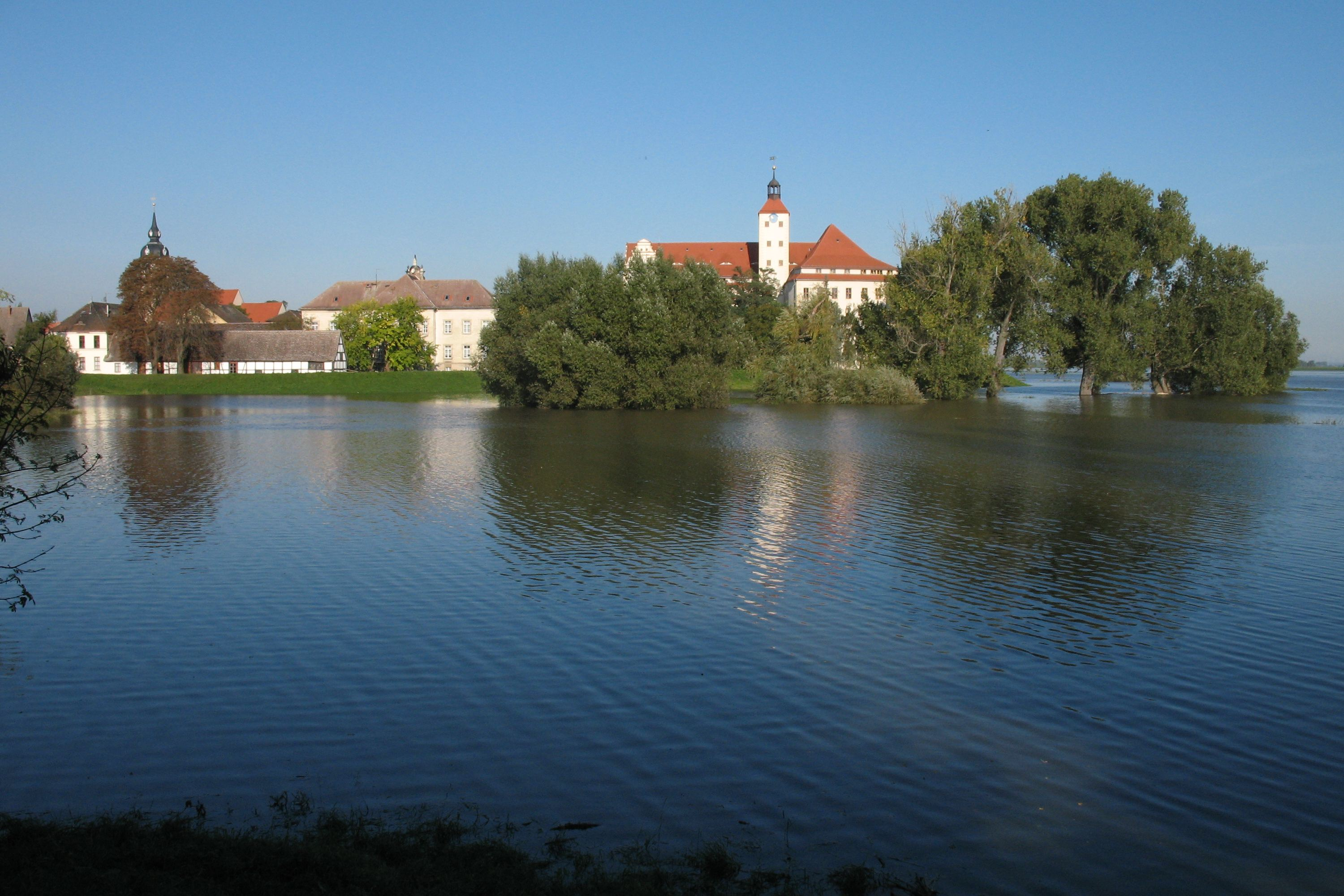
Flooded Elbauen

Pretzsch lies in the middle of the Elbauen (natural polders along the Elbe), on the river's west bank which is on the northwest edge of the Düben Heath Nature Park. It is about 20 km southeast of Wittenberg and is the intersection of Federal Highway (Bundesstraße) B 182 between Torgau and Wittenberg, and state road (Landesstraße) L 128 between Bad Schmiedeberg and Jessen.

== History ==
Pretzsch was first mentioned in 981 in one of Otto II's documents. In the 17th century, August II the Strong's wife Christiane Eberhardine of Brandenburg-Bayreuth lived there and is buried in the town church. In the 1930s, the writer Erwin Strittmatter worked at the local bakery. Until 1815, Pretzsch belonged to Saxony, and from then until the Second World War to the Prussian province of Saxony. As of 1952, when East Germany abolished the Land system, Pretzsch was in the Halle region, until 1990 when the Land system was revived in the former East Germany at German Reunification.

The SS Einsatzgruppen, the perpetrators of the initial phase of the Holocaust that preceded the invention of the more efficient Nazi death camp system, were first assembled at a police academy in Pretzsch in the spring of 1941.

== Subdivisions ==
Pretzsch includes the village of Merschwitz.

== Sightseeing ==
- Renaissance stately home from the 16th century
- Wieck'sches Haus from 1725
- Late Gothic church with Baroque additions by Matthäus Daniel Pöppelmann
- Heimatmuseum (half-timbered house) from the 18th century
- Pretzsch Bahnhof, the heritage railway station which starred in the 2009 film The Last Station, standing in for the station in Astapovo, Russia where Leo Tolstoy died.

== Personalities ==
- Friedrich Wieck (born 1785 in Pretzsch - died 6 October 1873 in Loschwitz near Dresden) was a German musician and music teacher.
- Paul Weinstein (athlete) (1878–1964) Olympic medalist in the high jump in the 1904 Games in St. Louis.

== Partner community ==
- (Germany) Heuchelheim, Hesse.

== See also ==
- Princess Eleonore Erdmuthe of Saxe-Eisenach
