= Gullies on Mars =

Incised networks of narrow channels and sediments on Mars

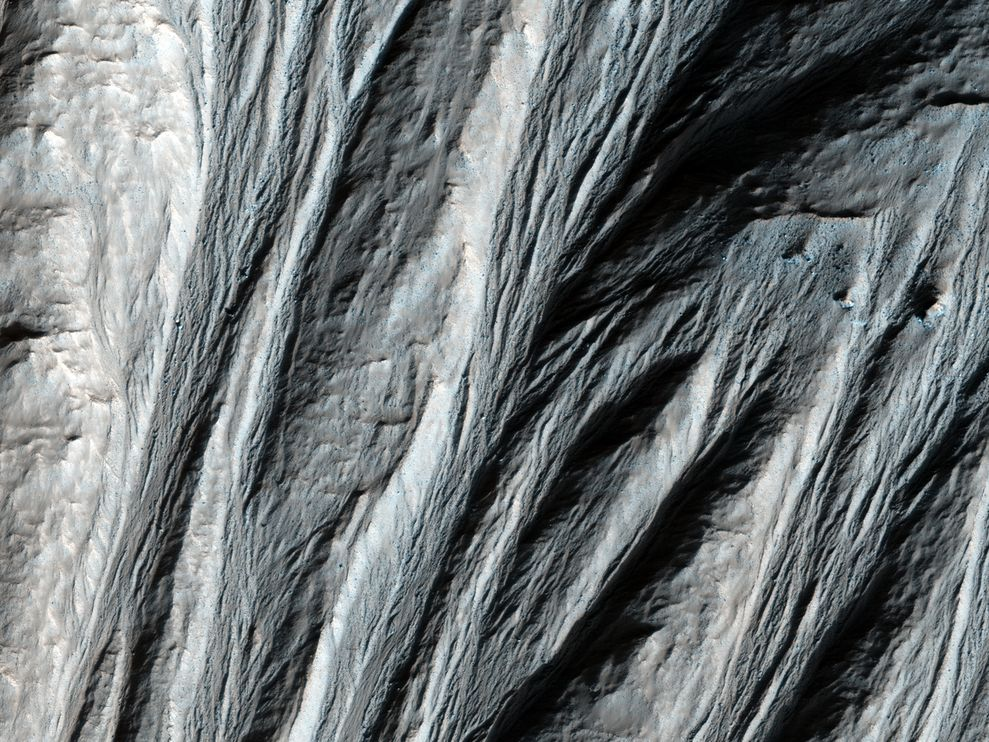
Gullies in the southern highlands of Mars, south of Argyre Planitia. 2014 image from the HiRISE camera on the Mars Reconnaissance Orbiter.

Martian gullies are small, incised networks of narrow channels and their associated downslope sediment deposits, found on the planet of Mars. They are named for their resemblance to terrestrial gullies. First discovered on images from Mars Global Surveyor, they occur on steep slopes, especially on the walls of craters. Usually, each gully has a dendritic alcove at its head, a fan-shaped apron at its base, and a single thread of incised channel linking the two, giving the whole gully an hourglass shape. They are estimated to be relatively young because they have few, if any craters. A subclass of gullies is also found cut into the faces of sand dunes, that are themselves considered to be quite young. Linear dune gullies are now considered recurrent seasonal features.

Most gullies occur 30 degrees poleward in each hemisphere, with greater numbers in the southern hemisphere. Some studies have found that gullies occur on slopes that face all directions; others have found that the greater number of gullies are found on poleward facing slopes, especially from 30° to 44° S. Although thousands have been found, they appear to be restricted to only certain areas of the planet. In the northern hemisphere, they have been found in Arcadia Planitia, Tempe Terra, Acidalia Planitia, and Utopia Planitia. In the south, high concentrations are found on the northern edge of Argyre basin, in northern Noachis Terra, and along the walls of the Hellas outflow channels. A recent study examined 54,040 CTX images that covered 85% of the Martian surface found 4861 separate gullied landforms (e.g., individual craters, mounds, valleys, etc.), which totaled tens of thousands of individual gullies. It is estimated that CTX can resolve 95% of gullies.

This article gives a history of the discovery and research on gullies. As research progresses, the cause of Martian gullies has shifted from recent liquid water to pieces of dry ice moving down steep slopes, but research continues. On the basis of their form, aspects, positions, and location amongst and apparent interaction with features thought to be rich in water ice, many researchers think that the processes carving the gullies involve liquid water. When the volumes of the aprons are compared to the rest of the gully, it appears that there is much less volume in the apron; hence, much of the material may have contained water and ice that disappeared.

Addition evidence that water is involved is that some gullies occur on slopes that are not steep enough for a dry flow, but would be steep enough if water was involved. Also, some gullies erode over 40 meters into bedrock, which so a long period of erosion is required—maybe more than dry ice could do.

However, this remains a topic of active research. Because the gullies are so young, this would suggest that liquid water has been present on Mars in its very recent geological past, with consequences for the potential habitability of the modern surface. On July 10, 2014, NASA reported that gullies on the surface of Mars were mostly formed by the seasonal freezing of carbon dioxide (CO_{2}), and not by that of liquid water as considered earlier.

== Formation ==
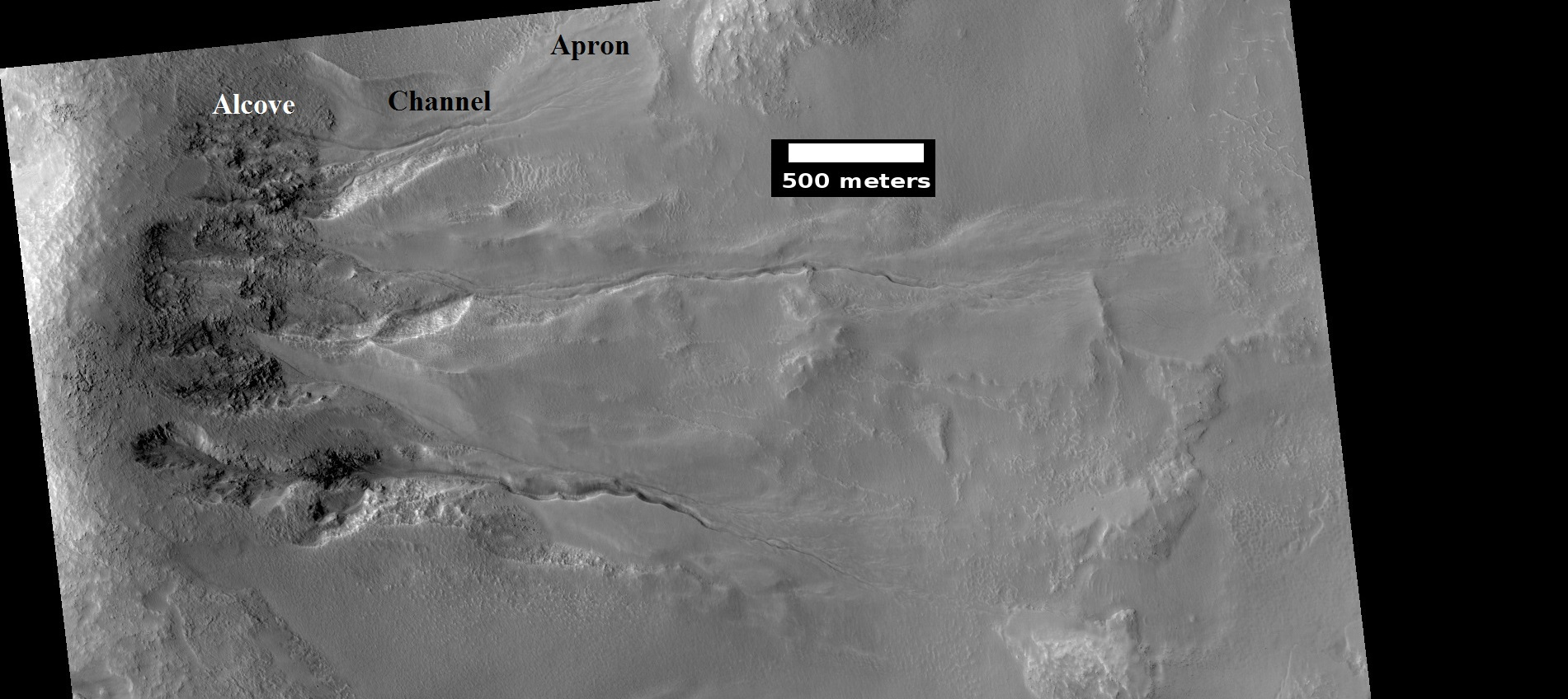
Image of gullies with main parts labeled. The main parts of a Martian gully are alcove, channel, and apron. Since there are no craters on this gully, it is thought to be rather young. Picture was taken by HiRISE under HiWish program. Location is Phaethontis quadrangle.

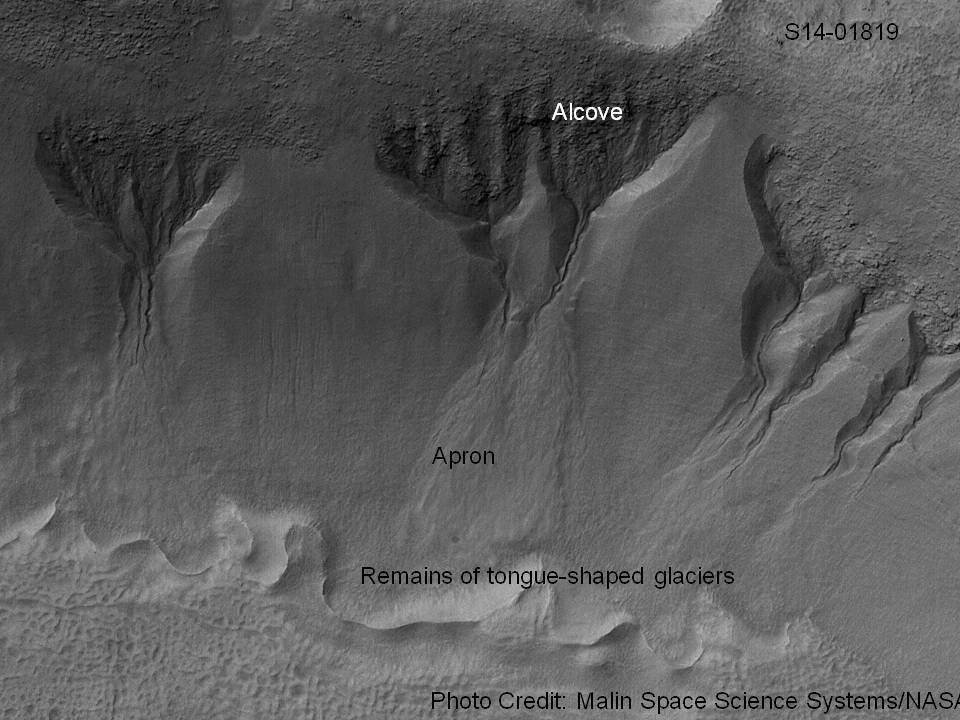
Group of gullies on north wall of crater that lies west of the crater Newton. The alcove and apron of one gully are labelled. These gullies are associated with moraine-like ridges at their downslope ends, which suggests they have formed at the site of a now-absent flowing ice. Note that they are cut into a mantle, which is much smoother than the rough-textured underlying material. Image taken by Mars Global Surveyor.

After being discovered, many hypotheses were put forward to explain the gullies. However, as in the usual progression of science, some ideas came to be more plausible than others when more observations were made, when other instruments were used, and when statistical analysis was employed. Even though some gullies resembled debris flows on Earth, it was found that many gullies were on slopes that were not steep enough for typical debris flows. Calculations showed that the pressure and temperatures were not right for liquid carbon dioxide. Moreover, the winding shape of the gullies suggested that the flows were slower than what would be produced in debris flows or eruptions of liquid carbon dioxide. Liquid carbon dioxide would explode out of the ground in the thin Martian atmosphere. Because the liquid carbon dioxide would throw material over 100 meters, the channels should be discontinuous, but they are not. Eventually, most hypotheses were narrowed to involve liquid water coming from an aquifer, from melting at the base of old glaciers (or snowpacks), or from the melting of ice in the ground when the climate was warmer.

Close-up images with HiRISE showed details that support the idea that a fluid was involved. Images show that channels were formed a number of times. Smaller channels were found in larger valleys, suggesting that after a valley formed another formed at a later time. Many cases showed channels took different paths at different times. Streamlined forms like teadrop-shaped islands were common in some channels. The following group of pictures of gullies illustrate some of the shapes that lead researchers to think that water was involved in creating at least some of the gullies.

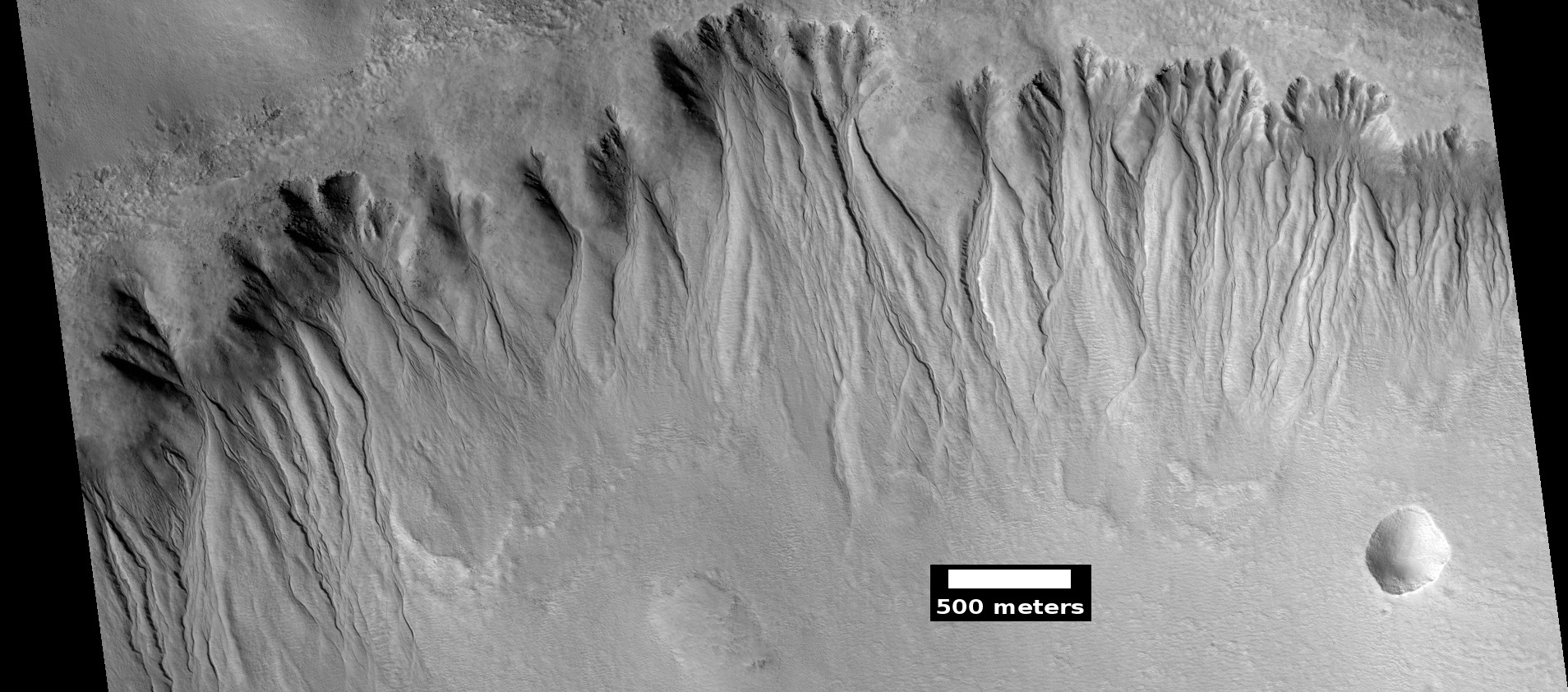
Gullies on wall of crater, as seen by HiRISE under HiWish program Location is the Mare Acidalium quadrangle.

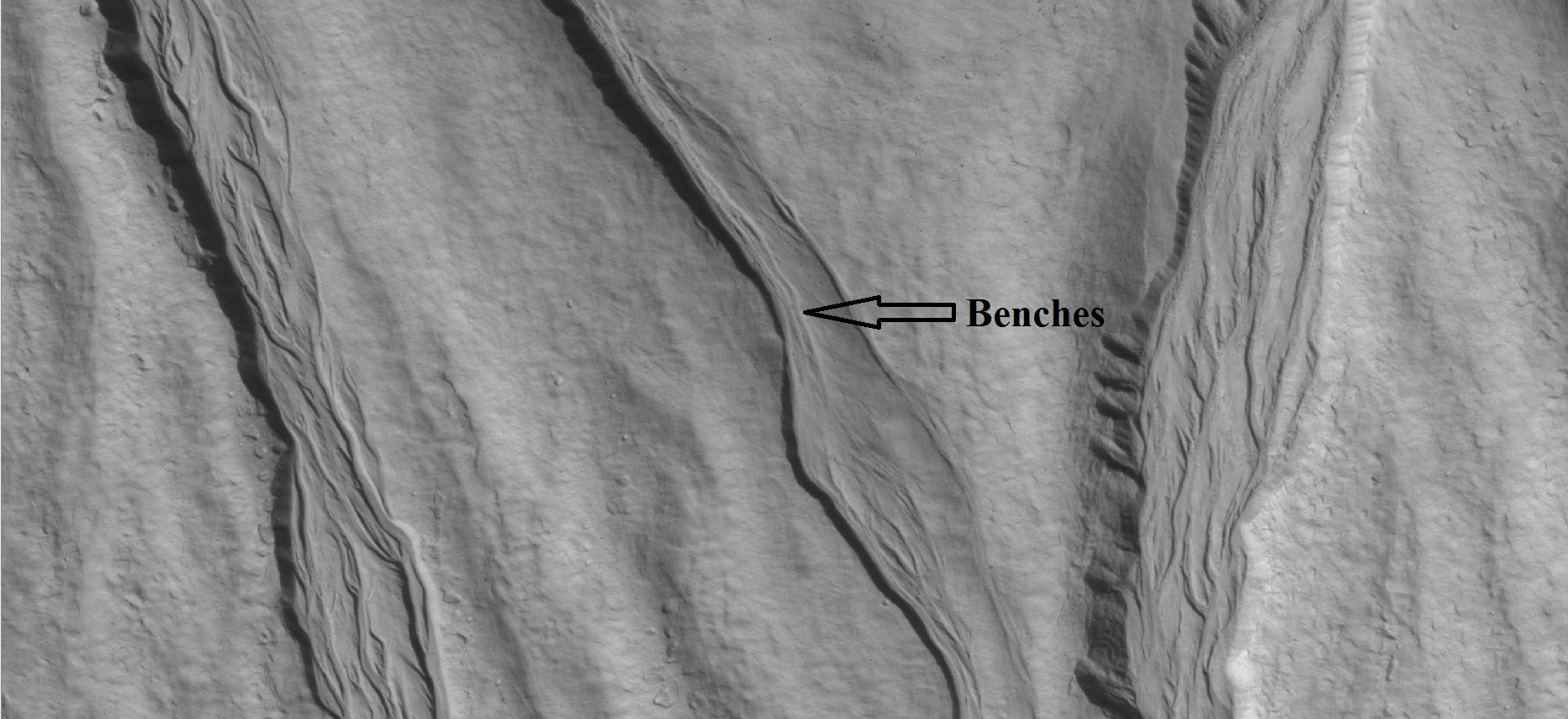
Close-up of gully channels, as seen by HiRISE under HiWish program. This image shows many streamlined forms and some benches along a channel. These features suggest formation by running water. Benches are usually formed when the water level goes down a bit and stays at that level for a time. Picture was taken with HiRISE under HiWish program. Location is the Mare Acidalium quadrangle. Note this is an enlargement of a previous image.

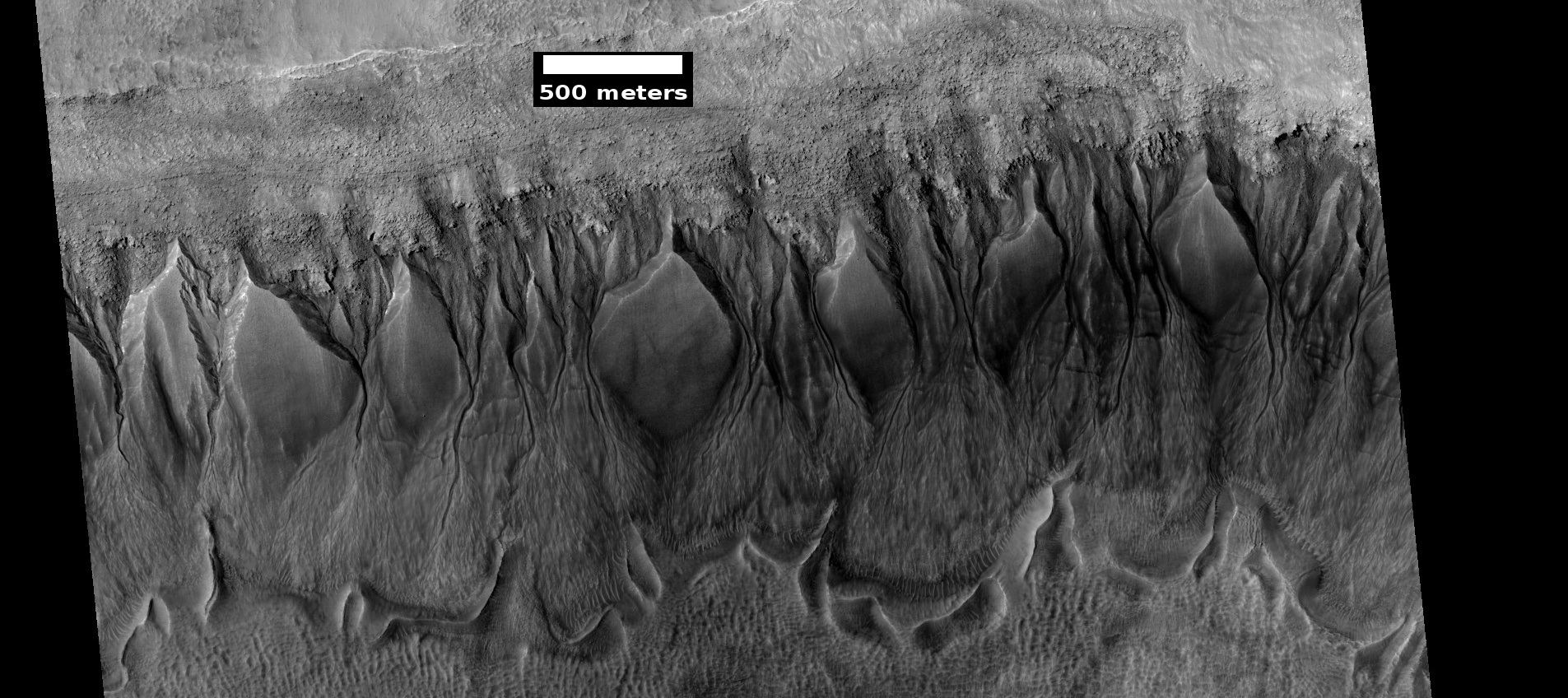
Gullies in crater in Phaethontis quadrangle, as seen by HiRISE under HiWish program

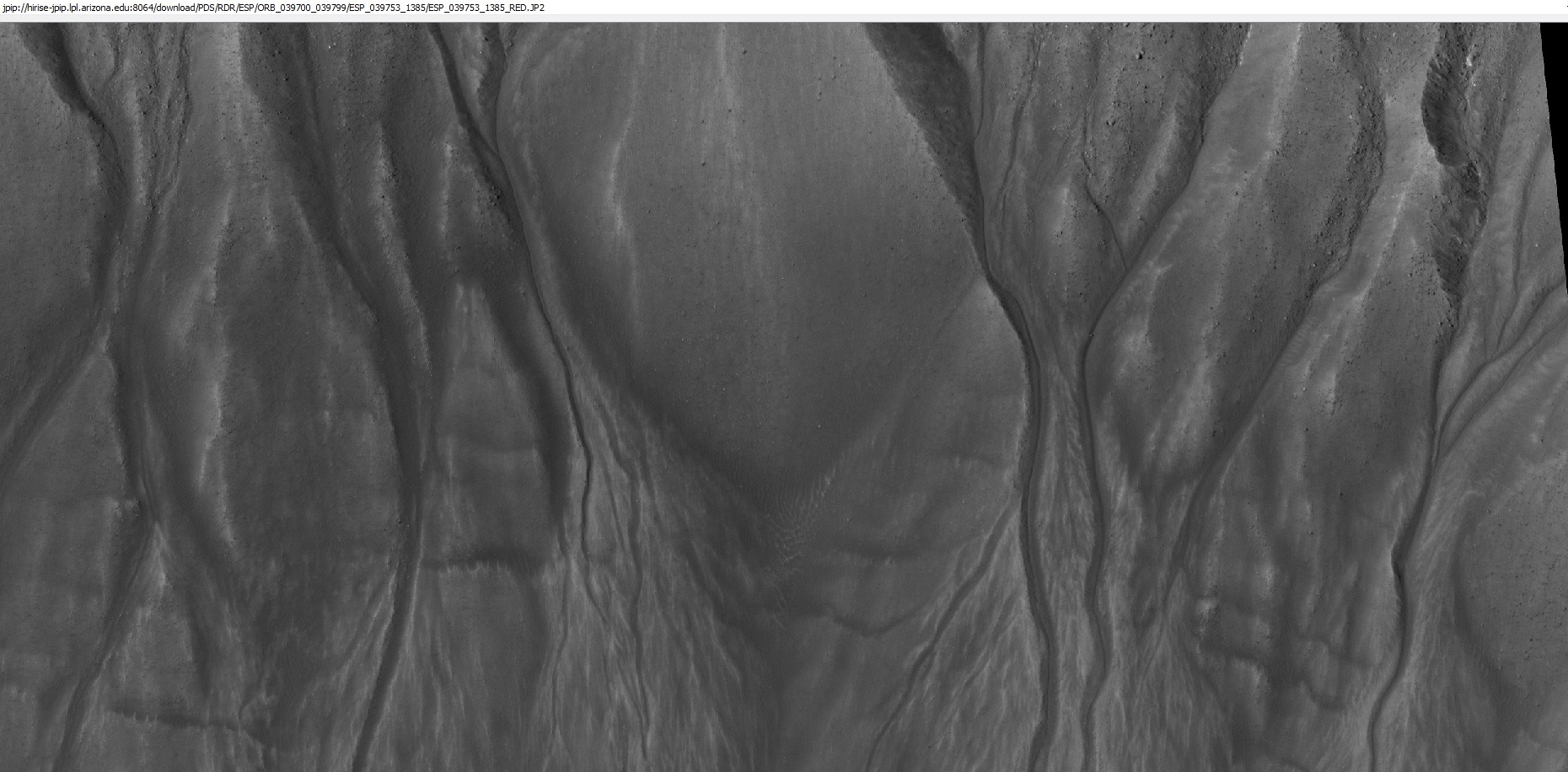
Close-up of channels in gullies showing that the paths of the channels changed over time. This feature suggest formation by running water with a high load of sediment. Picture was taken with HiRISE under HiWish program. Location is the Mare Acidalium quadrangle. Note this is an enlargement of a previous image in Phaethontis quadrangle.

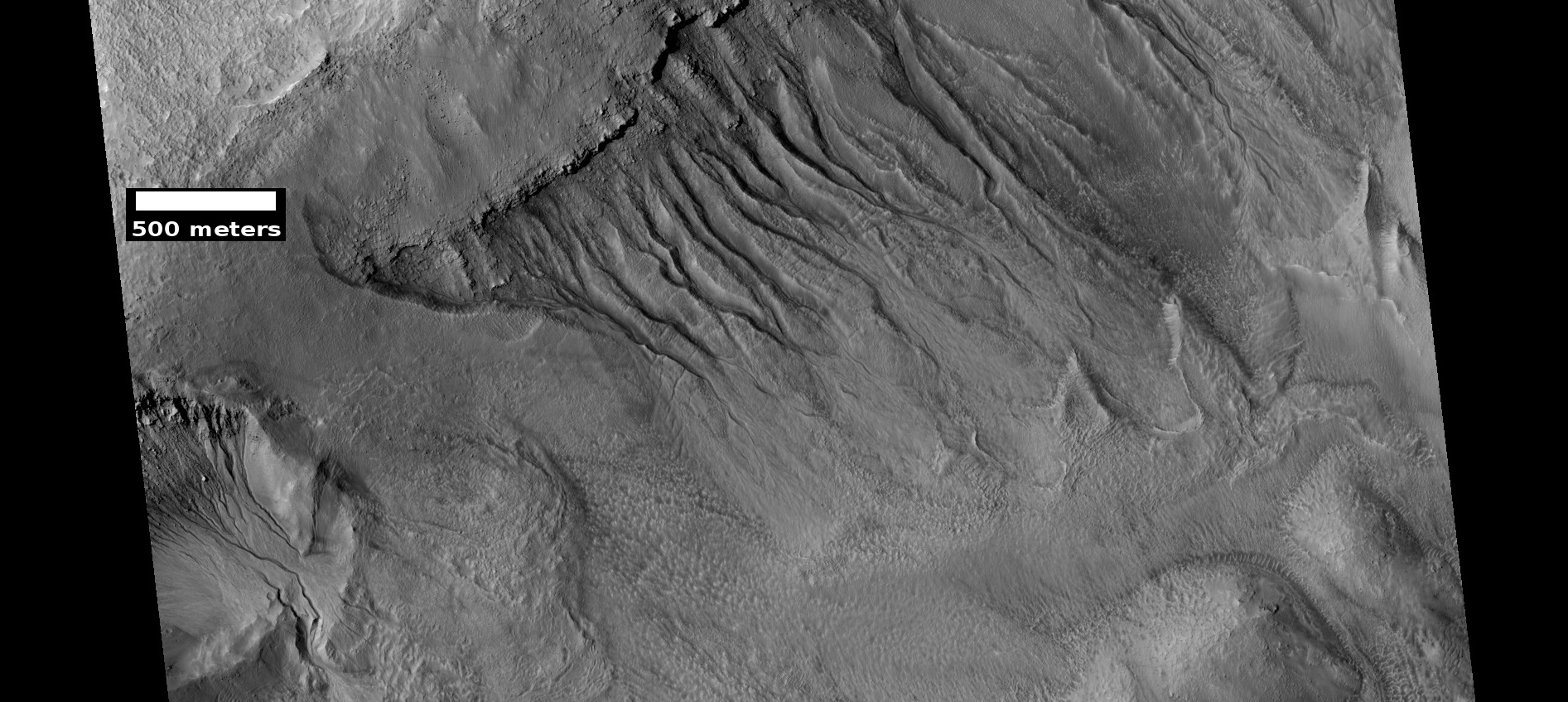
Gullies in crater, as seen by HiRISE under HiWish program. Location is Eridania quadrangle.

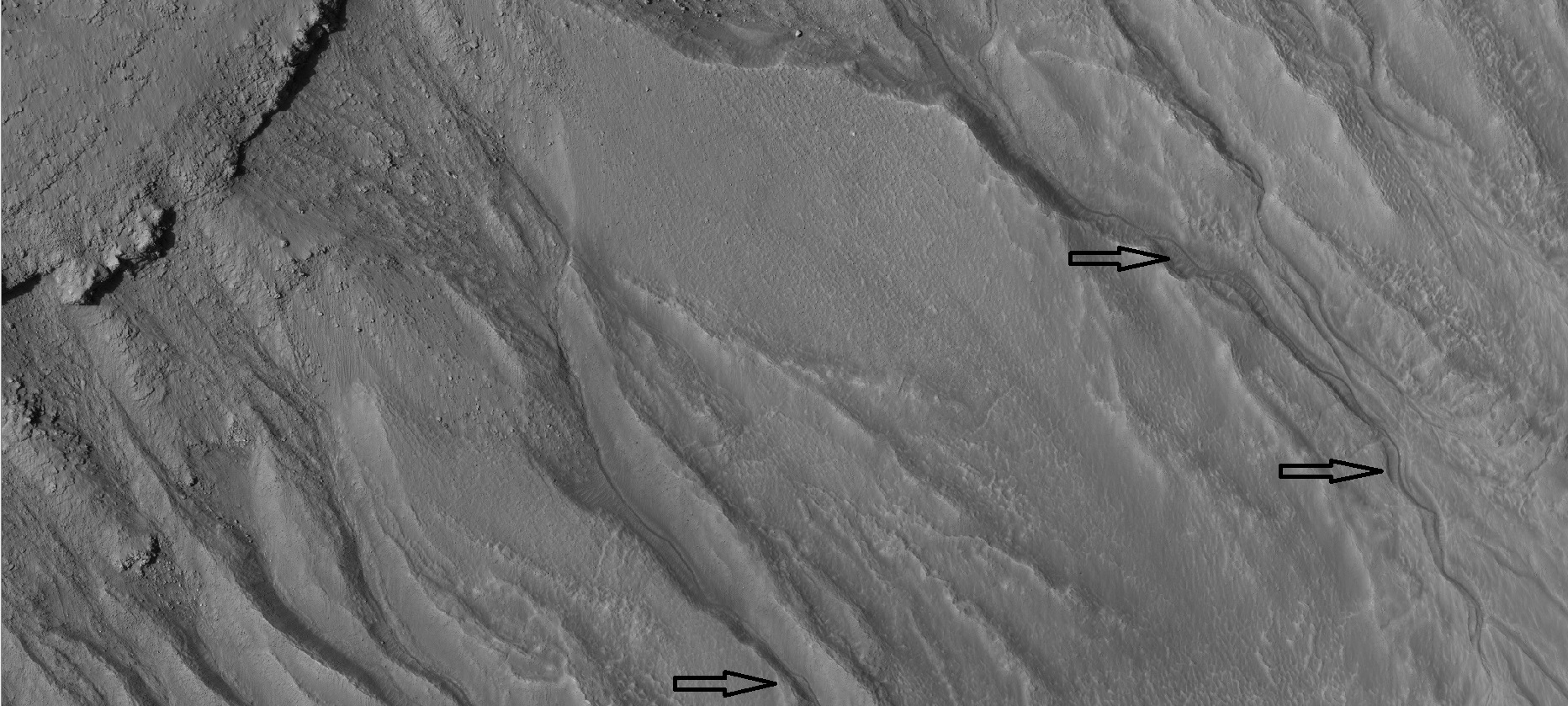
Close-up of gullies in crater showing channels within larger valleys and curves in channels. These characteristics suggest they were made by flowing water. Note: this is an enlargement of the previous image by HiRISE under HiWish program. Location is Eridania quadrangle.

However, more studies open up other possibilities; a study released in October 2010, proposes that some gullies, the ones on sand dunes, may be produced by a buildup of solid carbon dioxide during cold winter months.

On July 10, 2014, NASA reported that gullies on the surface of Mars were mostly formed by the seasonal freezing of carbon dioxide (CO_{2} ice or 'dry ice'), and not by that of liquid water as thought earlier.

The exact cause/causes of these gullies is still under debate. A study supported formation by the melting of ground ice or snowpack as the chief cause. Over 54,000 CTX images were examined which covered about 85% of the surface of the planet.

=== Aquifers ===
Most of the gully alcove heads occur at the same level, just as one would expect if water came out of an aquifer. Various measurements and calculations show that liquid water could exist in aquifers at the usual depths where gullies begin. One variation of this model is that rising hot magma could have melted ice in the ground and caused water to flow in aquifers. Aquifers are layers that allow water to flow. They may consist of porous sandstone. The aquifer layer would be perched on top of another layer that prevents water from going down (in geological terms it would be called impermeable). Because water in an aquifer is prevented from going down, the only direction the trapped water can flow is horizontally. Eventually, water could flow out onto the surface when the aquifer reaches a break—like a crater wall. The resulting flow of water could erode the wall to create gullies. Aquifers are quite common on Earth. A good example is "Weeping Rock" in Zion National Park Utah. However, the idea that aquifers formed the gullies does not explain the ones found on isolated peaks, like knobs and the central peaks of craters. Also, a type of gully seems to be present on sand dunes. Aquifers need a wide collecting area which is not present on sand dunes or on isolated slopes. Even though most of the original gullies that were seen seemed to come from the same layer in the slope, some exceptions to this pattern have been found. Examples of gullies coming from different levels is shown below in the image of Lohse Crater and the image of gullies in Ross Crater.

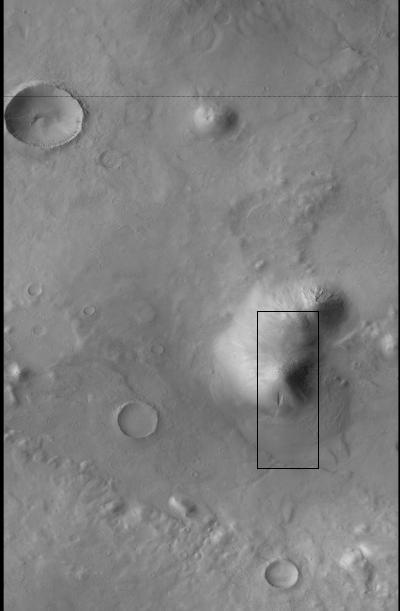
CTX image of the next image showing a wide view of the area. Since the hill is isolated it would be difficult for an aquifer to develop. Rectangle shows the approximate location of the next image.

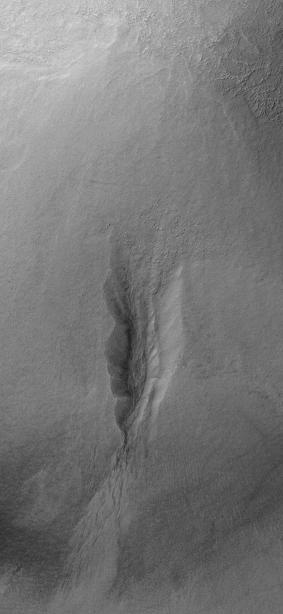
Gully on mound as seen by Mars Global Surveyor, under the MOC Public Targeting Program. Images of gullies on isolated peaks, like this one, are difficult to explain with the theory of water coming from aquifers because aquifers need large collecting areas.

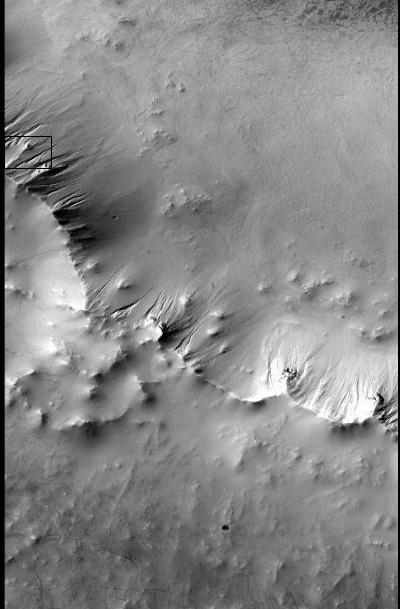
CTX image of part of Ross Crater showing context for next image from HiRISE.

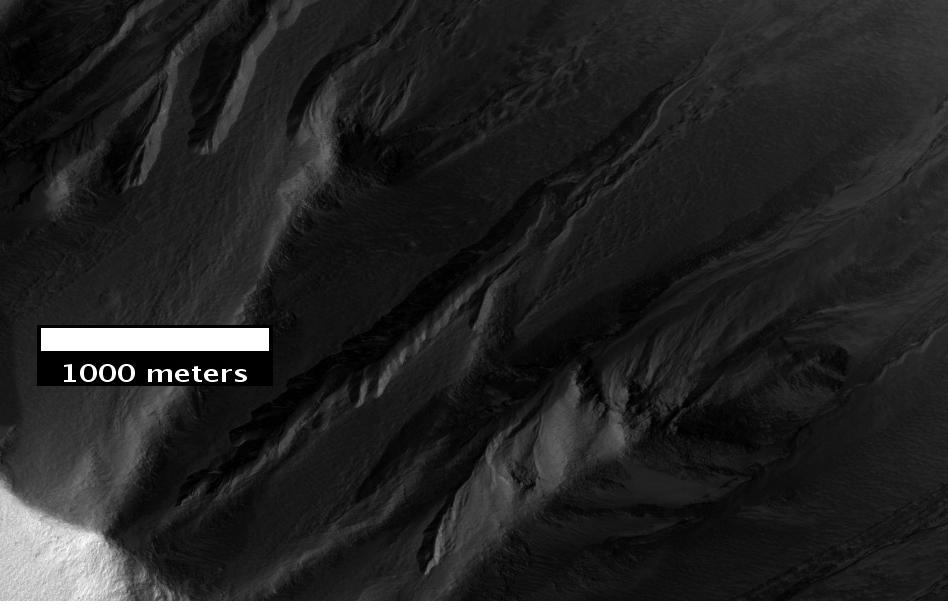
Gullies in Ross Crater, as seen by HiRISE under the HiWish program. Because the gullies are on the narrow rim of a crater and they start at different heights, this example is not consistent with the model of gullies being caused by aquifers.

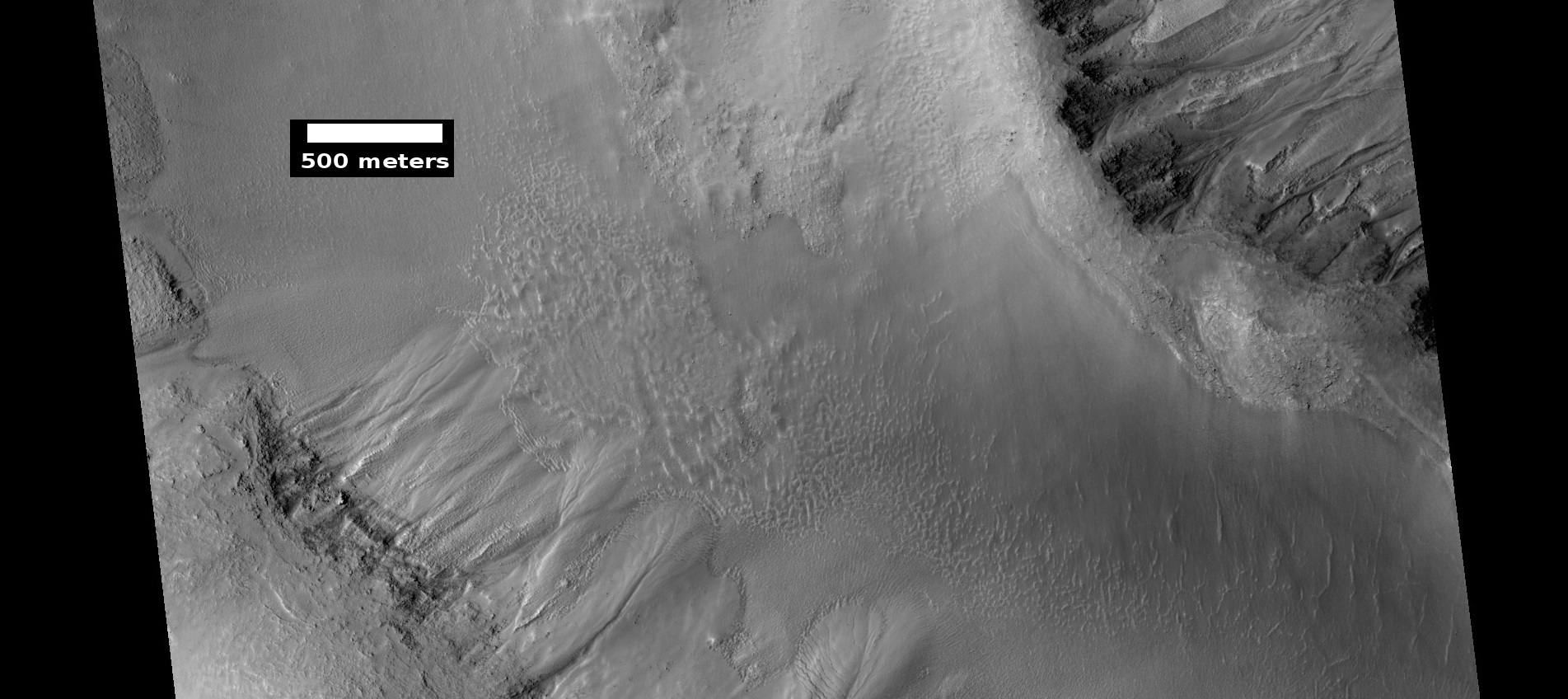
Gullies in two levels of a crater wall, as seen by HiRISE under HiWish program. Gullies at two levels suggests they were not made with an aquifer, as was first suggested. Location is Phaethontis quadrangle.

Lohse Crater Gullies on Central Peak. Image located in Argyre quadrangle. Having gullies on a central peak runs counter to the idea that they were formed by an aquifer, as was first suggested. An aquifer could not exist on a small peak.

=== Snowpacks ===
Much of the surface of Mars is covered by a thick smooth mantle that is thought to be a mixture of ice and dust. This ice-rich mantle, a few yards thick, smooths the land, but in places it has a bumpy texture, resembling the surface of a basketball. The mantle may be like a glacier and under certain conditions the ice that is mixed in the mantle could melt and flow down the slopes and make gullies. Calculations show that a third of a mm of runoff can be produced each day for 50 days of each Martian year even under current conditions. Because there are few craters on this mantle, the mantle is thought to be relatively young. An excellent view of this mantle is shown below in the picture of the Ptolemaeus Crater Rim, as seen by HiRISE.

The ice-rich mantle may be the result of climate changes. Changes in Mars's orbit and tilt cause significant changes in the distribution of water ice from polar regions down to latitudes equivalent to Texas. During certain climate periods water vapor leaves polar ice and enters the atmosphere. The water comes back to ground at lower latitudes as deposits of frost or snow mixed generously with dust. The atmosphere of Mars contains a great deal of fine dust particles. Water vapor will condense on the particles, then fall down to the ground due to the additional weight of the water coating. When Mars is at its greatest tilt or obliquity, up to 2 cm of ice could be removed from the summer ice cap and be deposited at midlatitudes. This movement of water could last for several thousand years and create a snow layer of up to around 10 meters thick. When ice at the top of the mantling layer goes back into the atmosphere, it leaves behind dust, which insulates the remaining ice.

When the slopes, orientations, and elevations of thousands of gullies were compared, clear patterns emerged from the data. Measurements of altitudes and slopes of gullies support the idea that snowpacks or glaciers are associated with gullies. Steeper slopes have more shade which would preserve snow. Higher elevations have far fewer gullies because ice would tend to sublimate more in the thin air of the higher altitude. For example, Thaumasia quadrangle is heavily cratered with many steep slopes. It is in the right latitude range, but its altitude is so high that there is not enough pressure to keep ice from sublimating (going directly from a solid to a gas); hence it does not have gullies. A large study done with several years worth of data from Mars Global Surveyor showed that there is a tendency for gullies to be on poleward facing slopes; these slopes have more shade that would keep snow from melting and allow large snowpacks to accumulate.

In general, it is now estimated that during periods of high obliquity, the ice caps will melt causing higher temperature, pressure, and moisture. The moisture will then accumulate as snow in midlatitudes, especially in the more shaded areas—pole facing, steep slopes. At a certain time of the year, sunlight will melt snow with the resulting water producing gullies.

Direct evidence for these snowpacks was recently discovered for the first time, showing that this mantle is indeed composed of <~1% dust and ice Changes observed within gullies over multiple Mars Years shows that dusty ice being exposed today is disappearing, and potentially melting to form channels within the mantle, and the rock underneath.

=== Melting of ground (pore) ice ===
The third theory is that climate changes may be enough to allow ice deposited from atmospheric vapor into the ground to melt and thus form the gullies. During a warmer climate, the first few meters of ground could thaw and produce a "debris flow" similar to those on the dry and cold Greenland east coast. Since the gullies occur on steep slopes only a small decrease of the shear strength of the soil particles is needed to begin the flow. Small amounts of liquid water from melted ground ice could be enough to lead to erosion. However, it is likely that ice deposited in the pores of soil in the ground will diffuse back into the atmosphere rather than melt. Similar pore ice diffusion was also observed in-situ at the Phoenix landing site

In support for ground ice being involved, a group of researchers found that gullies are preferentially distributed on areas with some ground ice rather than no ice at all. A large data set of gullies was used in this study.

=== Recent changes in gullies ===
As soon as gullies were discovered, researchers began to image many gullies over and over, looking for possible changes. By 2006, some changes were found. Later, with further analysis it was determined that the changes could have occurred by dry granular flows rather than being driven by flowing water. With continued observations many more changes were found in Gasa Crater and others. Channels widened by 0.5 to 1 m; meter sized boulders moved; and hundreds of cubic meters of material moved. It was calculated that gullies could be formed under present conditions with as little as 1 event in 50–500 years. So, although today there is little liquid water, present geological/climatic processes could still form gullies. Large amounts of water or great changes in climate are not needed. However, some gullies in the past may have been aided by weather changes that involved larger amounts of water, perhaps from melted snow. With more repeated observations, more and more changes have been found; since the changes occur in the winter and spring, experts are tending to suspect that gullies were formed from carbon dioxide ice (dry ice). Recent studies describe using the High Resolution Imaging Science Experiment (HiRISE) camera on MRO to examine gullies at 356 sites, starting in 2006. Thirty-eight of the sites showed active gully formation. Before-and-after images demonstrated the timing of this activity coincided with seasonal carbon dioxide frost and temperatures that would not have allowed for liquid water. When dry ice frost changes to a gas, it may lubricate dry material to flow especially on steep slopes. In some years frost, perhaps as thick as 1 meter, triggers avalanches. This frost contains mostly dry ice, but also has tiny amounts of water ice.

Observations with HiRISE show widespread activity in southern hemisphere gullies, especially in those that appear fresh. Significant channel incision and large-scale mass movements have been seen. Sinuous channels which were thought to need liquid water for their formation have even been seen to form over just a few years when liquid water cannot exist. The timing of gully activity is seasonal and happens during the period when seasonal frost is present and defrosting.

These observations support a model in which currently active gully formation is driven mainly by seasonal CO_{2} frost. Simulations described in a 2015 conference, show that high pressure CO_{2} gas trapping in the subsurface can cause debris flows. The conditions that can lead to this are found in latitudes where gullies occur. This research was described in a later article entitled, "Formation of gullies on Mars by debris flows triggered by CO2 sublimation." In the model, CO_{2} ice accumulates in the cold winter. It piles up on a frozen permafrost layer that consists of ice-cemented dirt. When the higher intensity sunlight of spring begins, light penetrates the translucent dry ice layer, consequently warming the ground. The CO_{2} ice absorbs heat and sublimates—that is changes directly from a solid to a gas. This gas builds up pressure because it is trapped between the ice and the frozen ground. Eventually, pressure builds up enough to explode through the ice taking with it soil particles. The dirt particles mix with the pressurized gas and act as a fluid that can flow down the slope and carve gullies.

Observations of gullies that are on sand dunes support the idea that current gully changes may be caused by dry ice. Some gullies on sand dunes have even been observed to change noticeably in just one year. Dry ice, or solid carbon dioxide, accumulates in the cold winter and then when it is starting to warm up, changes appear in gullies. It is thought that dry ice could be causing a flow in the sand as it sublimates; the carbon dioxide gas released would speed up the flow. A team of researchers examined changes in a sand dune gully in Matara Crater (49.5°S; 34.9°E - Noachis quadrangle) for 5 years. Each year there were changes. The changes were in the length of the gully, the curviness of the gully, and changes in the volume both the alcove and the apron. The alcove lost material, while the apron gained. In just one Martian year, the apron went from a length of 800 meters to a length of nearly 940 meters.

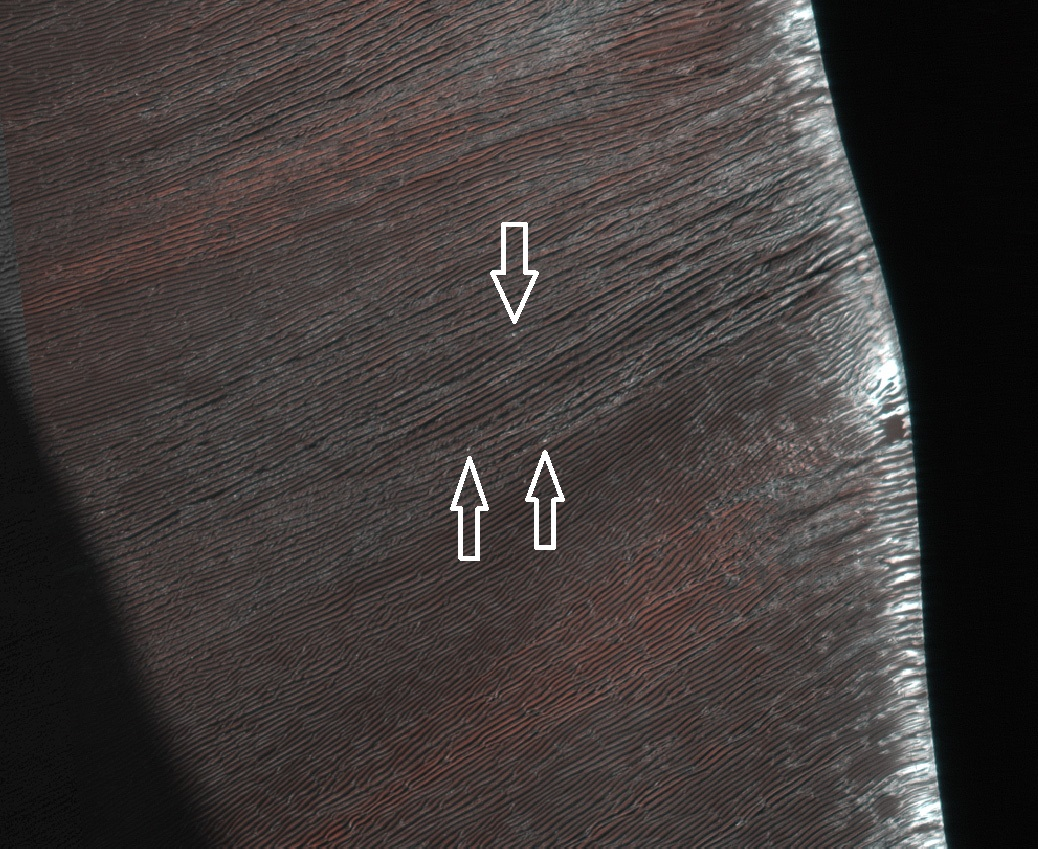
Channels on sand dunes, as seen by HiRISE. Arrows show chunks of ice that moved down to enlarge gullies.

The major issue with the CO_{2} frost model is trying to explain the erosion of rocks. Although there is considerable evidence for CO_{2} frost transporting loose materials, it seems unlikely that sublimating CO_{2} gas can erode and weather rocks to form gullies. Instead, CO_{2} frost might only be able to modify pre-existing gullies.

Using data from the Compact Reconnaissance Imaging Spectrometer for Mars (CRISM) and High Resolution Imaging Science Experiment (HiRISE) on the Mars Reconnaissance Orbiter researchers studied over 100 Martian gully sites and found no evidence for specific minerals being more likely to be associated with gullies, or with the formation of hydrated minerals that would have been made by recent liquid water. This research adds evidence that liquid water was not involved with gully formation. However, as described above, the amounts of liquid water thought to be generated in near-freezing conditions from melting snowpacks are unlikely to cause chemical weathering in the first place.

Some researchers believe that gully formation may involve both dry ice and liquid water, especially in the past.

=== How changing tilt affects the climate ===
It is estimated that a few million years ago, the tilt of the axis of Mars was 45 degrees instead of its present 25 degrees. Its tilt, also called obliquity, varies greatly because its two tiny moons cannot stabilize it, like our relatively large moon does to the Earth. During such periods of high tilt, the summer rays of the sun strike the mid-latitude crater surfaces straight on, thus the surface remains dry.

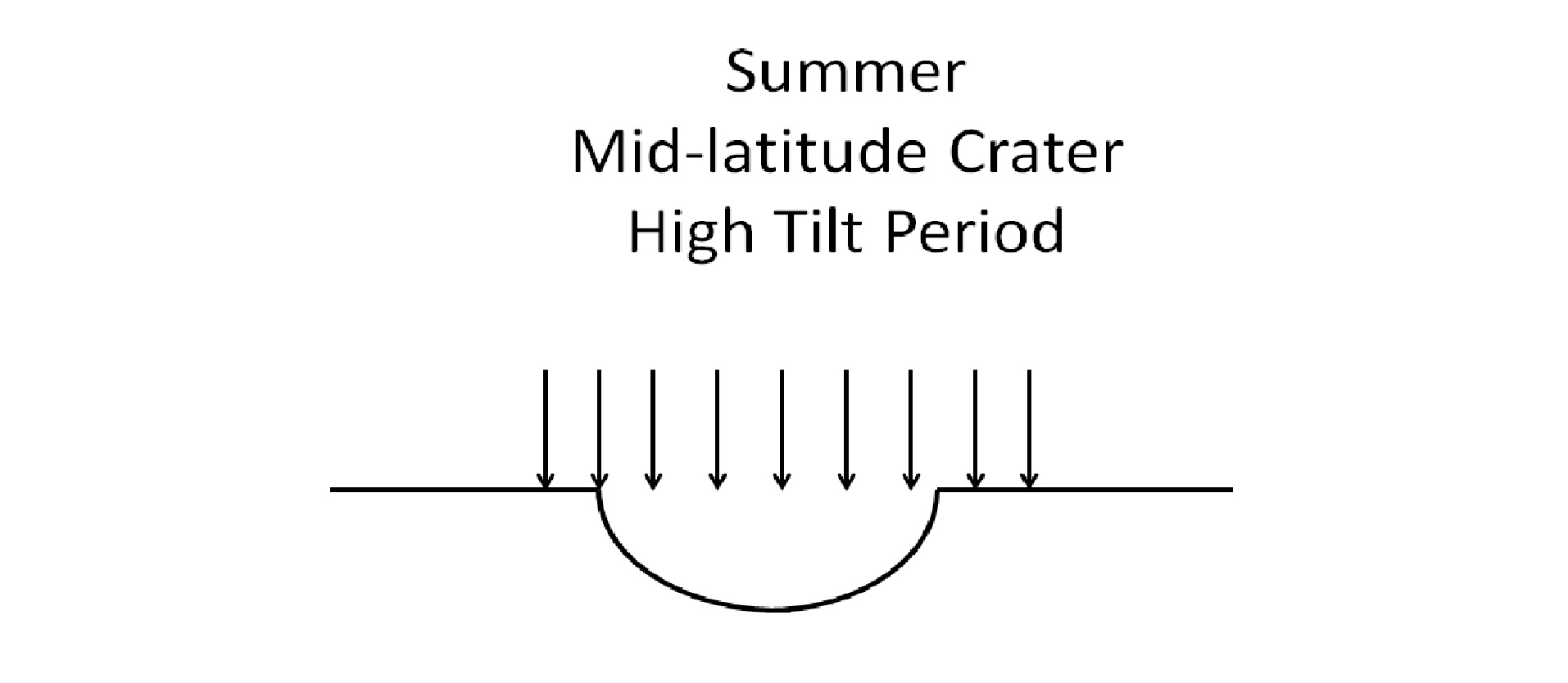
The straight on rays of the sun prevent snow from accumulating in mid-latitude craters when the tilt of Mars is high.

Note that at high tilt, the ice caps at the poles disappear, the atmosphere thickness, and the moisture in the atmosphere goes up. These conditions cause snow and frost to appear on the surface. However, any snow that falls at night and during the cooler parts of the day disappears when the day warms.

Things are quite different as fall approaches, for the pole-facing slopes remain in the shade all day. Shade causes snow to accumulate through the fall and winter seasons.

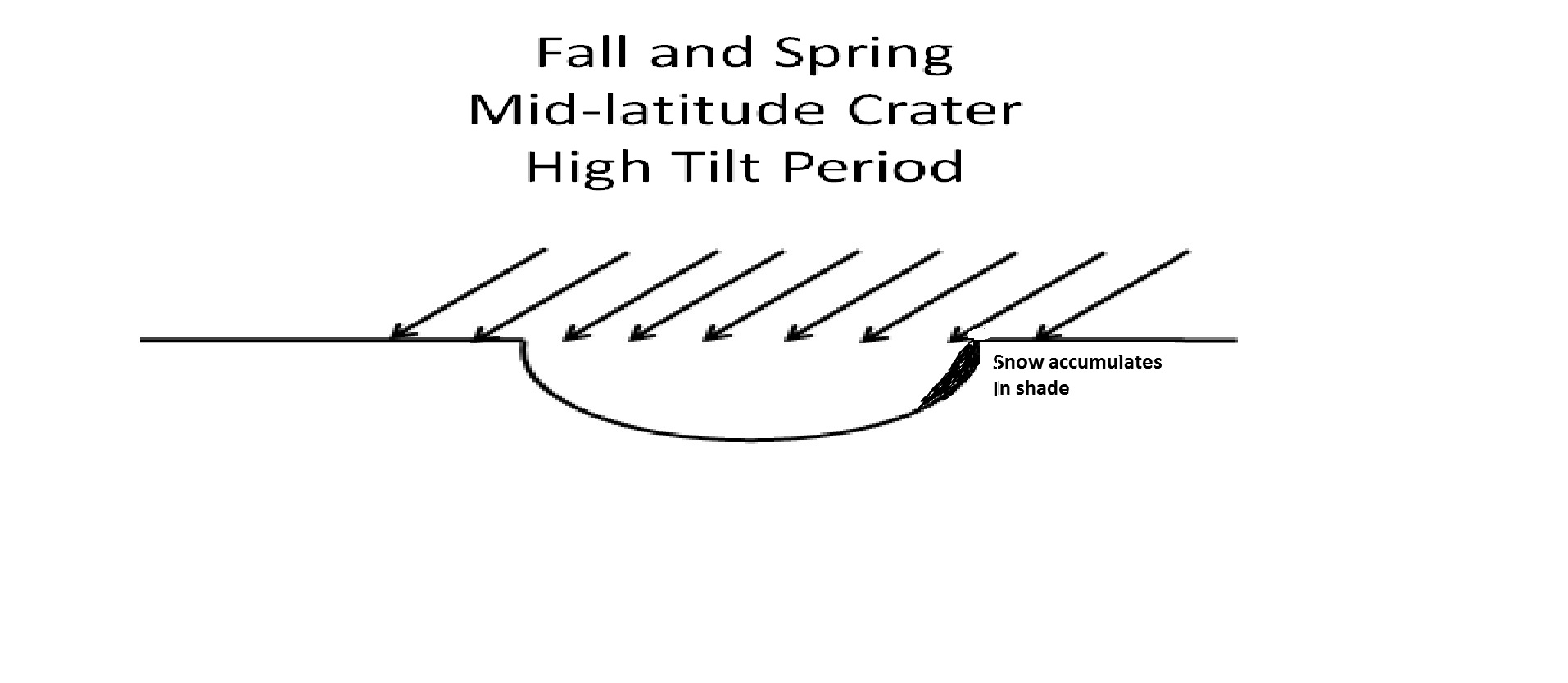
Shade on the pole-facing wall of a mid-latitude crater promotes snow accumulation. Note the snow will be grey to black due to dust.

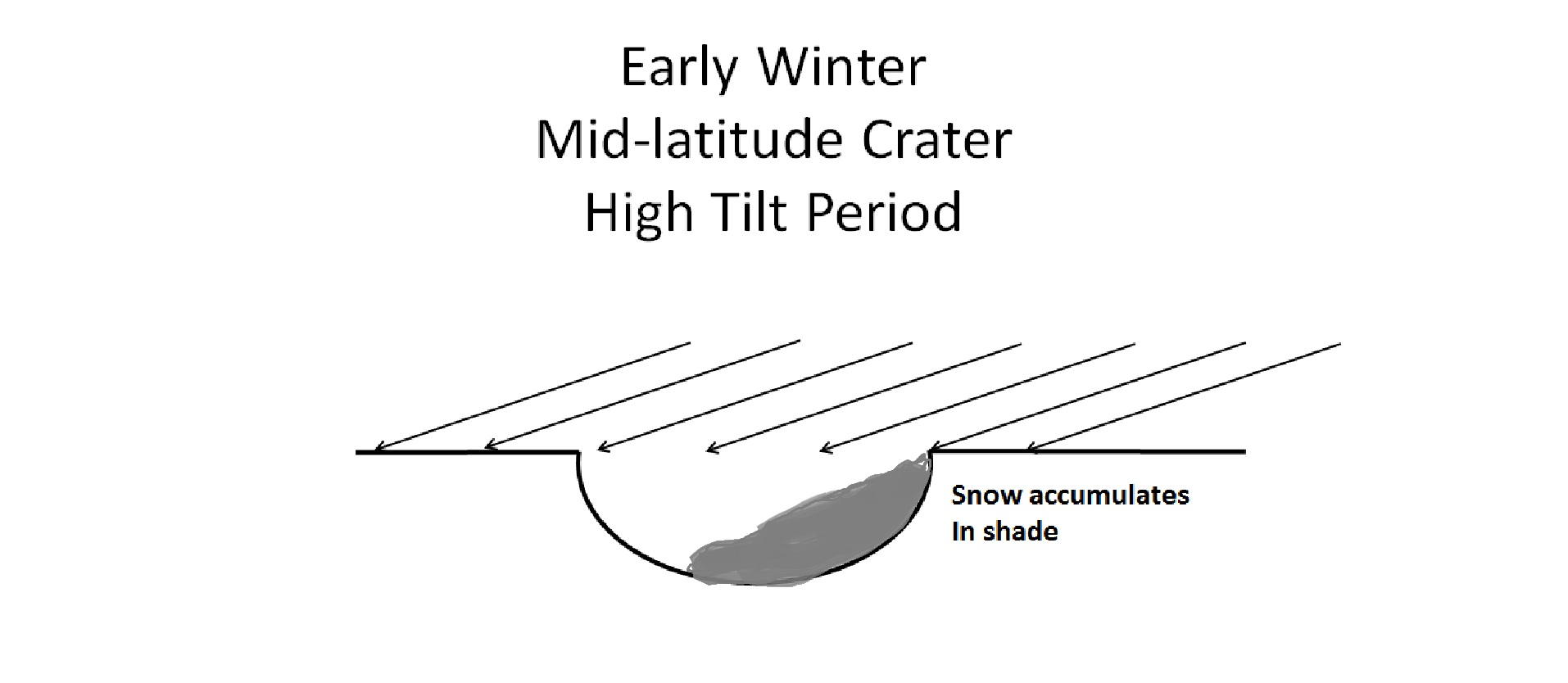
By winter a large mass of snow has accumulated in the pole-facing pole of a crater. As the seasons warm, this snow deposit will melt to produce gullies.

In the spring at certain point, the ground will be warm enough and the air pressure high enough for liquid water to form at certain times of the day. There may be sufficient water to produce gullies by erosion. Or, the water may soak into the ground, and later move down as a debris flow. Gullies on Earth formed by this process resemble Martian gullies. The great changes in the tilt of Mars explain both the strong relationship of gullies to certain latitude bands and the fact that the vast majority of gullies exist on shady, pole-facing slopes. Models support the idea that pressure/temperature changes during high obliquity times are enough to allow liquid water to be stable in places where gullies are common.

Research published in January 2015 suggests that these seasonal changes could have happened within the last two million years (between 400,000 and two million years ago) creating conditions suitable for formation of the gullies through ice melt.

Today, we have noticed small changes in gullies even though it is not possible for liquid water to exist. However, in the past perhaps water was involved. Indeed, a large team of researchers published a paper in Science that showed that water would have existed where the gullies formed when the tilt of Mars went to 35 degrees. It has done that many times; the last time just 630,000 years ago.

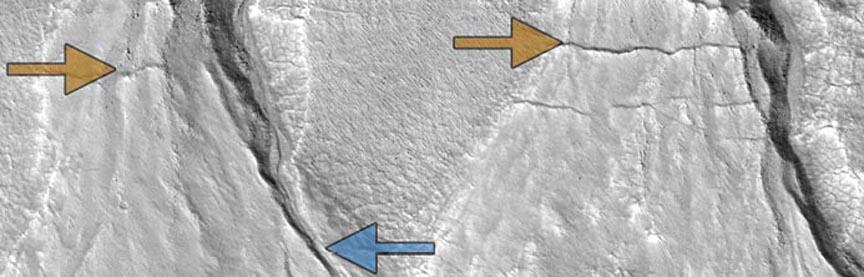
Sharp-featured recent gullies (blue arrows) and older degraded gullies (gold) in the same location on Mars. These suggest cyclical climate change within the last two million years

== Associated features of gullies ==
Some steep slopes show other features in addition to gullies. At the base of some gullies there may be curved ridges or depressions. These have been named "spatulate depressions." Along walls, like crater walls, ice often accumulates during certain phases of the Martian climate cycle. When the climate changes, this ice can sublimate into the thin Martian atmosphere. Sublimation is when a substance goes directly from a solid state to a gas state. Dry ice on Earth does this. So when the ice at the base of a steep wall sublimates, a spatulate depression results. Also, more ice from higher up the wall will tend to flow downward. This flow will stretch the surface rocky debris thereby forming transverse crevasses. Such formations have been termed "washboard terrain" because they resemble the old fashioned washboards. The parts of gullies and some associated features of gullies are shown below in a HiRISE images.

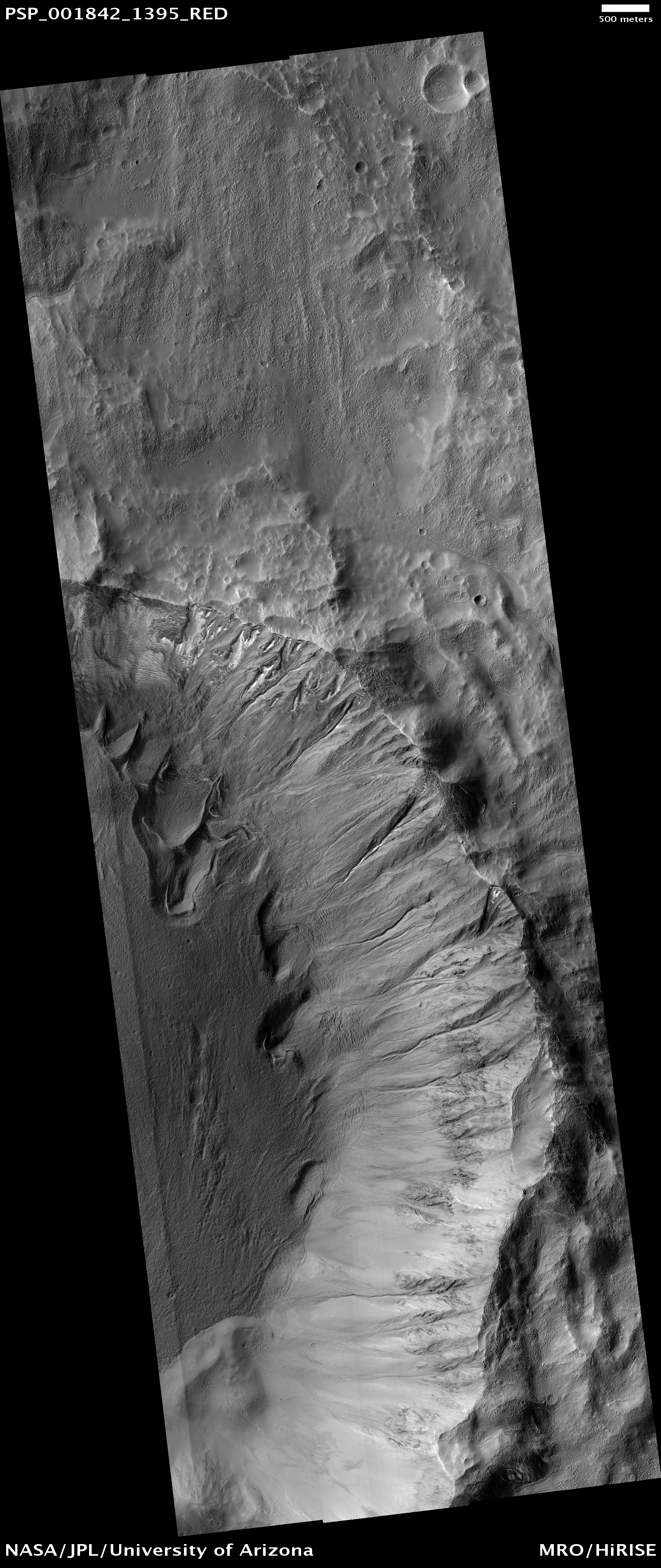
Wide view of crater showing gullies and other features, as seen by HiRISE

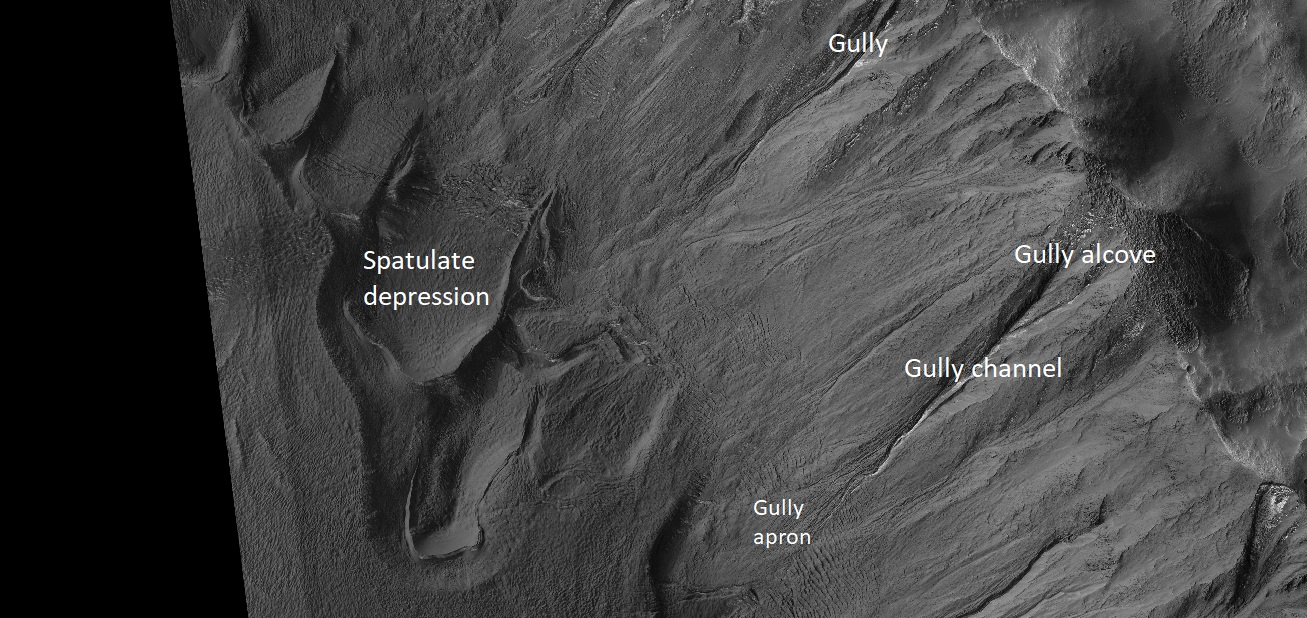
Close view of crater labeled with "spatulate depression" and other features, as seen by HiRISE Note: this is an enlargement of the previous image.

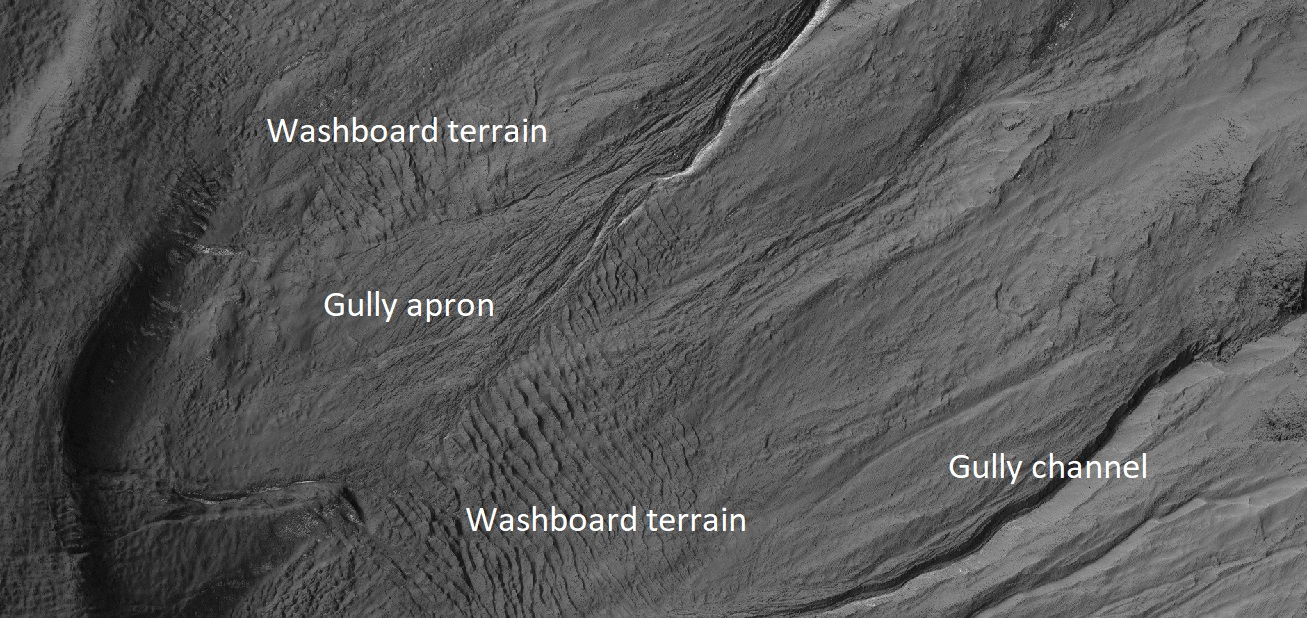
Close view of crater labeled with "washboard terrain" and other features, as seen by HiRISE Note: this is an enlargement of a previous image. The washboard terrain was formed before the gully apron since the gully apron cuts across the washboard terrain.

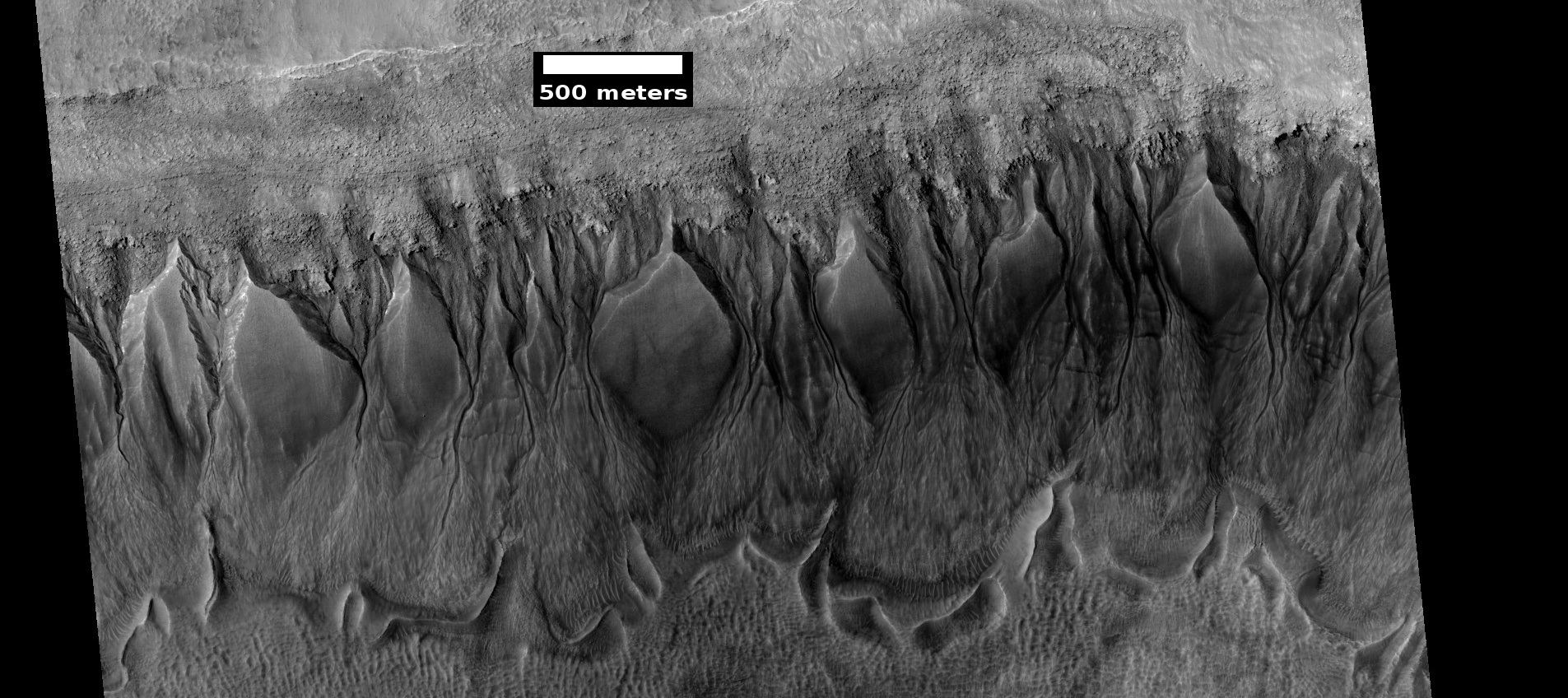
Gullies in crater in Phaethontis quadrangle, as seen by HiRISE under HiWish program Spatulate depressions are visible.

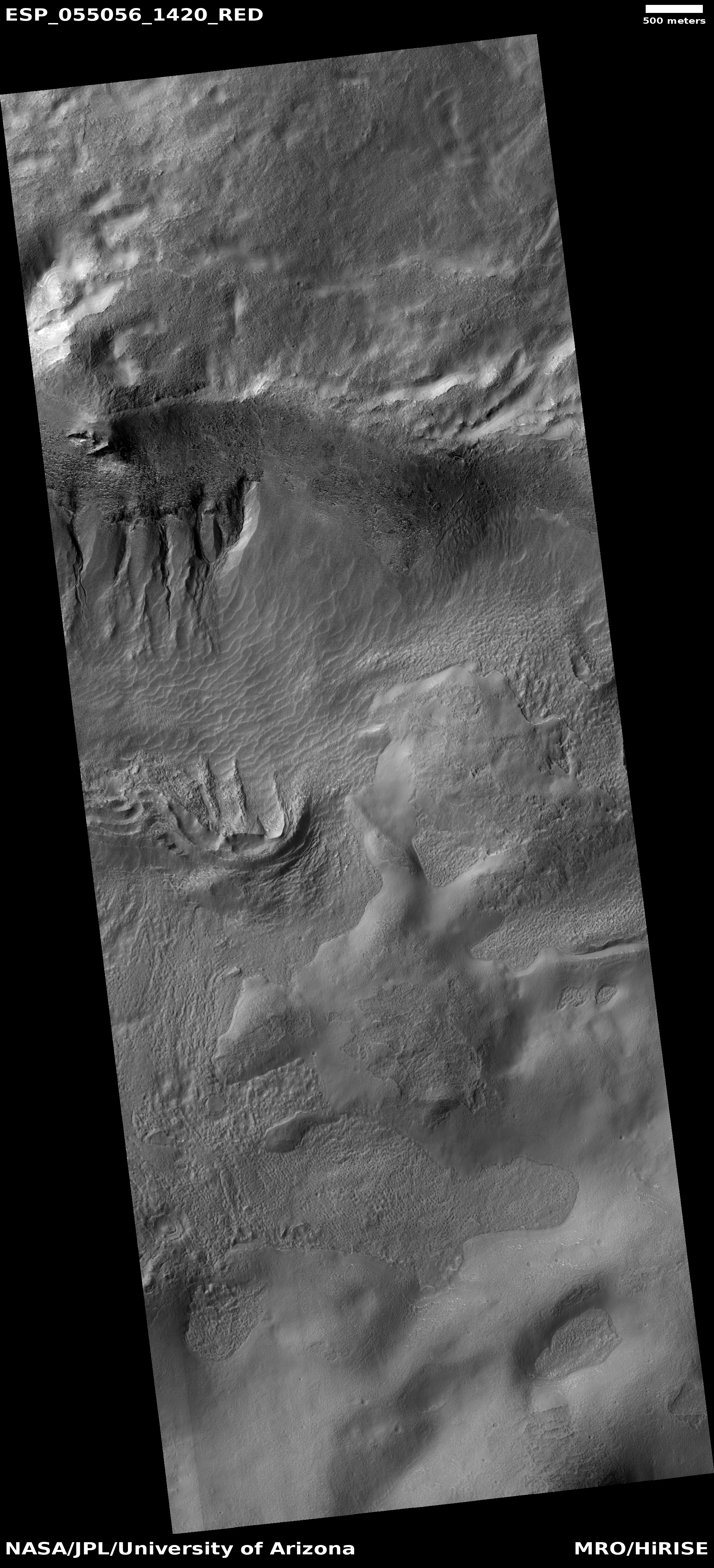
Gullies in Noachis quadrangle, as seen by HiRISE under HiWish program Spatulate depressions are visible.

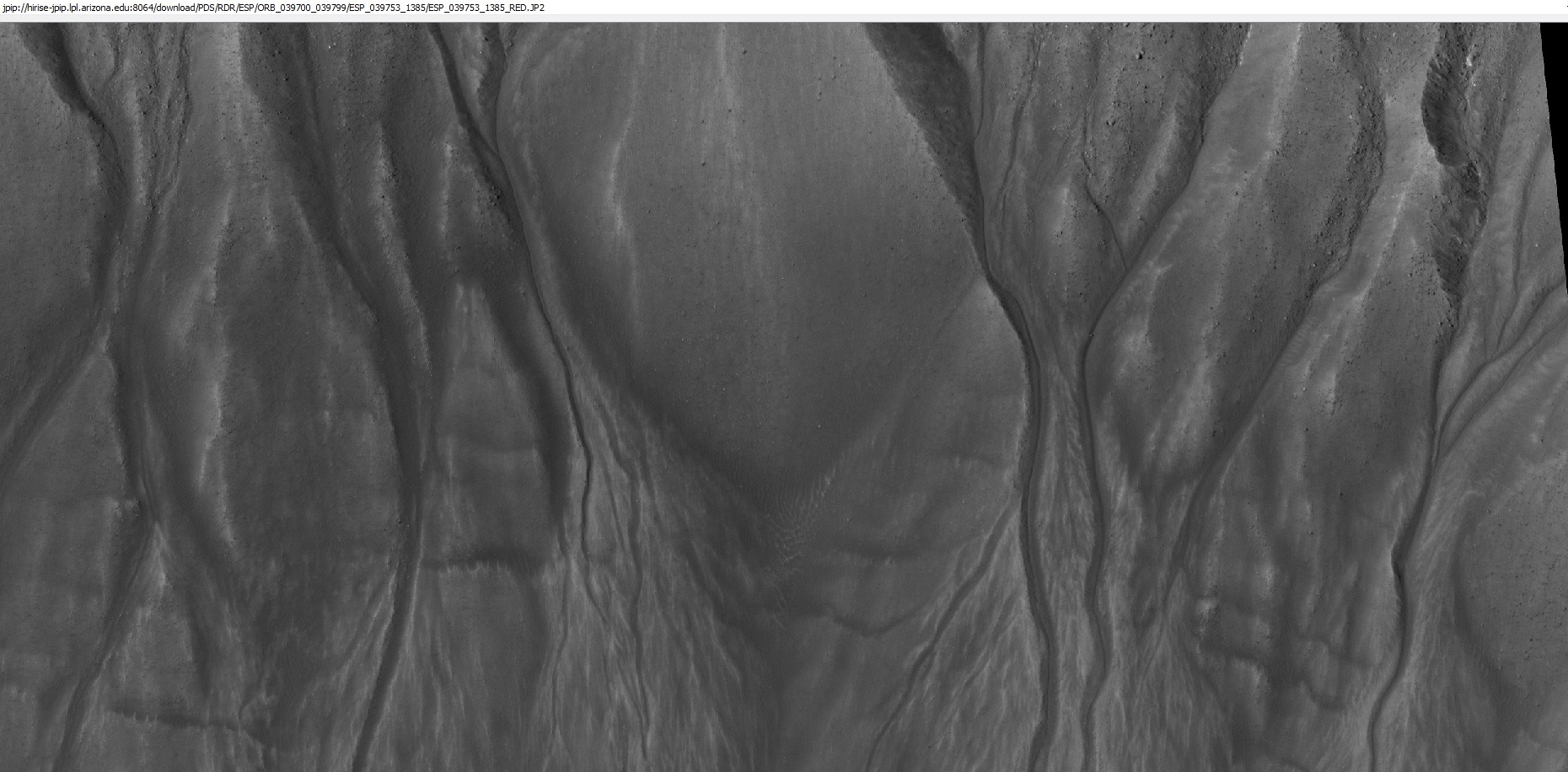
Close-up of channels in gullies showing that the paths of the channels changed over time. This feature suggest formation by running water with a high load of sediment. Picture was taken with HiRISE under HiWish program. Location is the Mare Acidalium quadrangle. Note this is an enlargement of a previous image in Phaethontis quadrangle.

== Images from around Mars ==
Phaethontis quadrangle gullies

The Phaethontis quadrangle is the location of many gullies that may be due to recent flowing water. Some are found in the Gorgonum Chaos and in many craters near the large craters Copernicus and Newton (Martian crater).

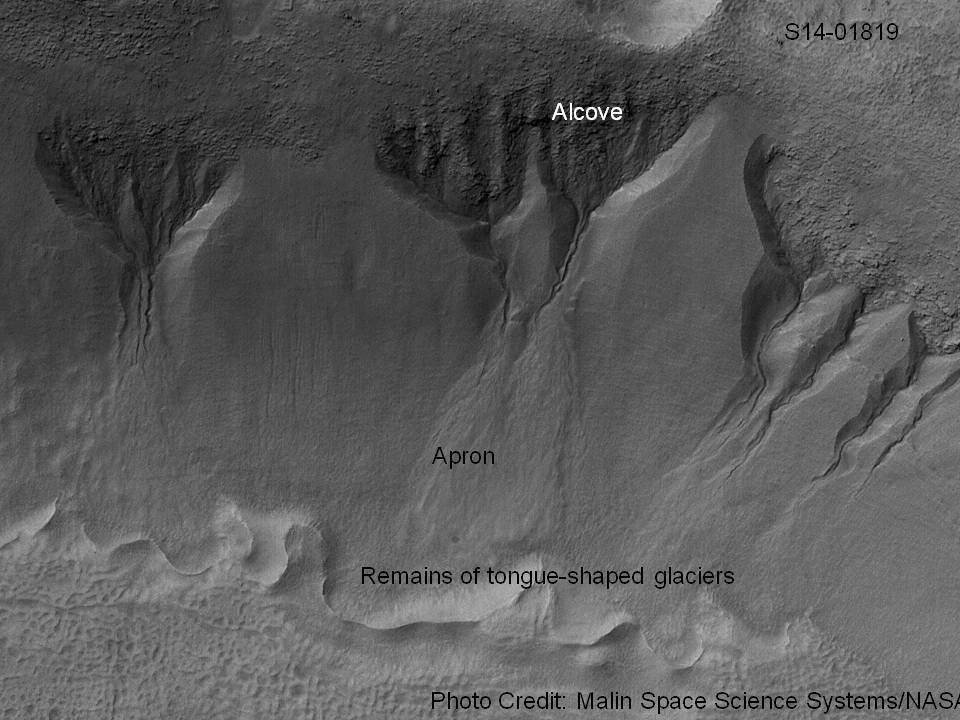
Group of gullies on north wall of crater that lies west of the crater Newton (41.3047 degrees south latitude, 192.89 east longitide). Image taken with Mars Global Surveyor under the MOC Public Targeting Program.

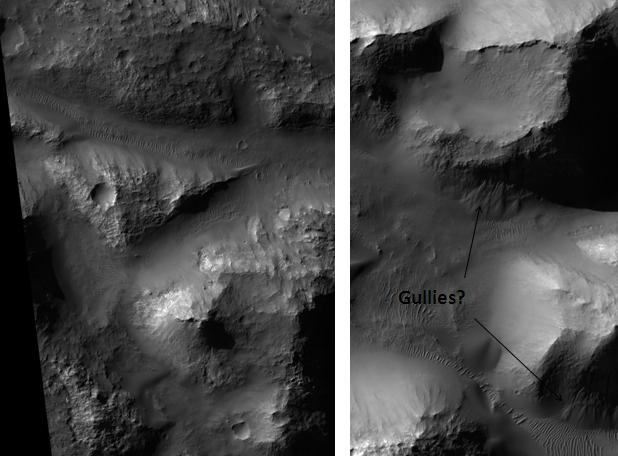
Atlantis Chaos, as seen by HiRISE. Click on image to see mantle covering and possible gullies. The two images are different parts of the original image. They have different scales.

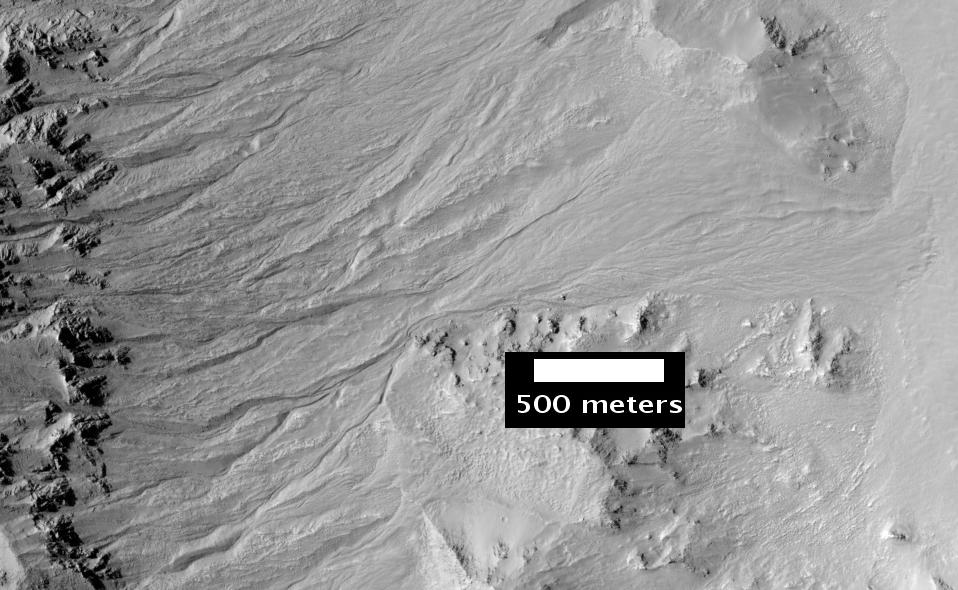
Gullies. Notice how channels curve around obstacles, as seen by HiRISE.

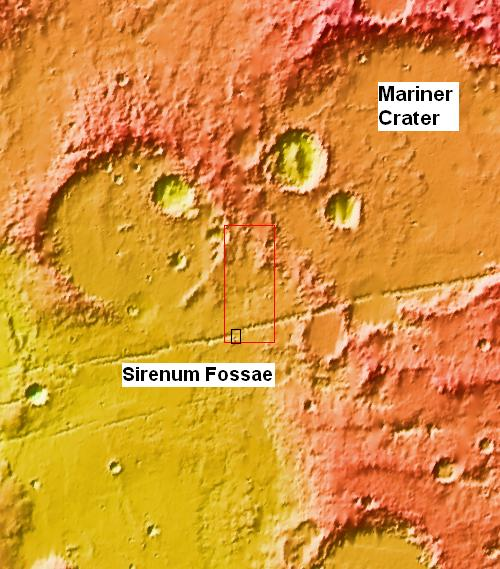
MOLA context image for the series of three images to follow of gullies in a trough and nearby crater.

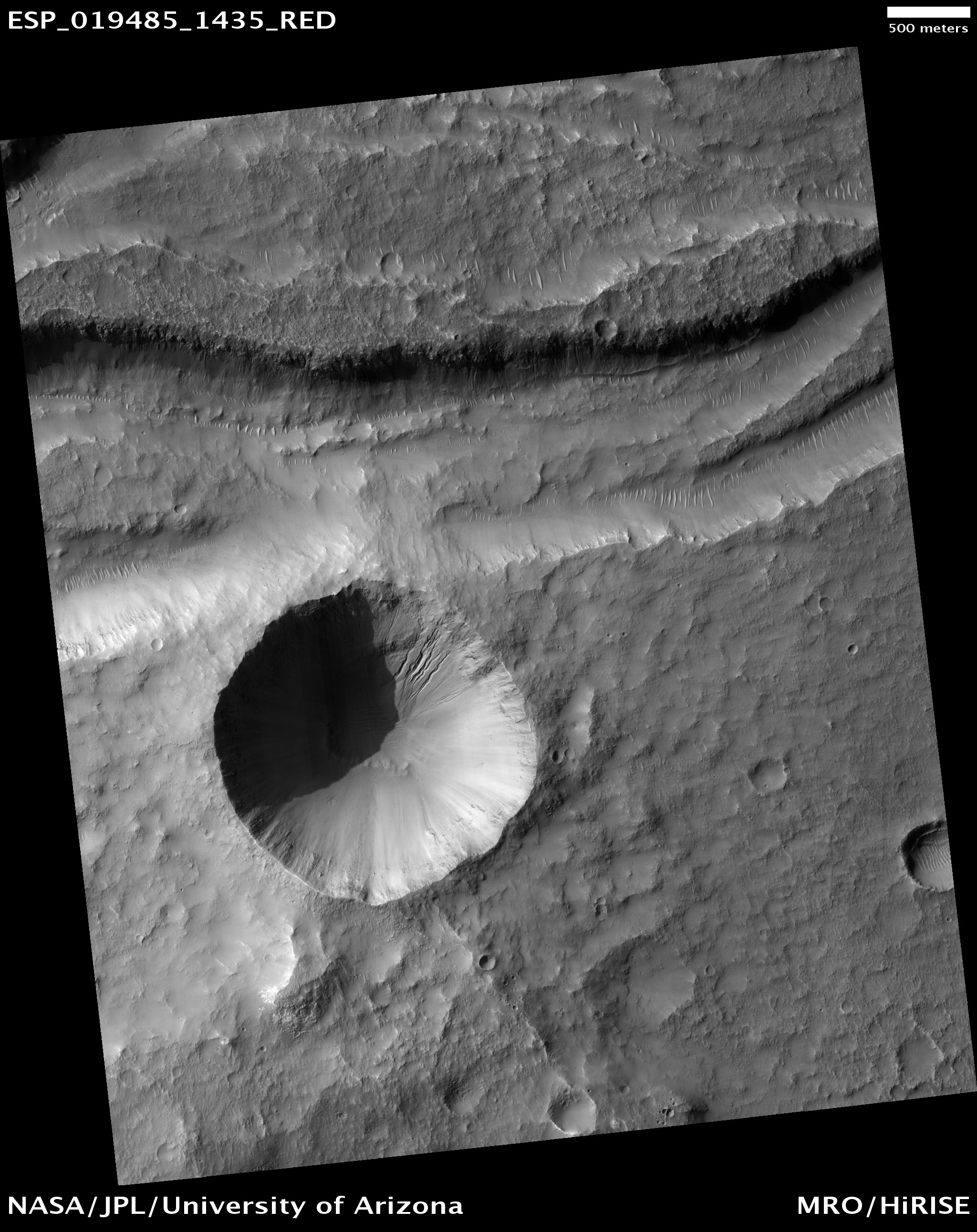
Gullies in a trough and nearby crater, as seen by HiRISE under the HiWish program. Scale bar is 500 meters long.

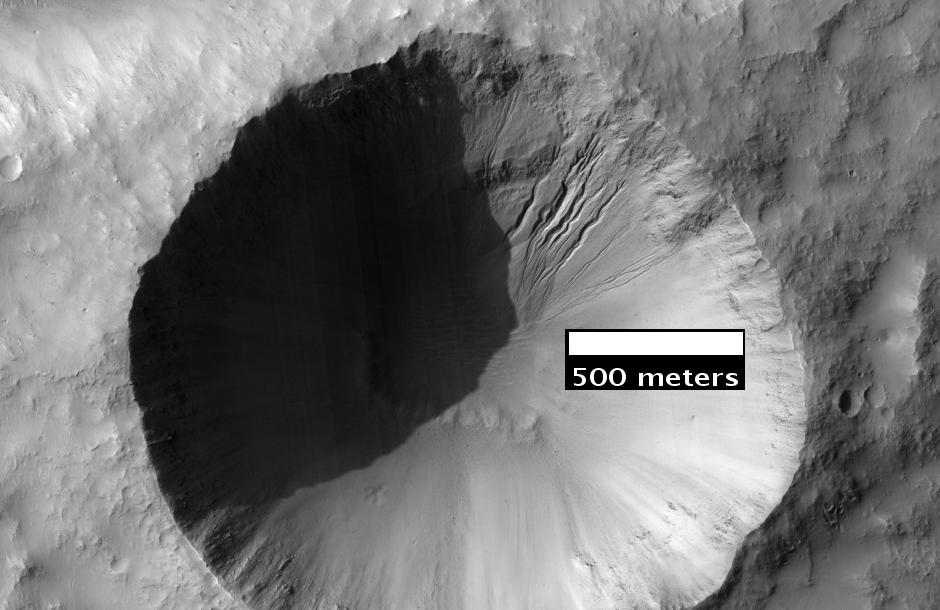
Close-up of gullies in crater, as seen by HiRISE under the HiWish program.

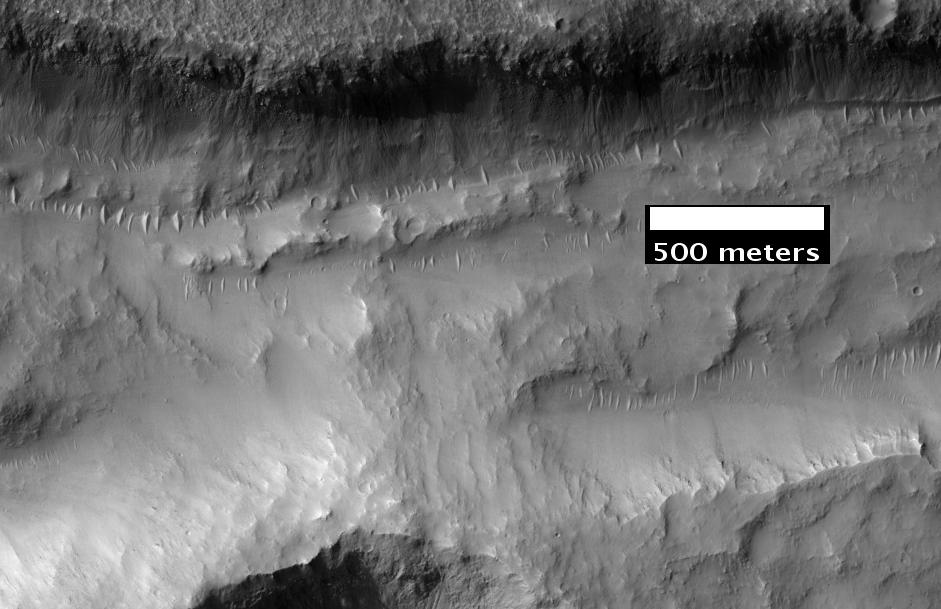
Close-up of gullies in trough, as seen by HiRISE under the HiWish program. These are some of the smaller gullies visible on Mars.

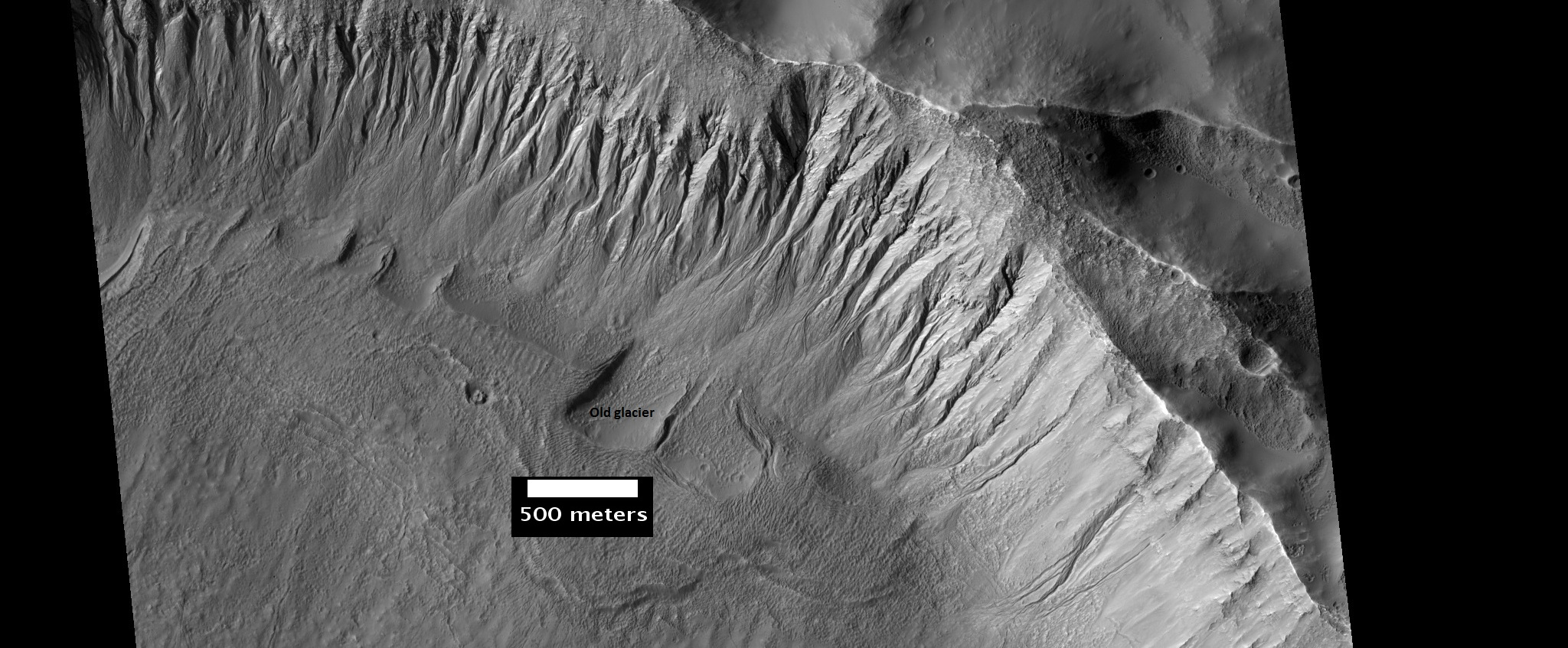
Gullies near Newton Crater, as seen by HiRISE, under the HiWish program. Place where there was an old glacier is labeled.

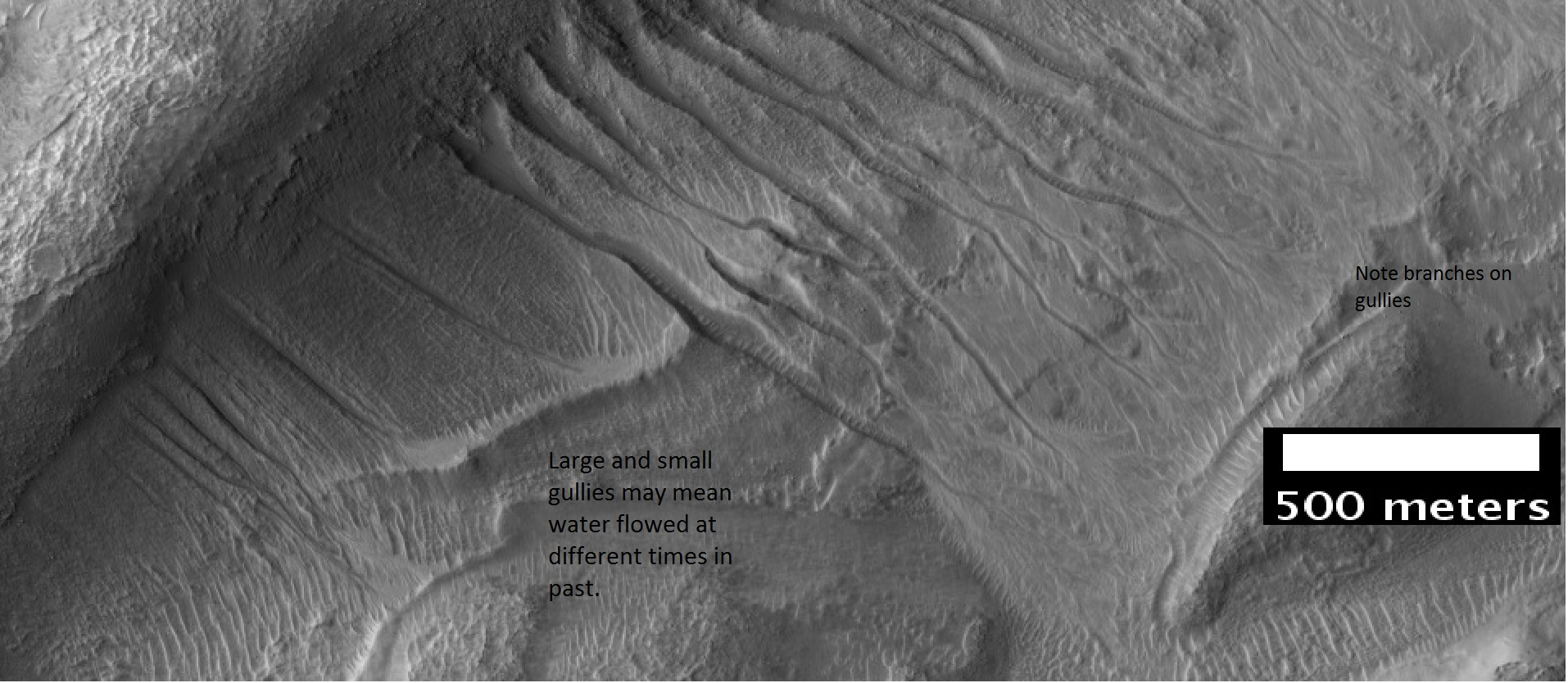
HiRISE image, taken under HiWish program, of gullies in a crater in Terra Sirenum.

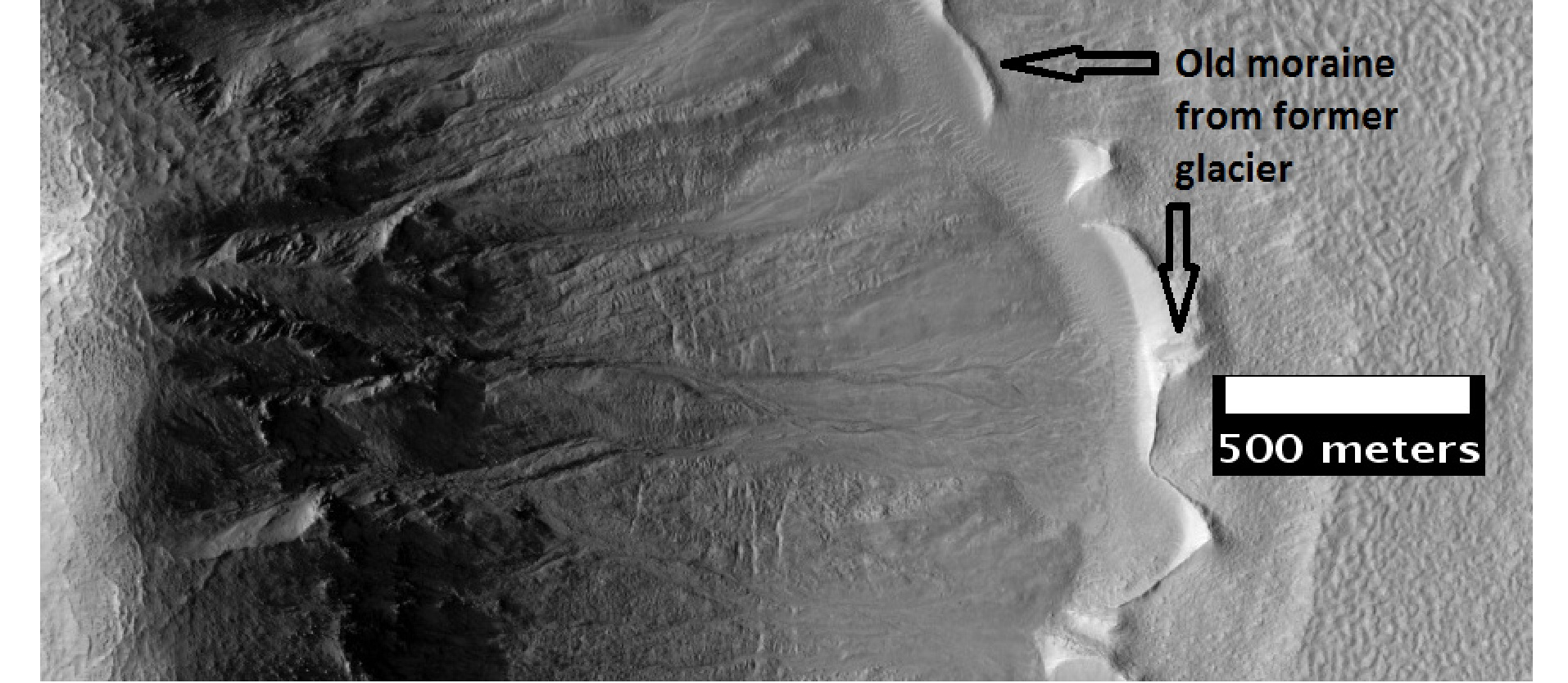
Gullies with remains of a former glacier in crater in Terra Sirenum, as seen by HiRISE under HiWish program.

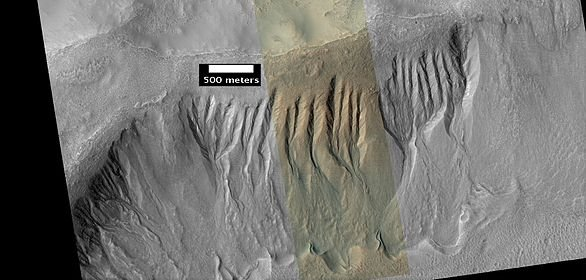
Gullies near Newton Crater, as seen by HiRISE under the HiWish Program.

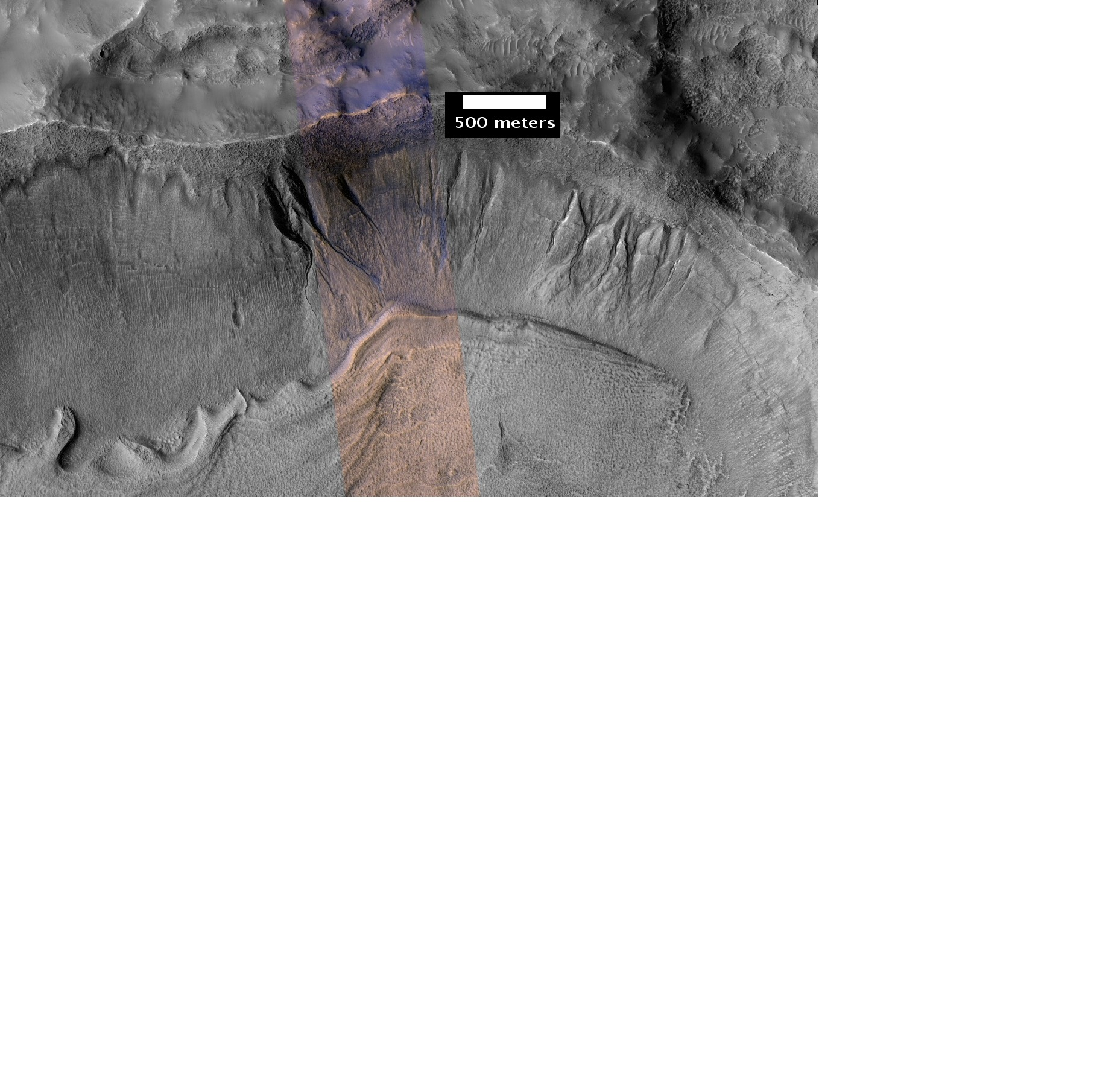
Gullies in a crater in Terra Sirenum, as seen by HiRISE under the HiWish Program.

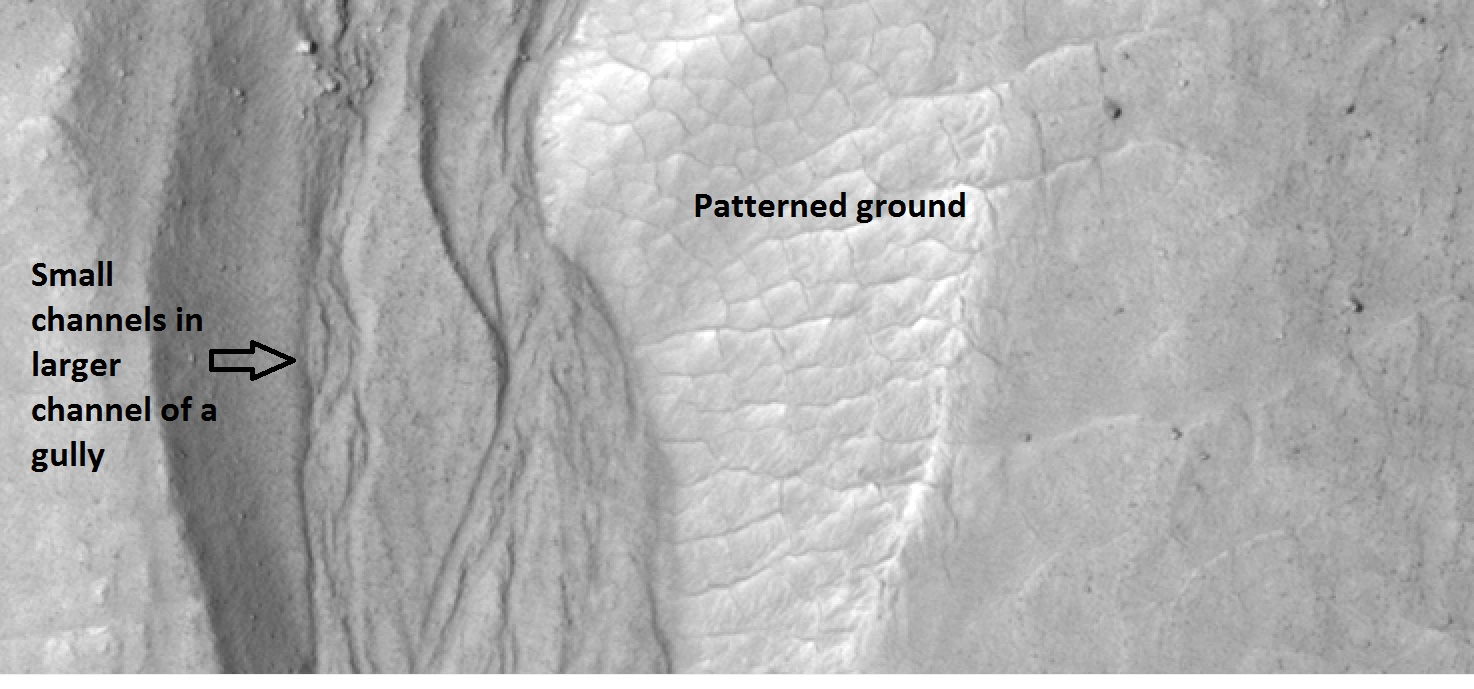
Close-up of gully showing multiple channels and patterned ground, as seen by HiRISE under the HiWish program.

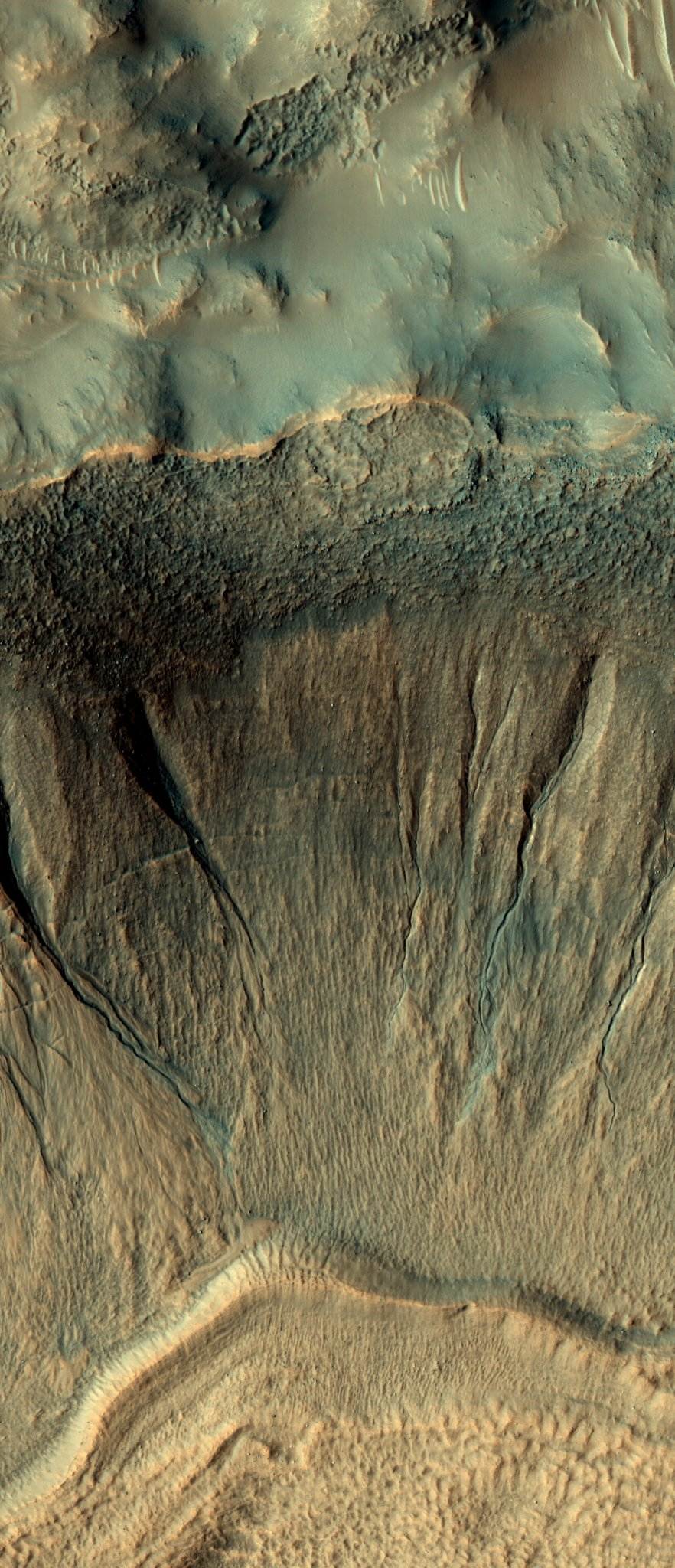
Gullies on crater wall, as seen by HiRISE under HiWish program

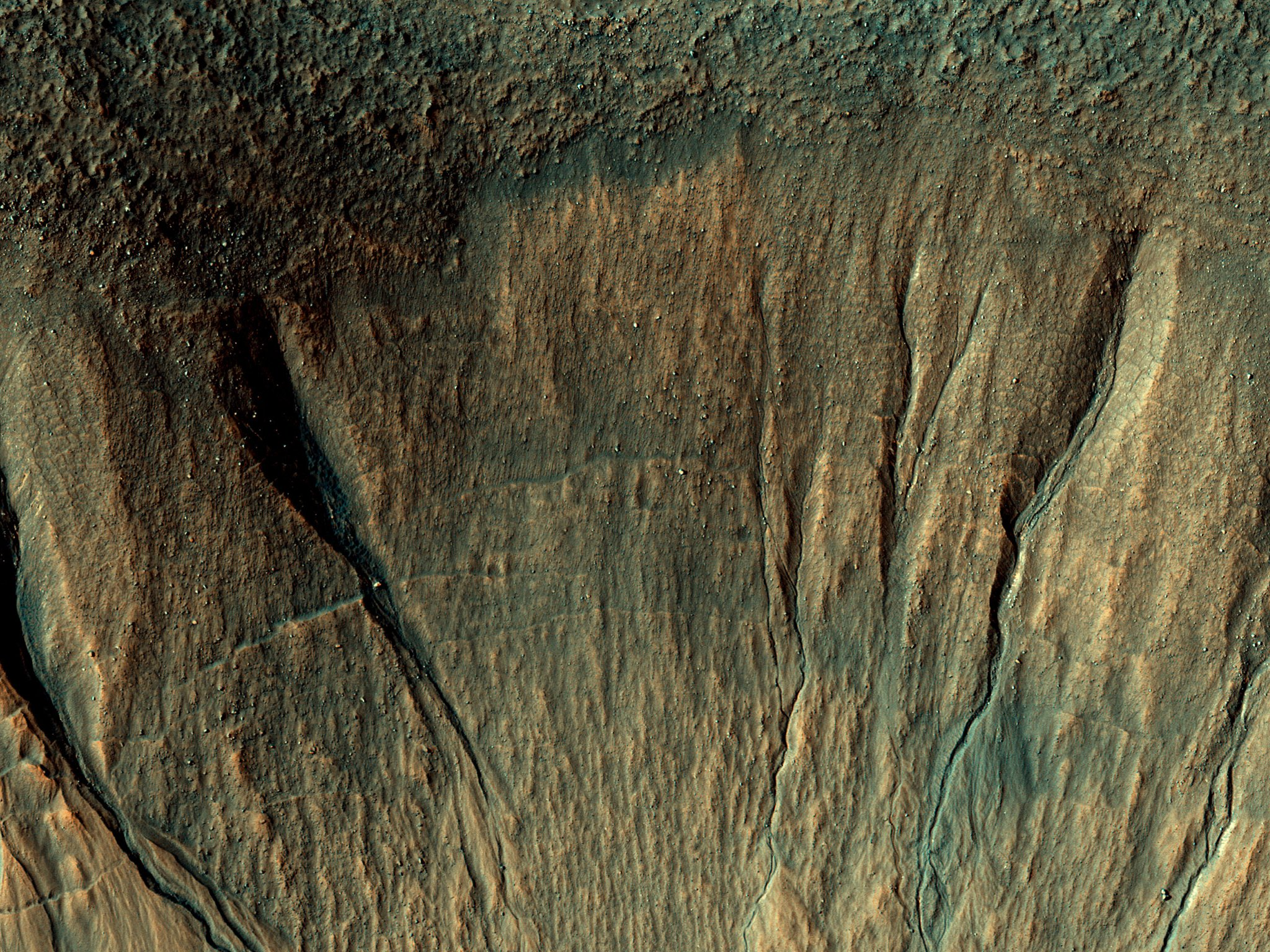
Close view of Gullies on crater wall

Eridania quadrangle gullies

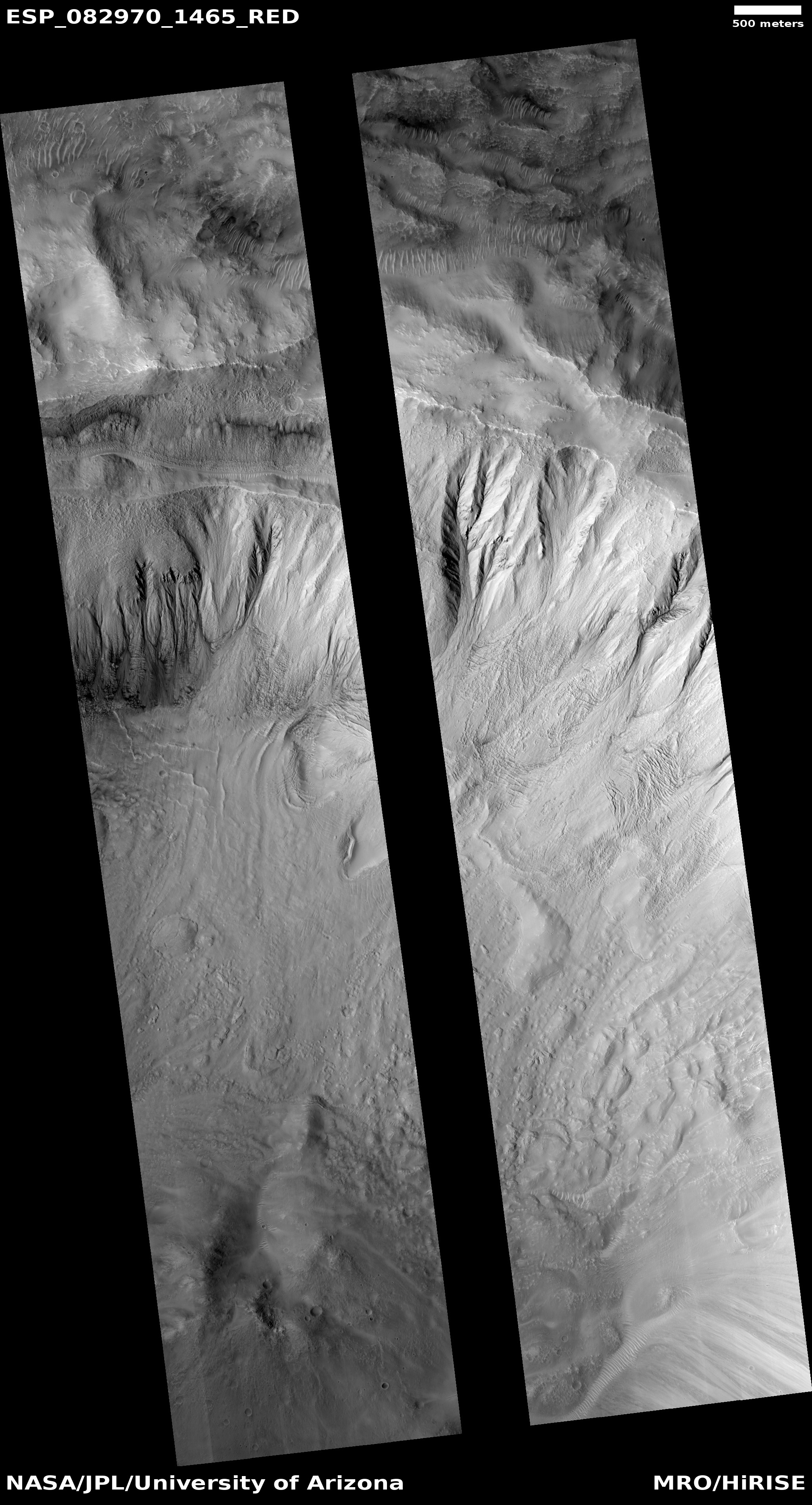
Wide view of gullies in a crater, as seen by HiRISE under HiWish program The black strip is where data were not gathered. This image was named HiRISE Picture of the Day for June 25, 2024.

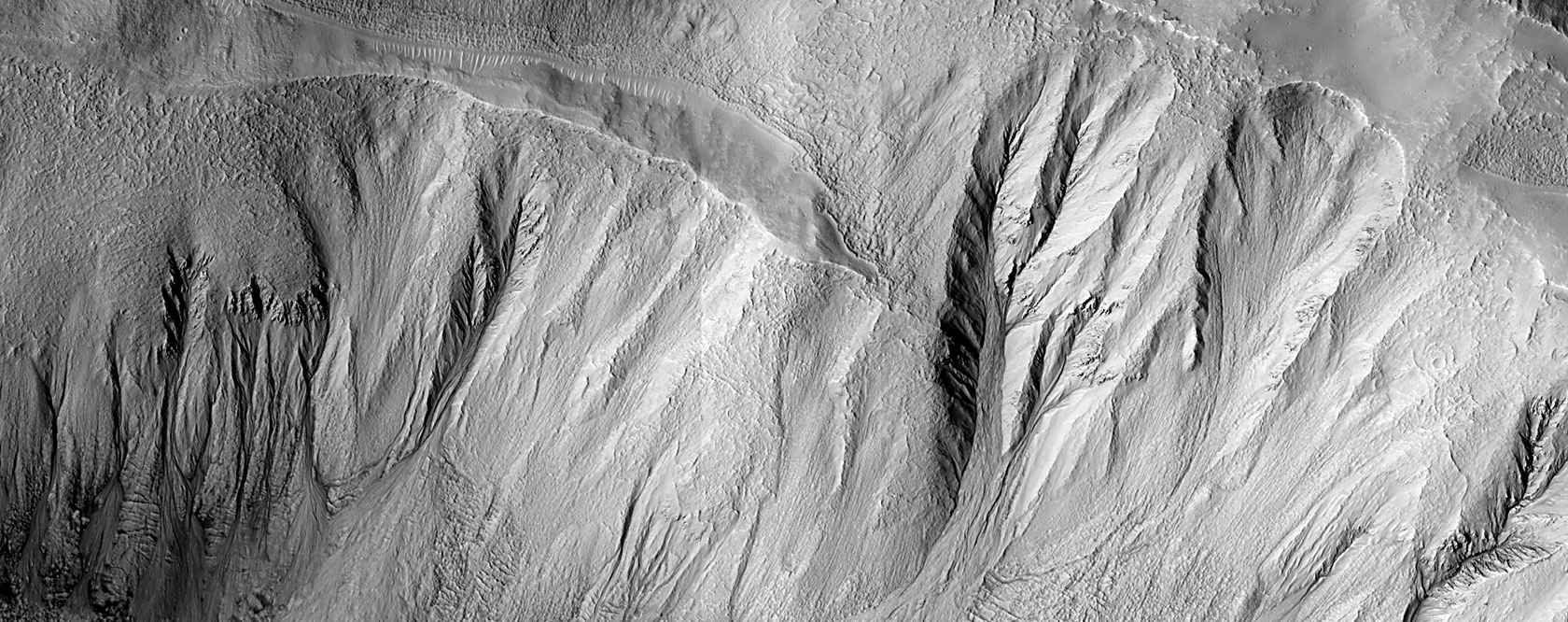
Gullies in a crater, as seen by HiRISE under HiWish program This image was named HiRISE Picture of the Day for June 25, 2024.

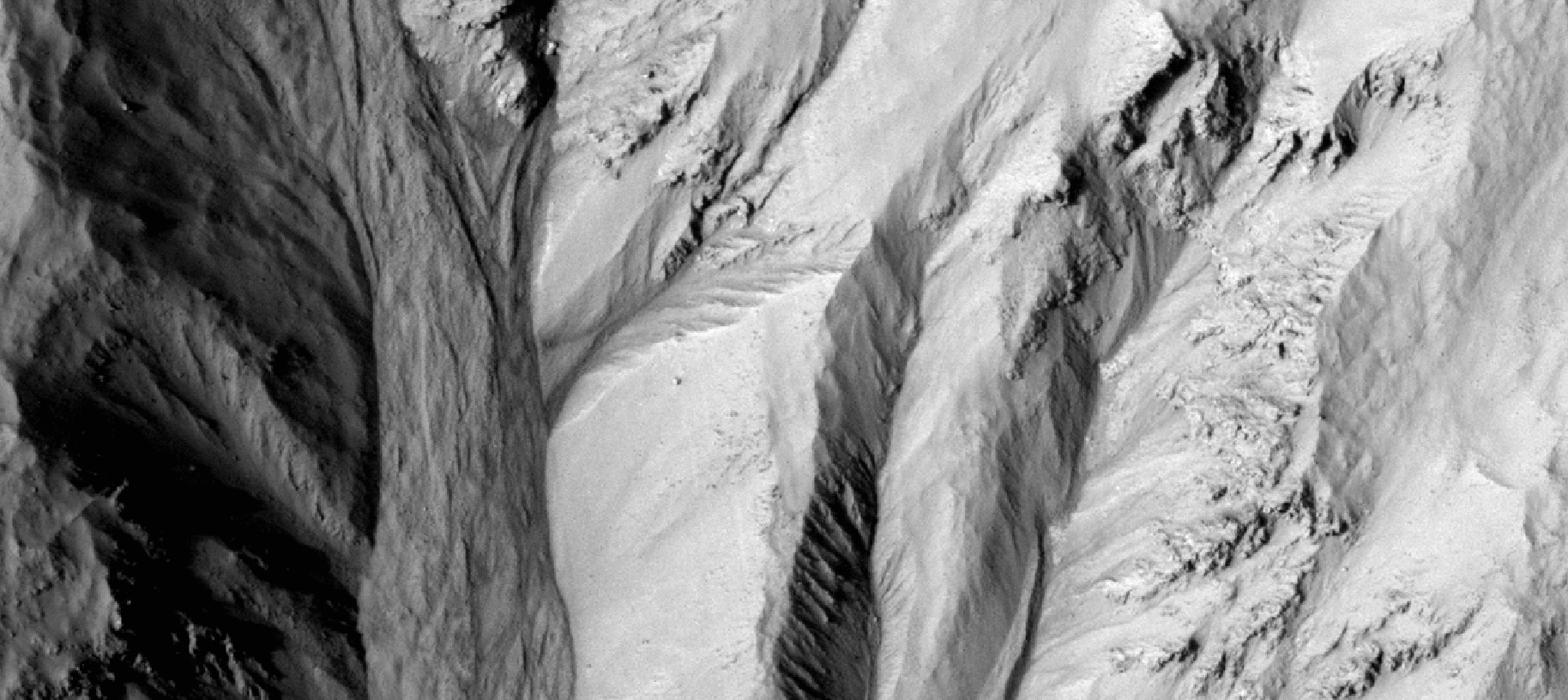
Gully alcoves as seen by HiRISE under HiWish program This image was named HiRISE Picture of the Day for June 25, 2024.

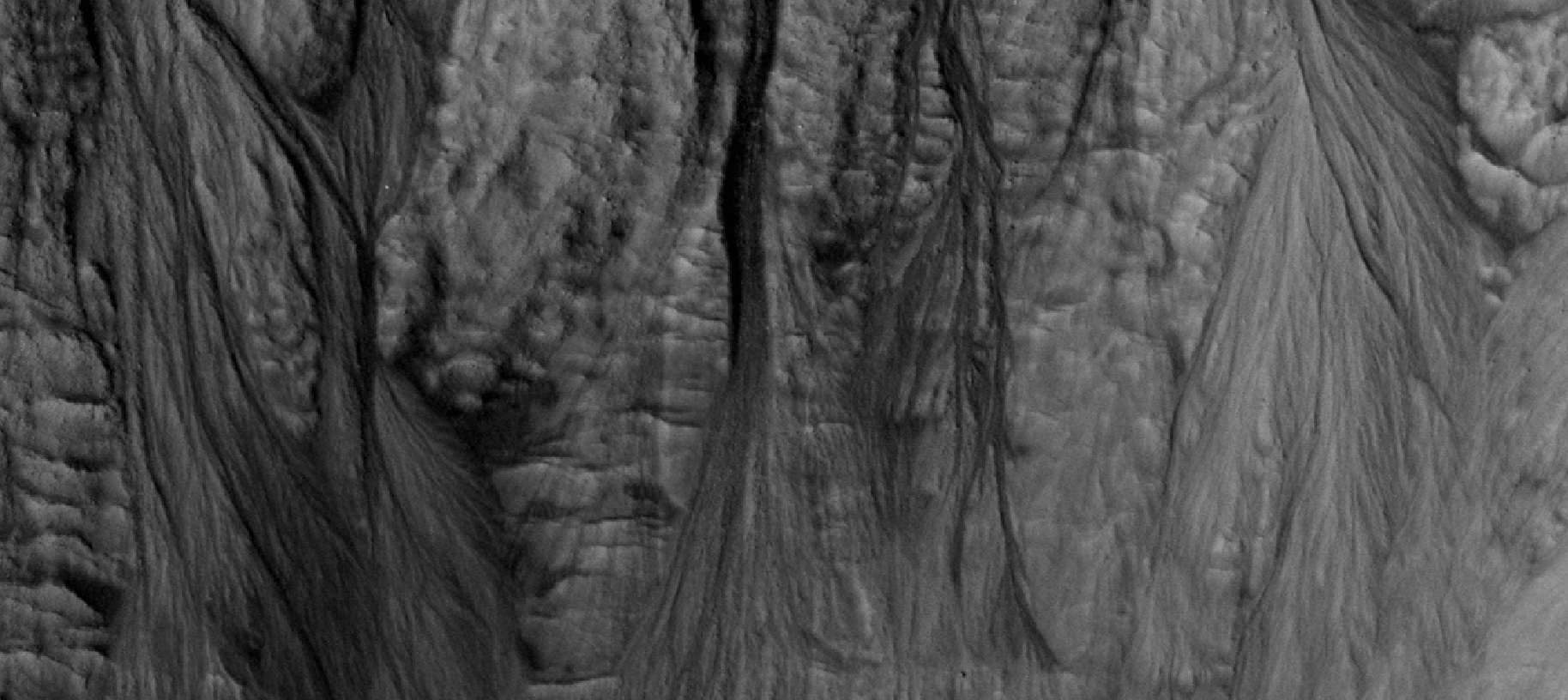
Gully aprons as seen by HiRISE under HiWish program This image was named HiRISE Picture of the Day for June 25, 2024.

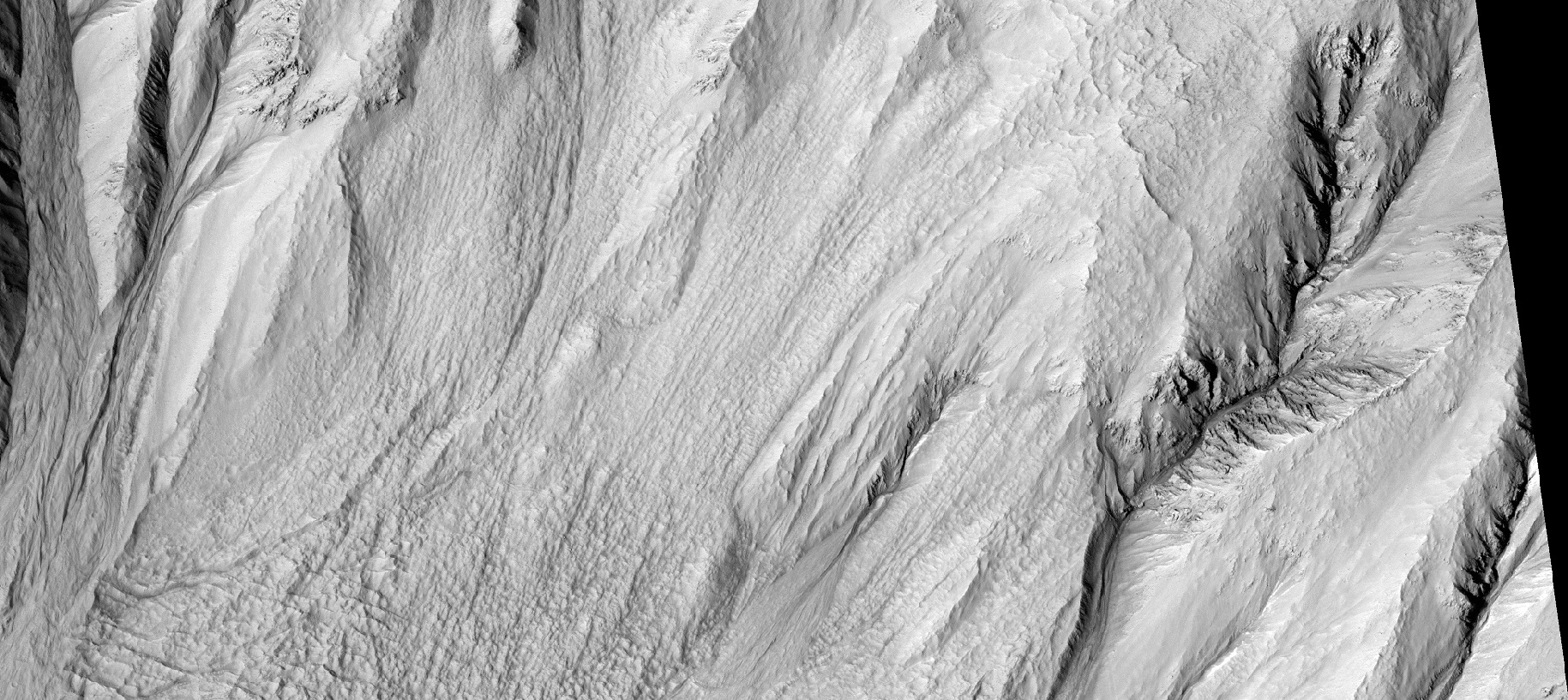
Gully alcoves as seen by HiRISE under HiWish program This image was named HiRISE Picture of the Day for June 25, 2024.

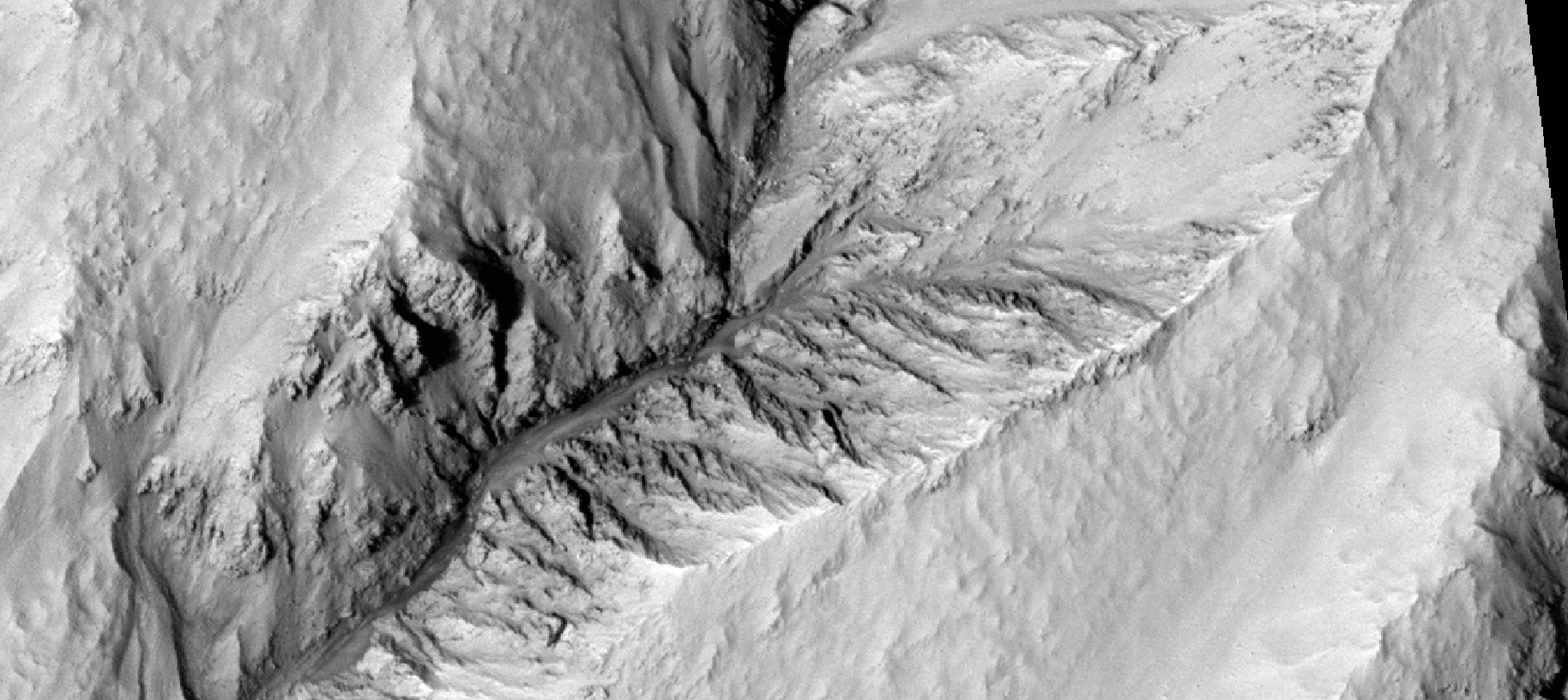
Gully alcove as seen by HiRISE under HiWish program This image was named HiRISE Picture of the Day for June 25, 2024.

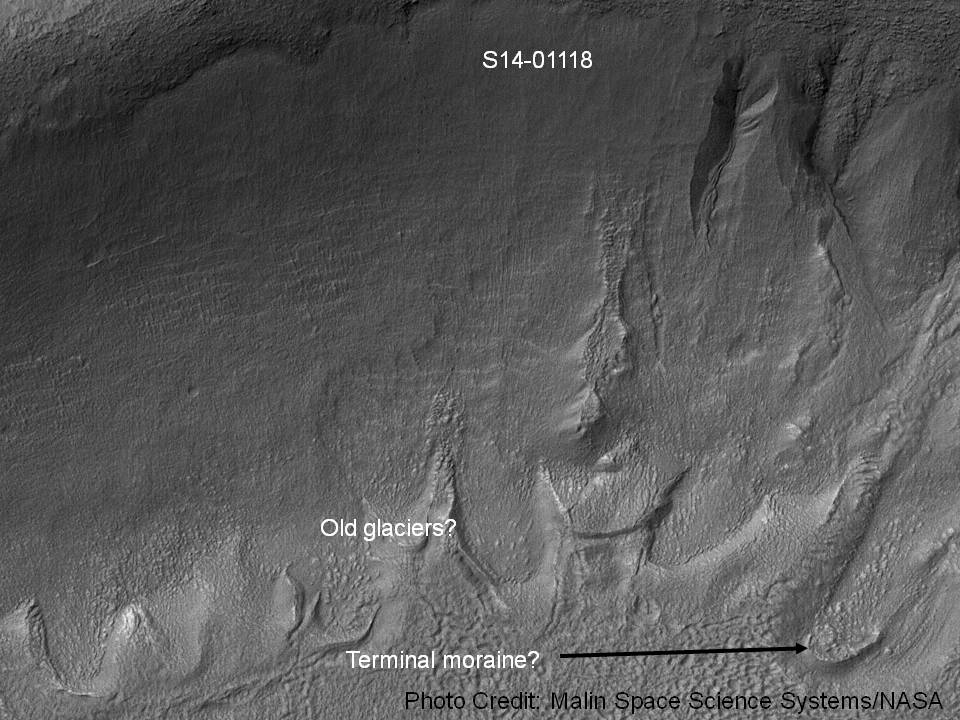
Gullies in a crater in Eridania, north of the large crater Kepler. Also, features that may be remains of old glaciers are present. One, to the right, has the shape of a tongue. Image taken with Mars Global Surveyor under the MOC Public Targeting Program.

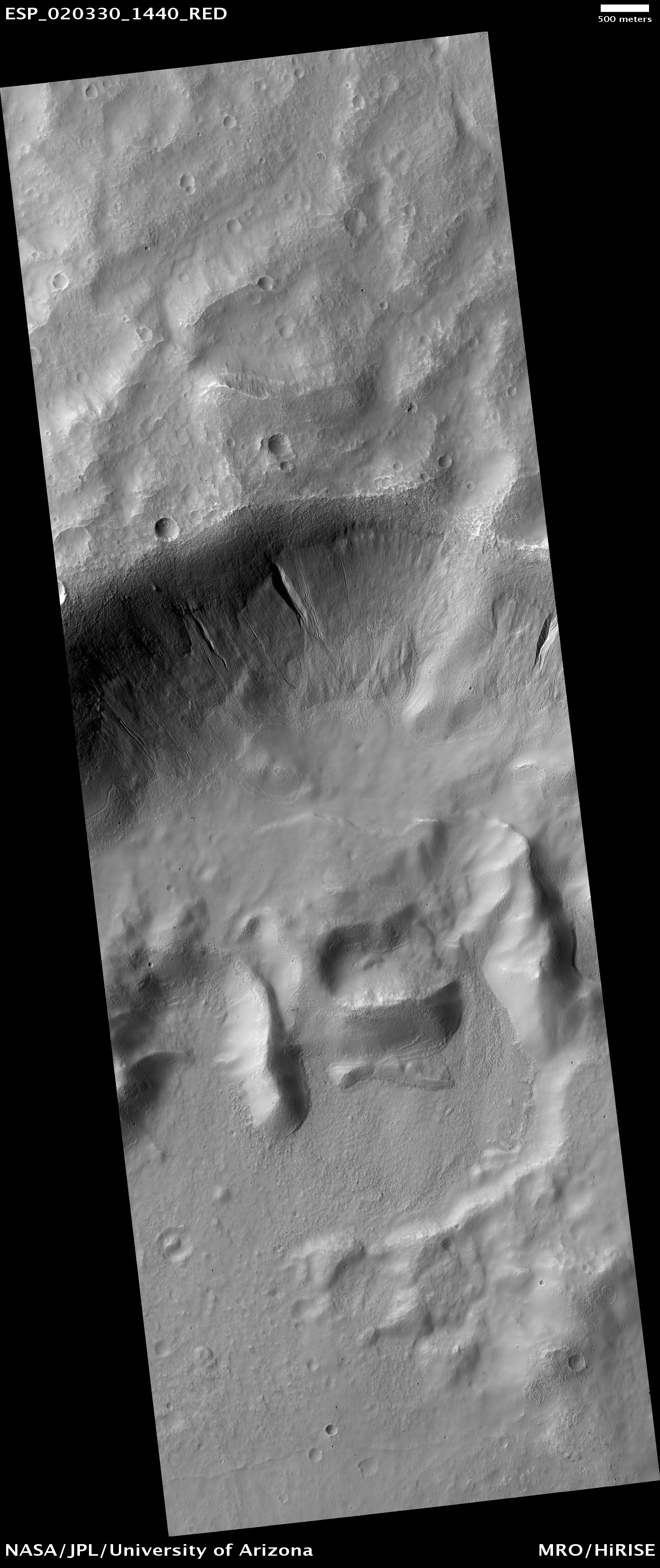
HiRISE image showing gullies. The scale bar is 500 meters. Picture taken under the HiWish program.

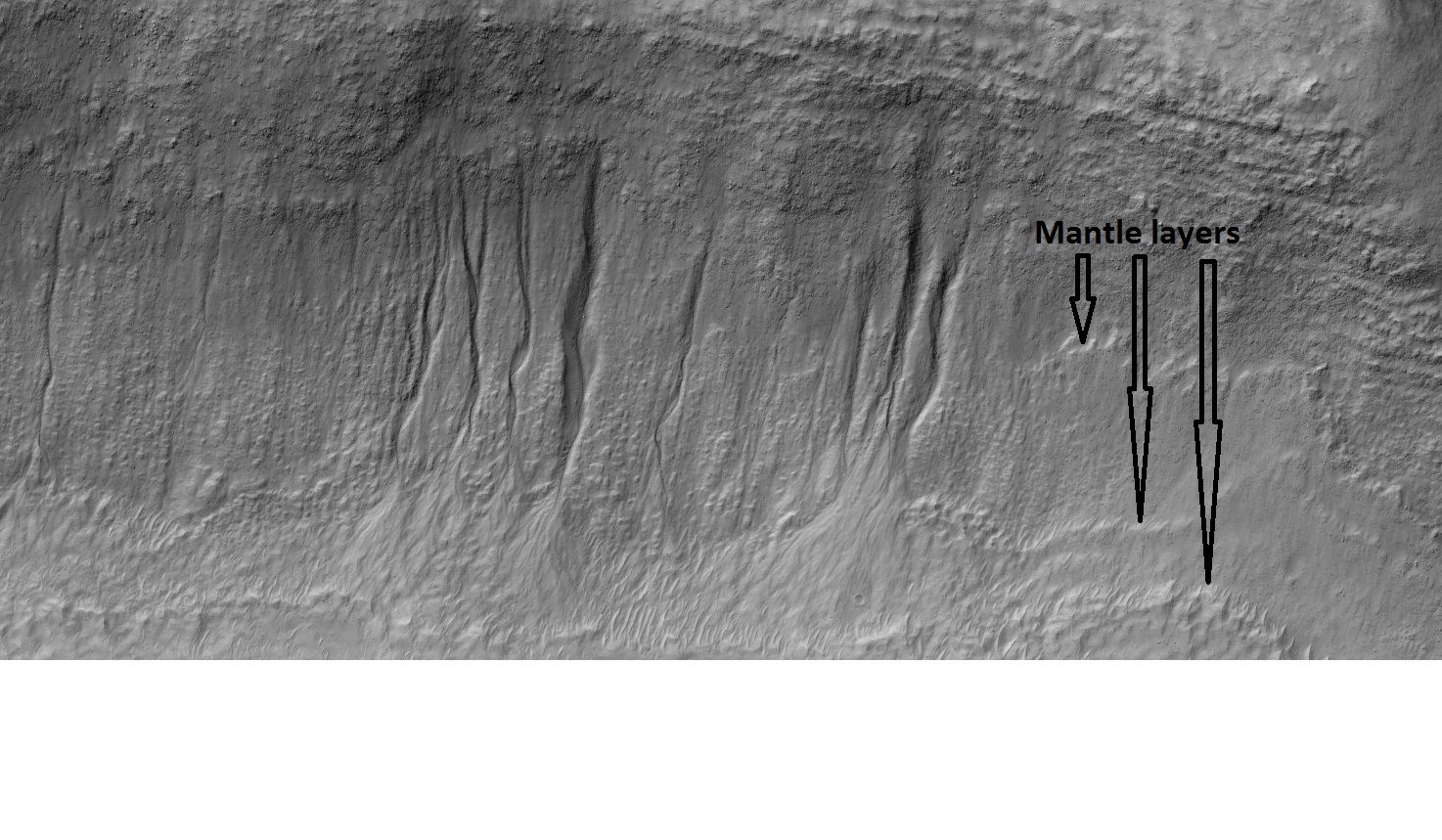
Gullies and layers in mantle on a wall, as seen by HiRISE under HiWish program. Location is Eridania quadrangle.

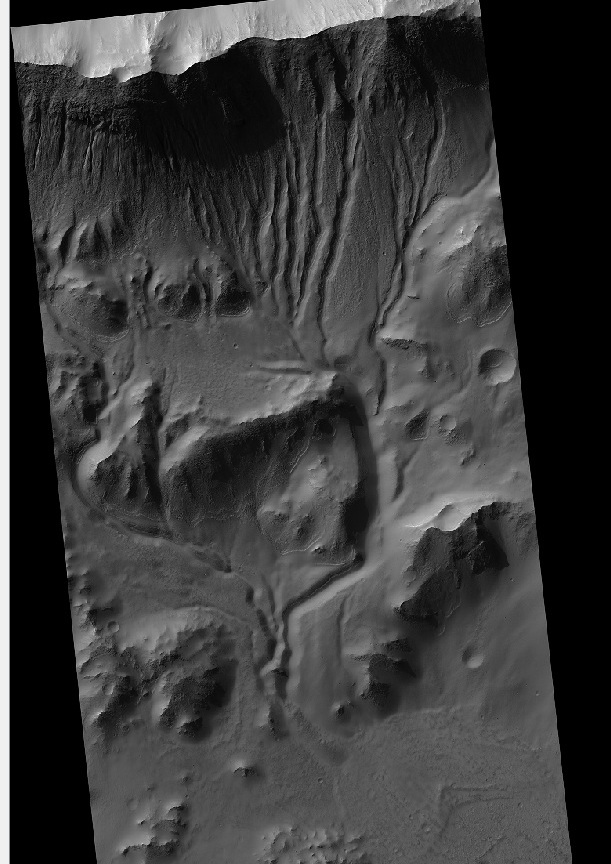
Gullies, as seen by HiRISE under HiWish program.

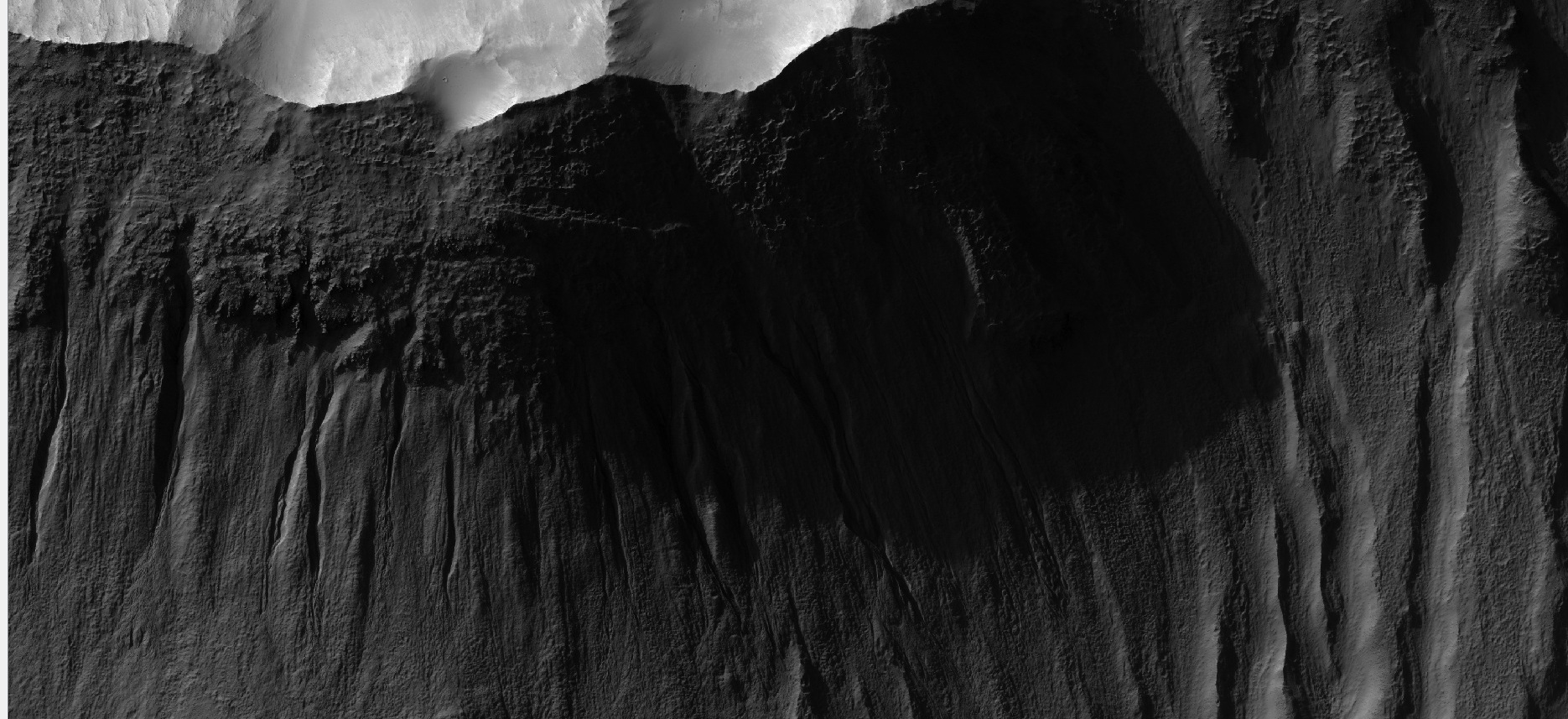
Close-up of some gullies from previous image, as seen by HiRISE under HiWish program.

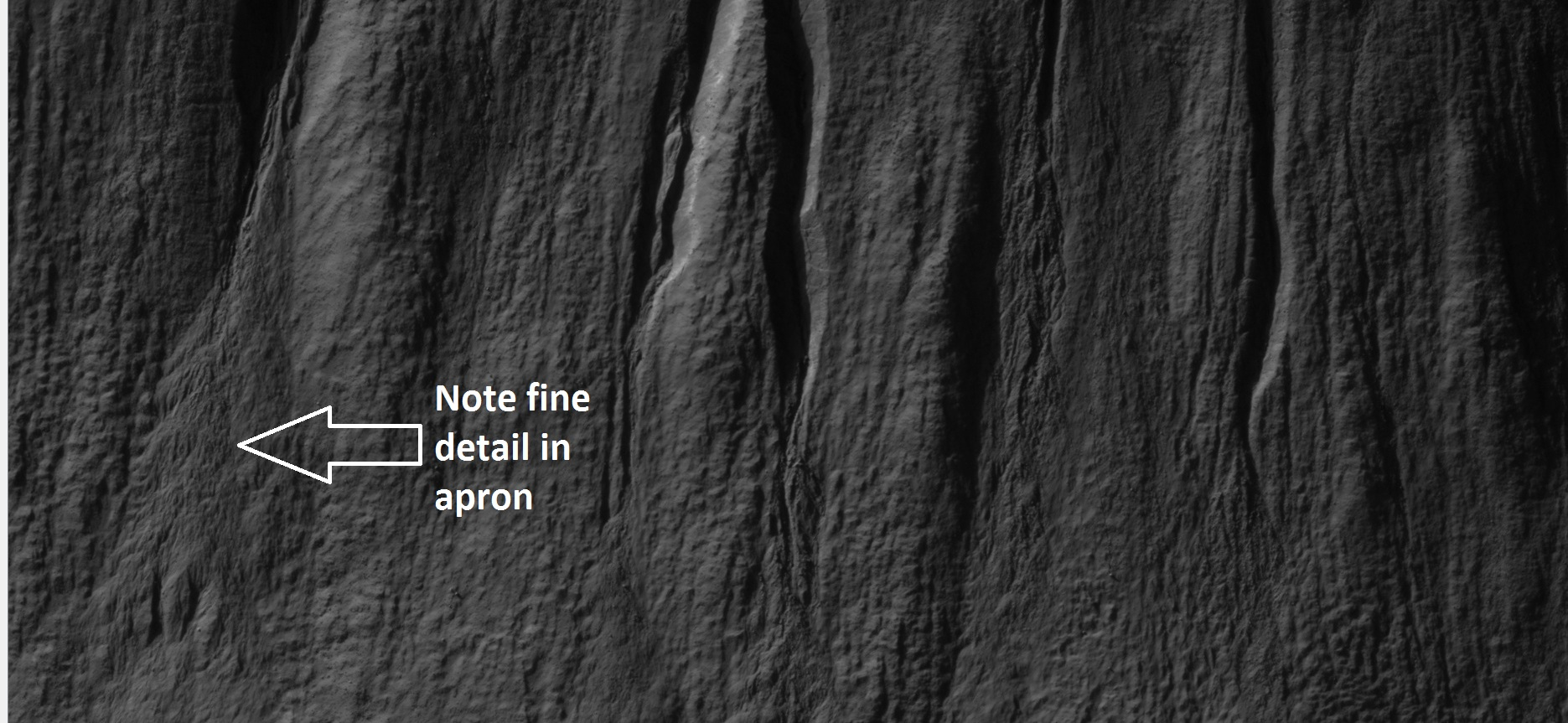
Close-up of apron on one of the gullies from previous image. Image was taken by HiRISE, under the HiWish program

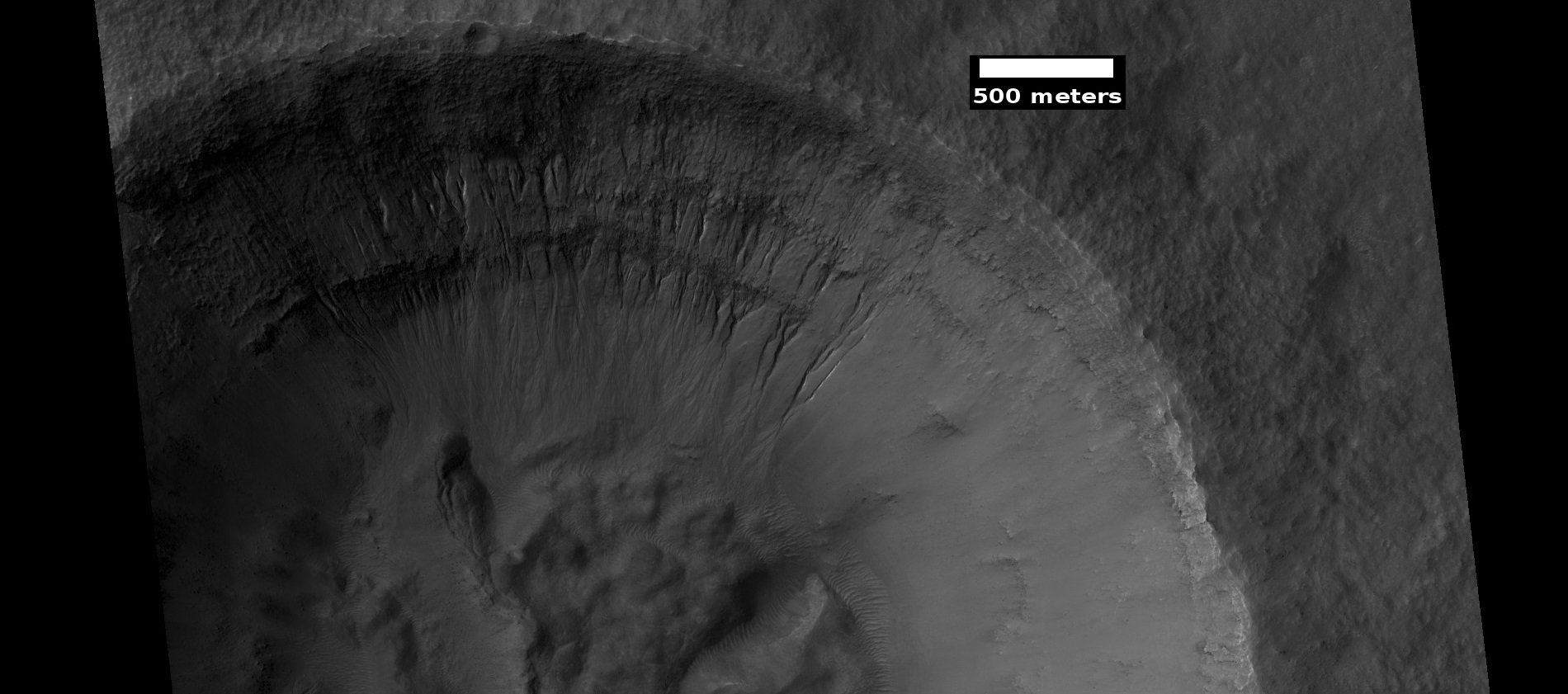
Gullies on two different levels in crater, as seen by HiRISE under HiWish program

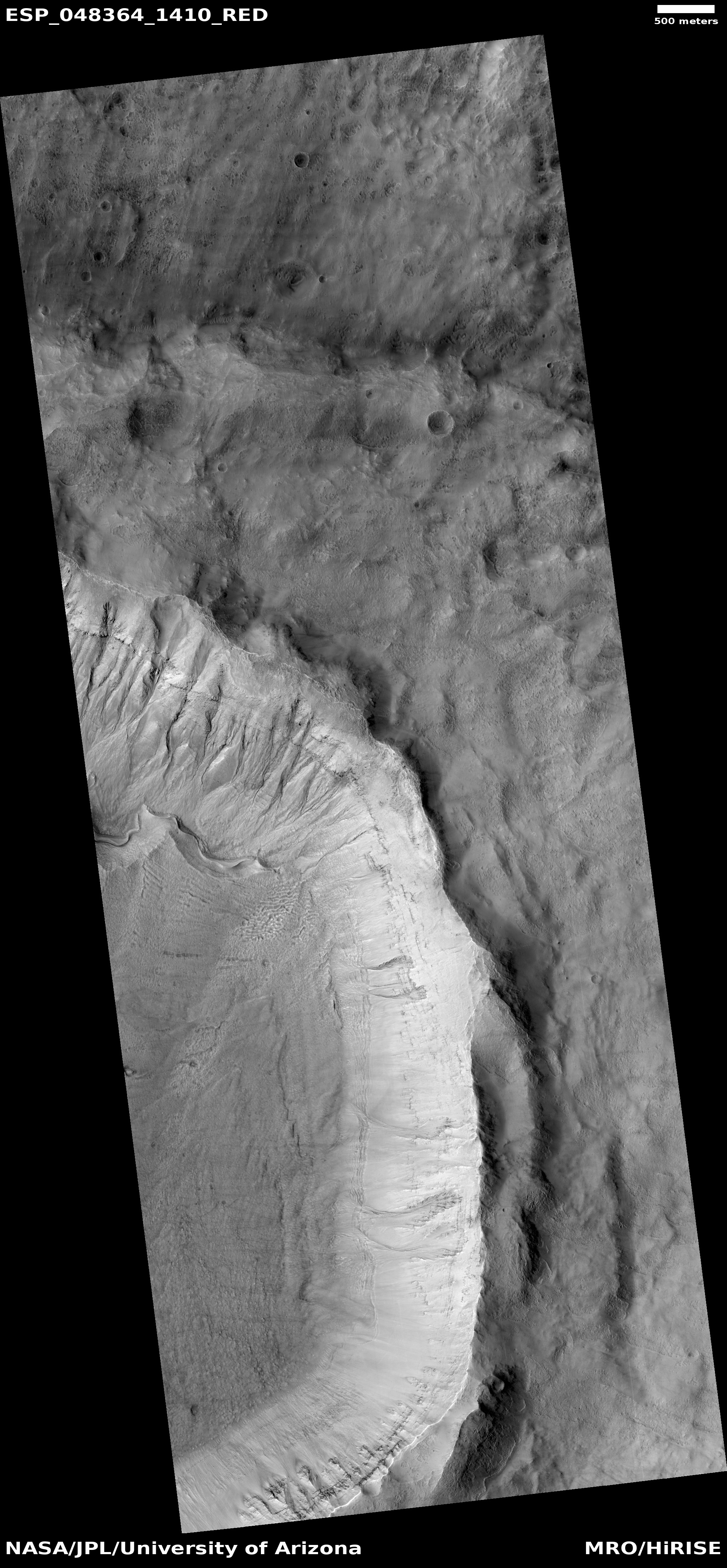
Crater with gullies, as seen by HiRISE under HiWish program

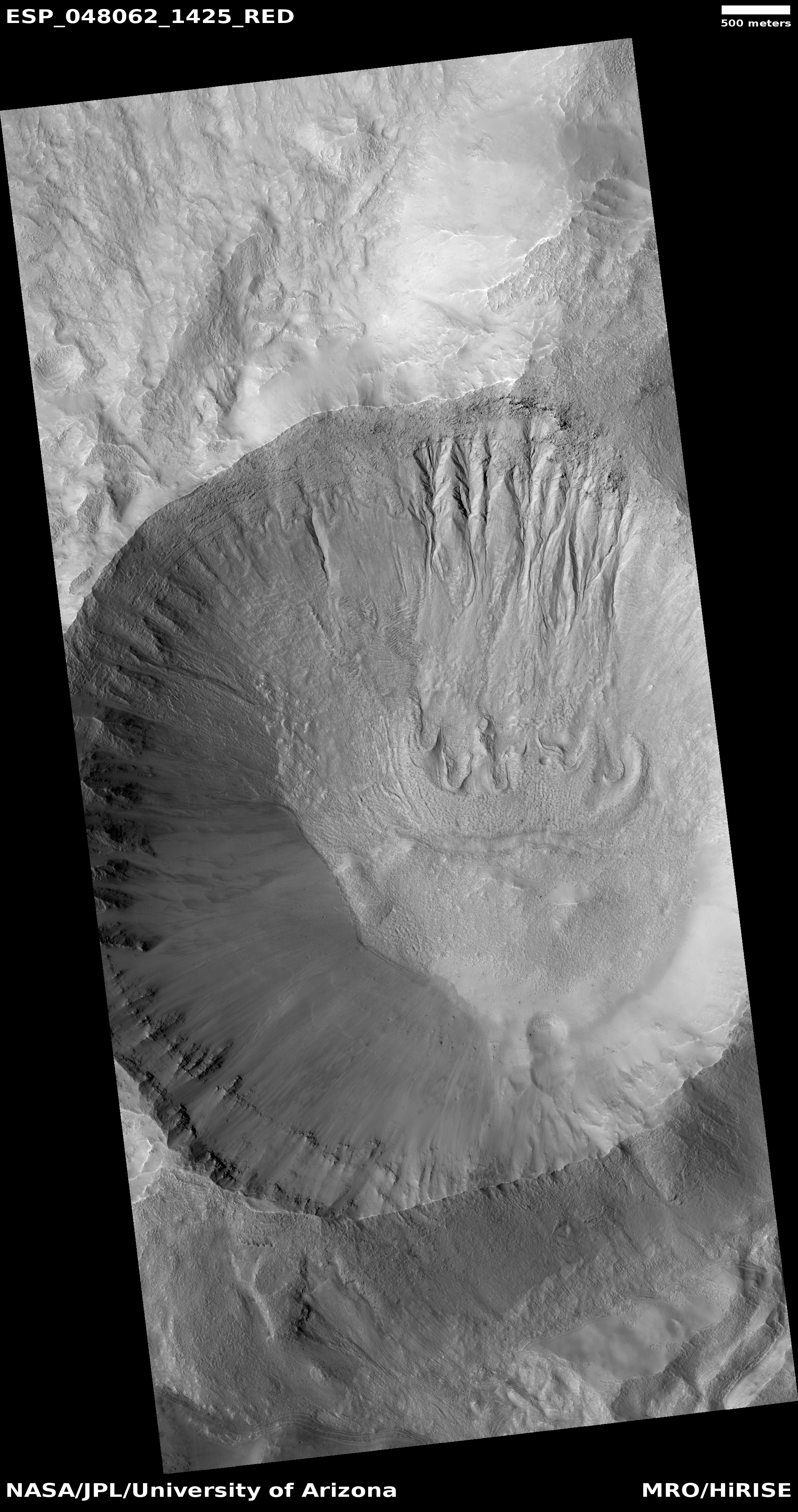
Crater with gullies, as seen by HiRISE under HiWish program

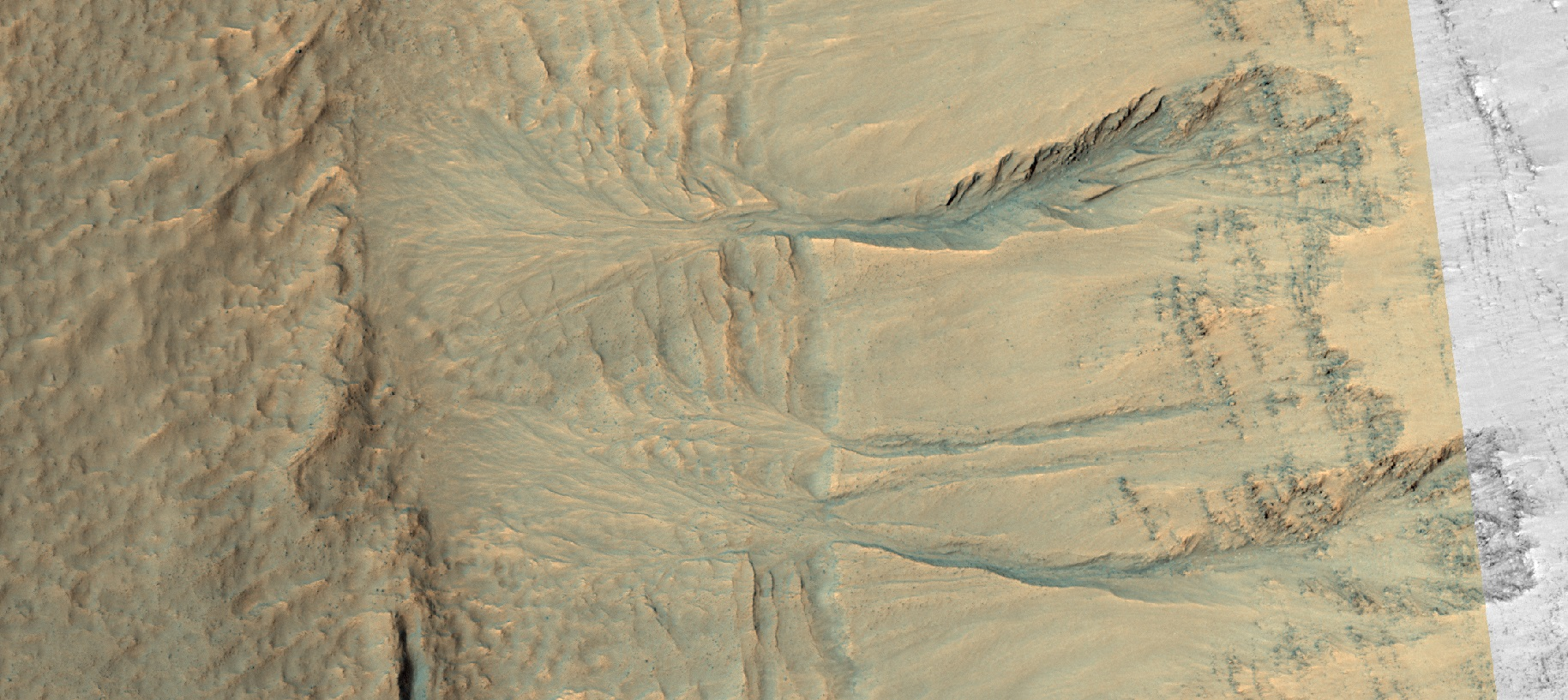
Gullies, as seen by HiRISE Picture is about 1 km across.

Argyre quadrangle gullies

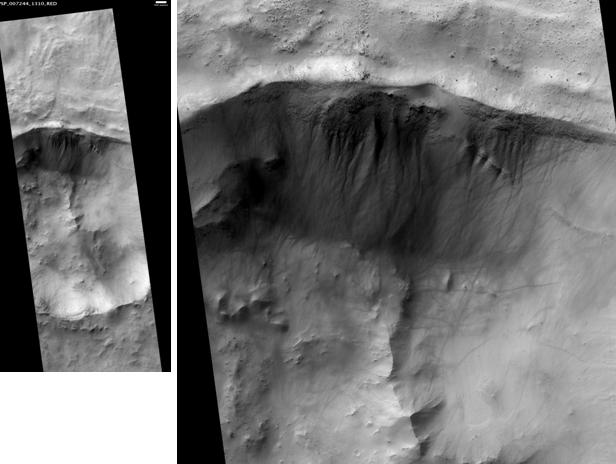
Jezza Crater, as seen by HiRISE. North wall (at top) has gullies. Dark lines are dust devil tracks. Scale bar is 500 meters long.

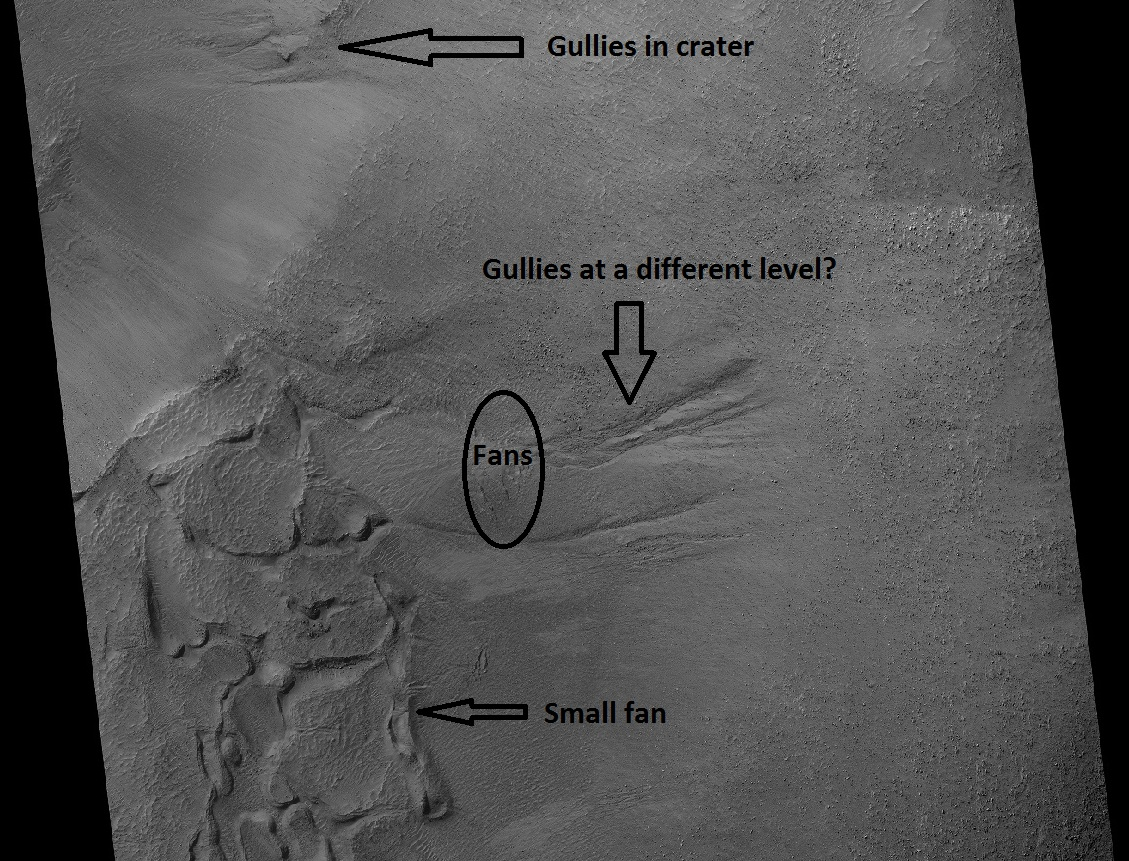
Scene in Argyre quadrangle with gullies, alluvival fans, and hollows, as seen by HiRISE under HiWish program. Enlargements of parts of this image are below.

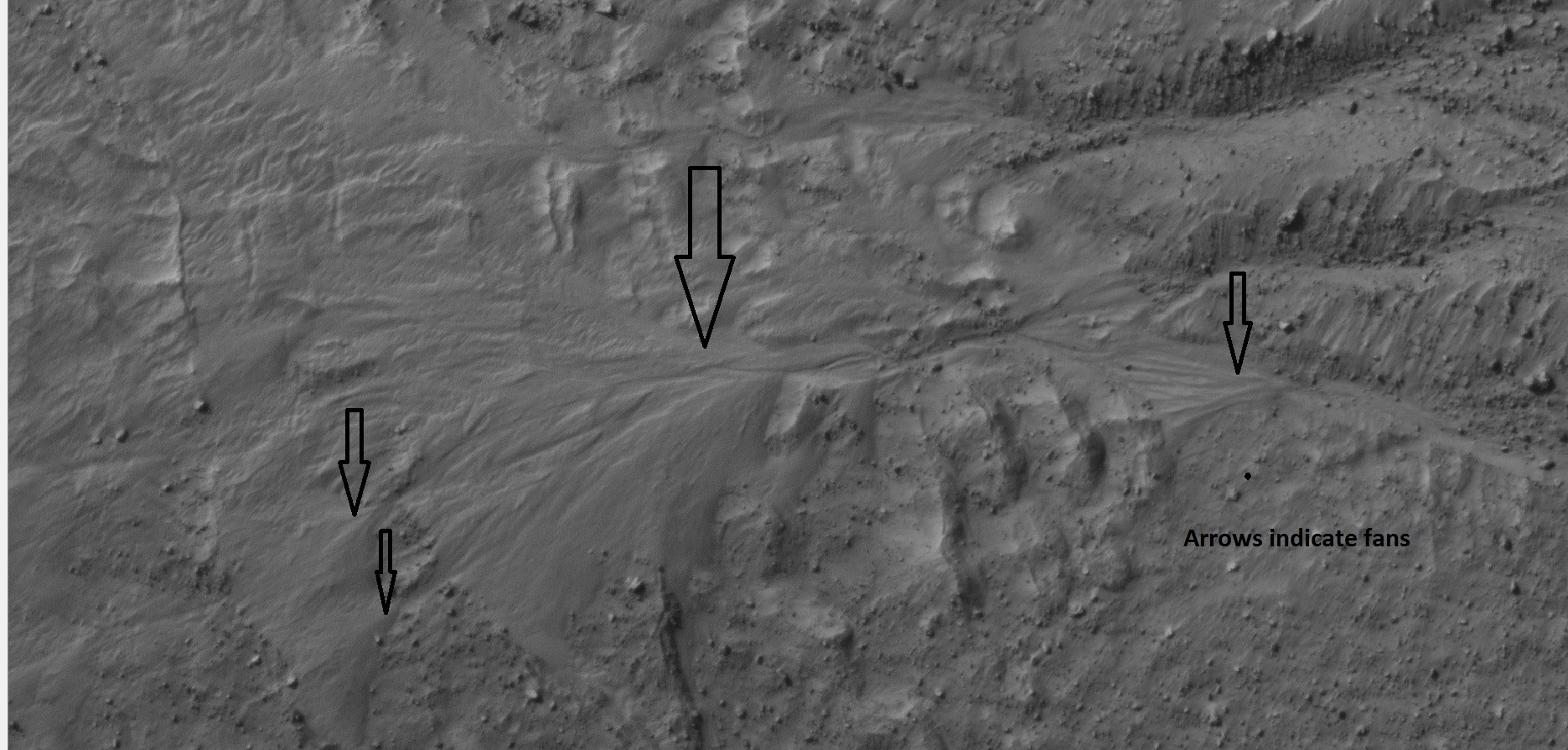
Several levels of alluvial fans, as seen by HiRISE under HiWish program. Locations of these fans are indicated in the previous image.

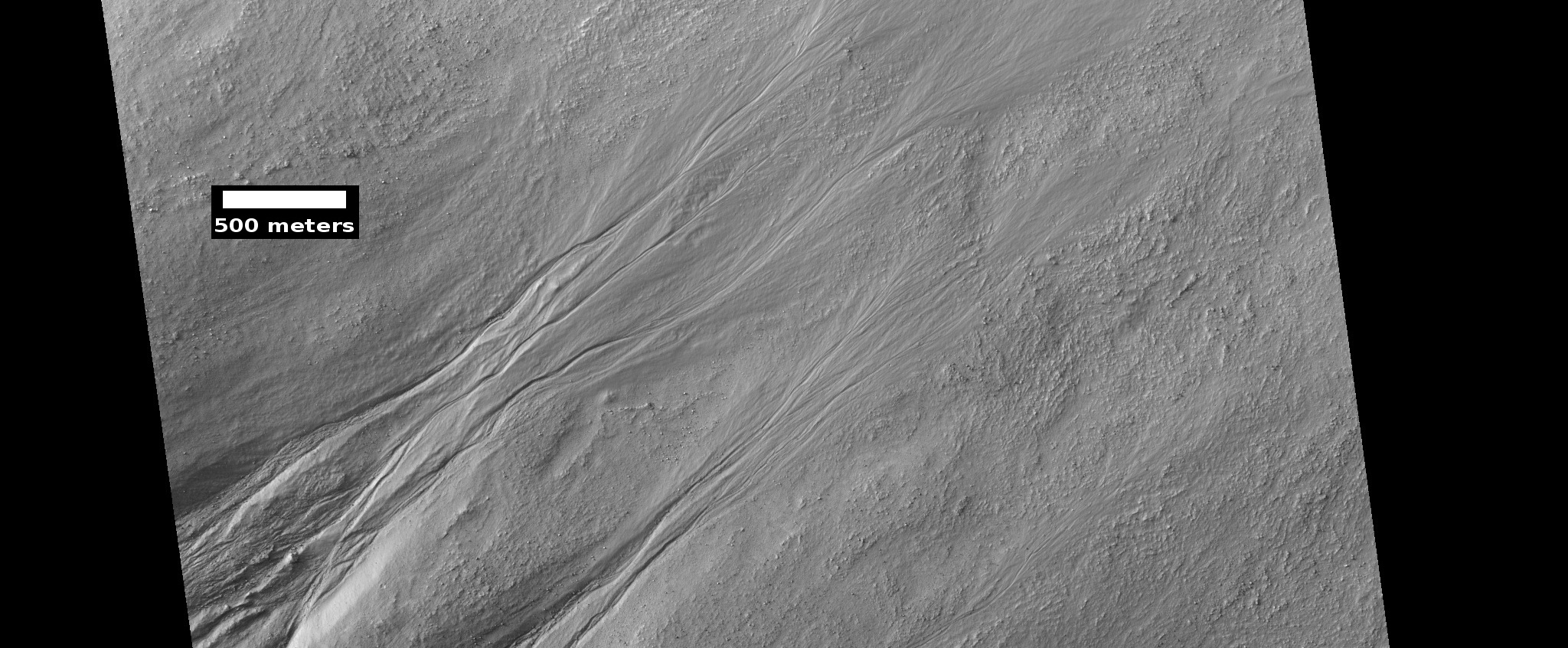
Gullies in Nereidum Montes, as seen by HiRISE under HiWish program.

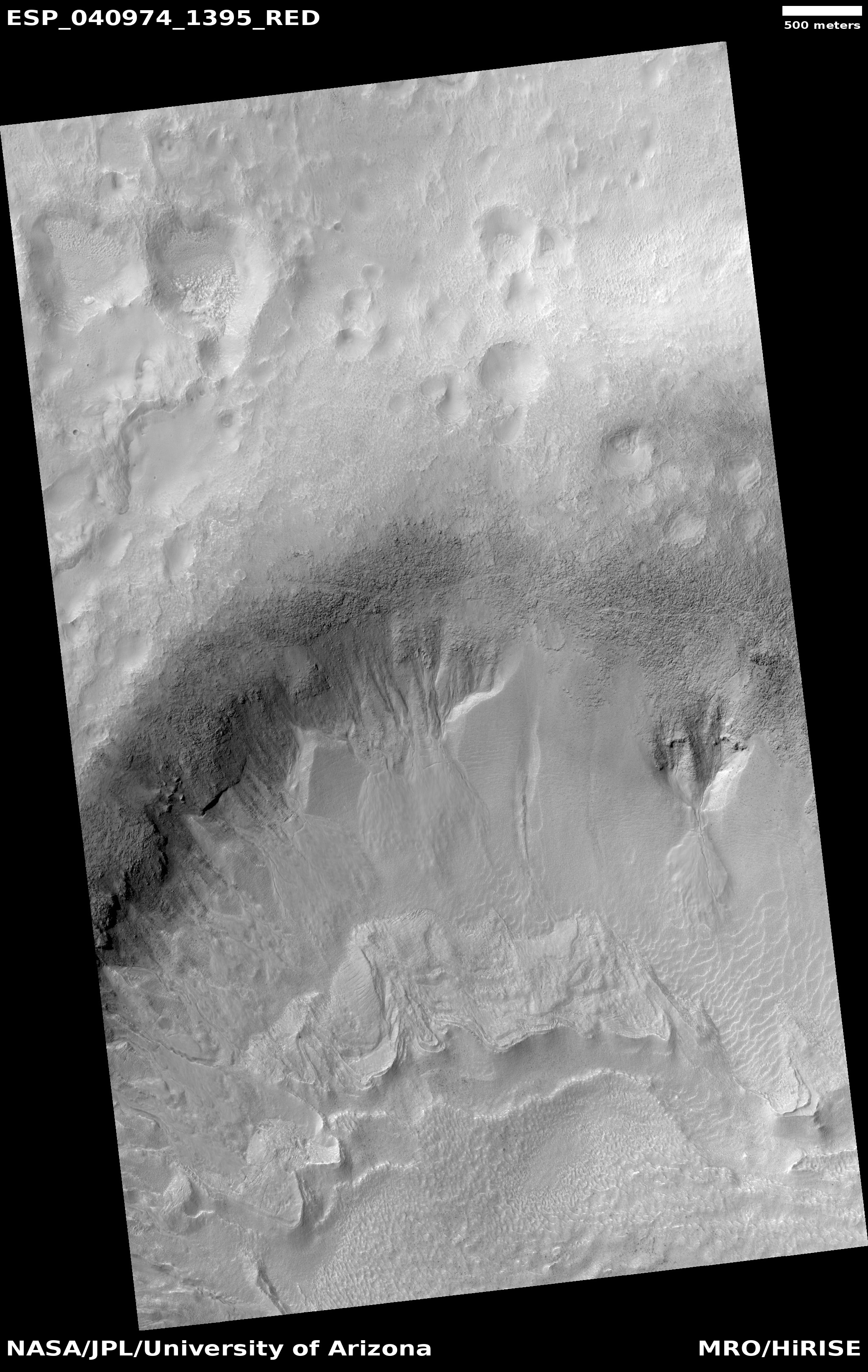
Wide view of gullies in Arkhangelsky Crater, as seen by HiRISE under HiWish program

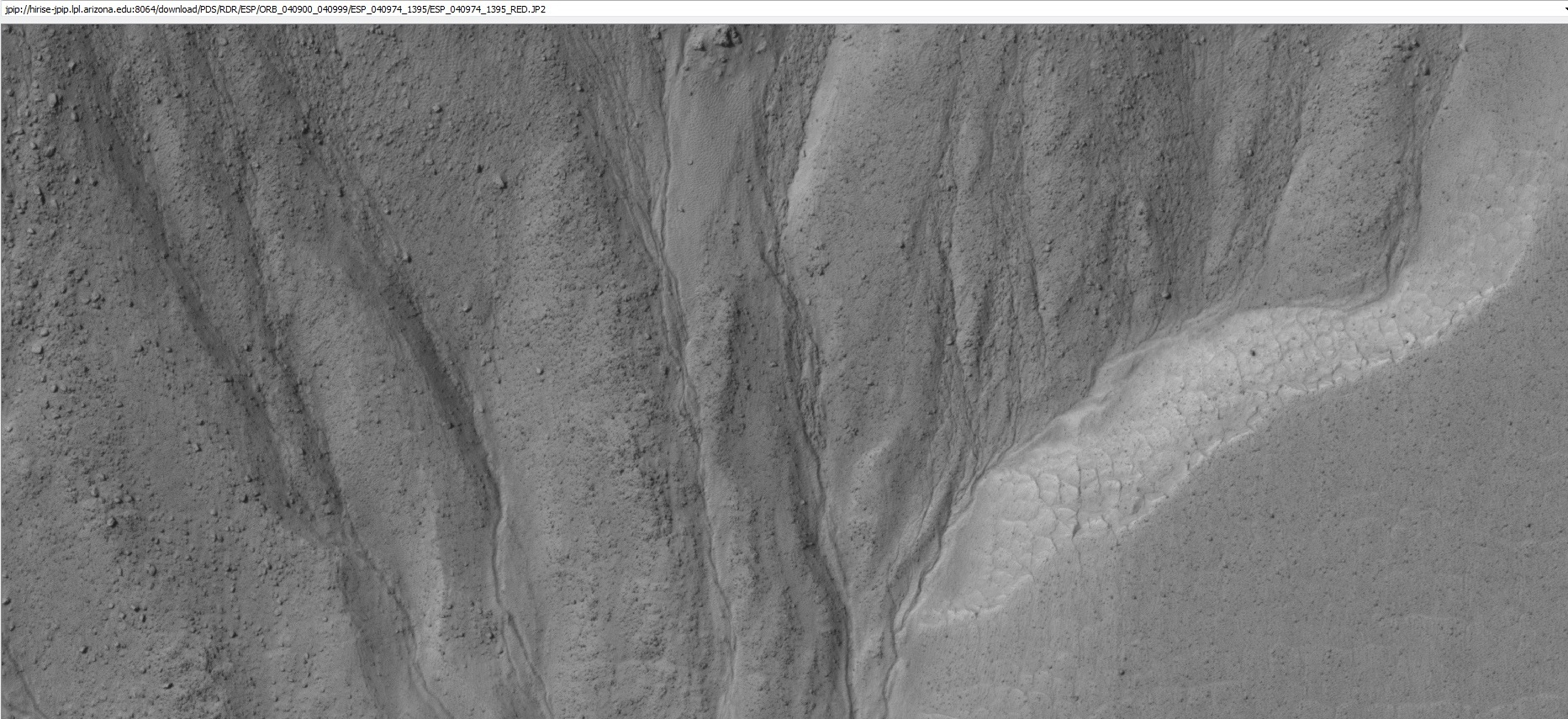
Close-up of small channels in gullies in Arkhangelsky Crater, as seen by HiRISE under HiWish program Patterned ground in the shape of polygons can be seen to the right. Note: this is an enlargement of the previous image from Arkhangelsky Crater.

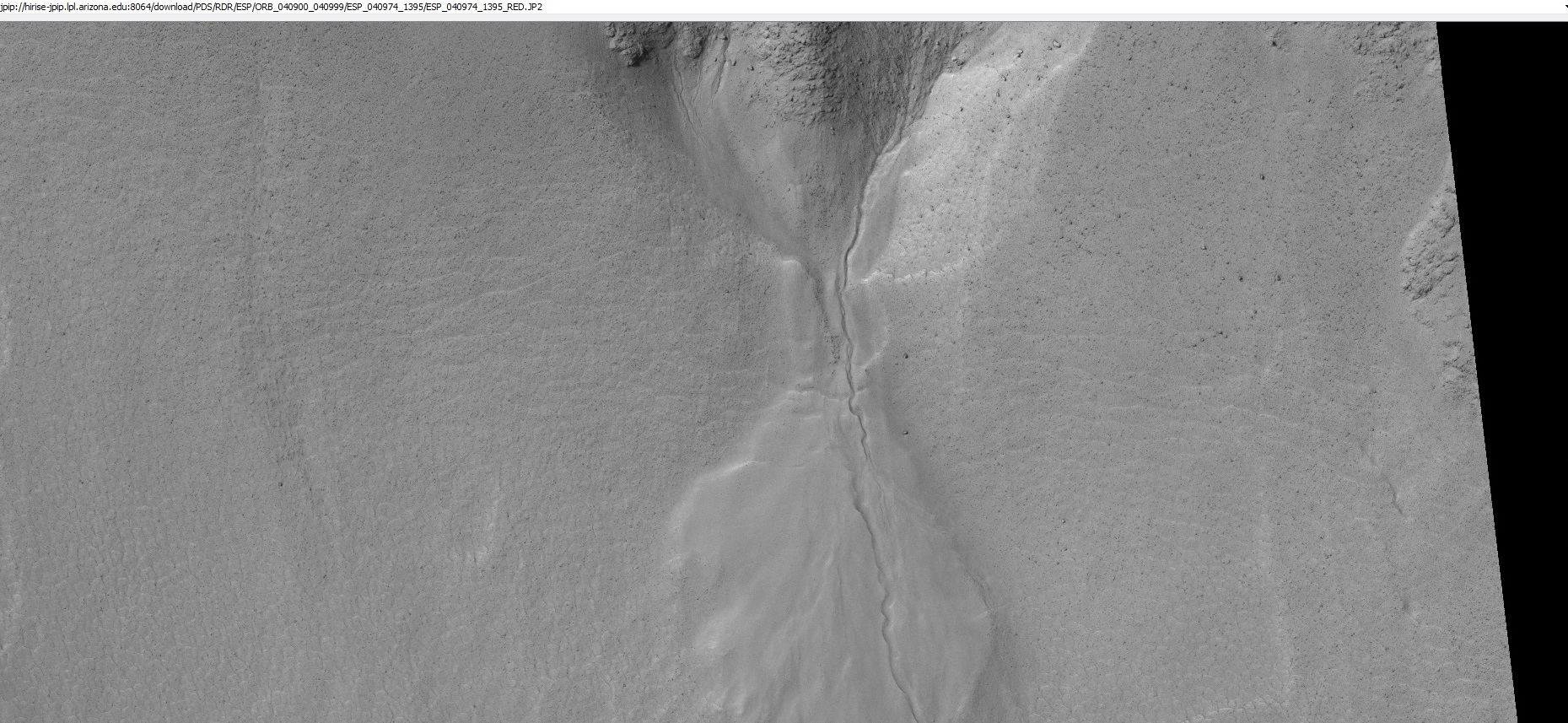
Close-up of a gully showing a channel going across the apron, as seen by HiRISE under HiWish program. Note: this is an enlargement of a previous image from Arkhangelsky Crater.
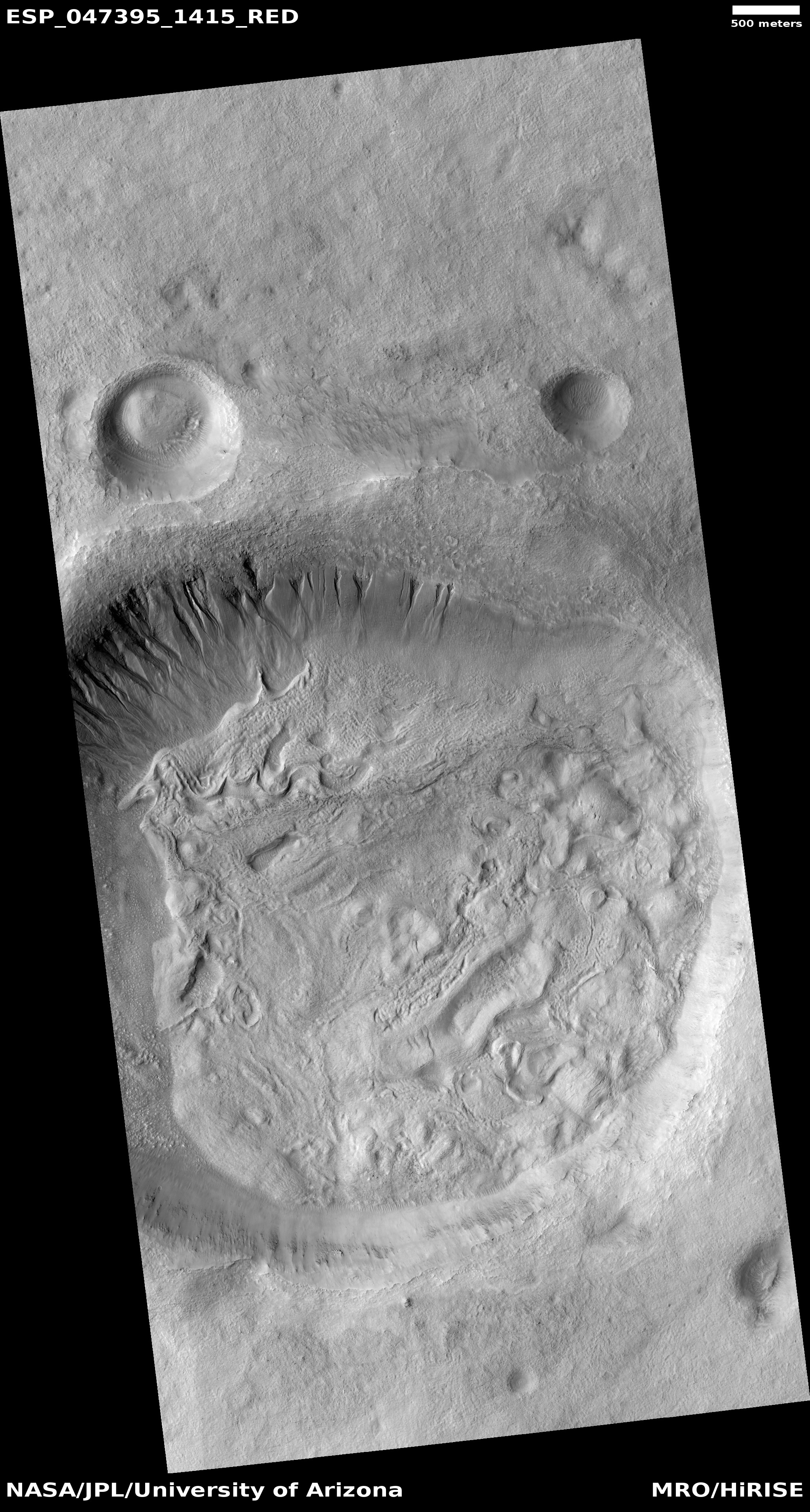
Gullies in crater, as seen by HiRISE under HiWish program

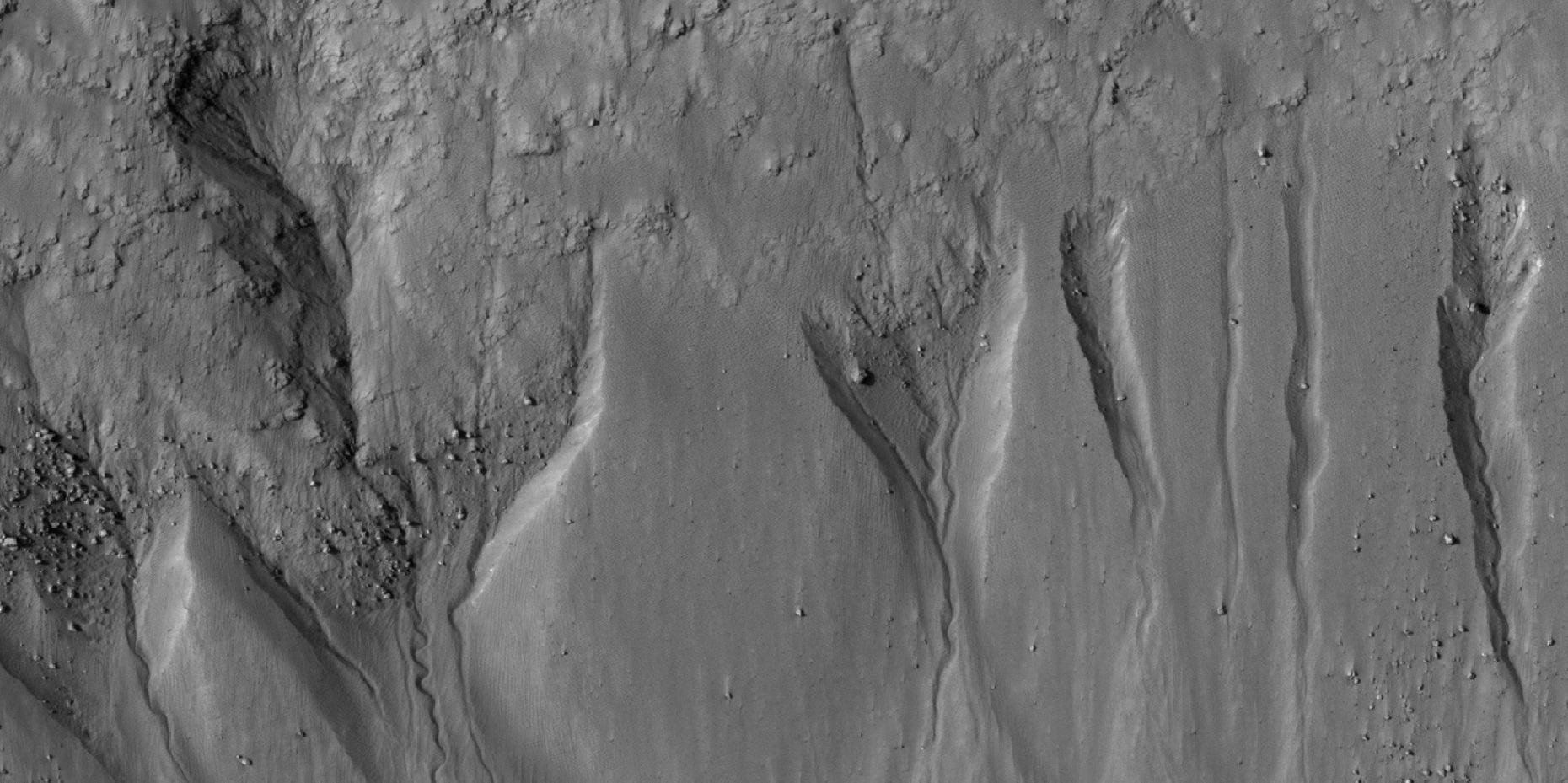
Close view of gullies from previous image The channels are quite curved. Because channels of gullies often form curves, it was thought that they were made by flowing water. Today, it is thought that they could be produced with chunks of dry ice. The image is from HiRISE under HiWish program.

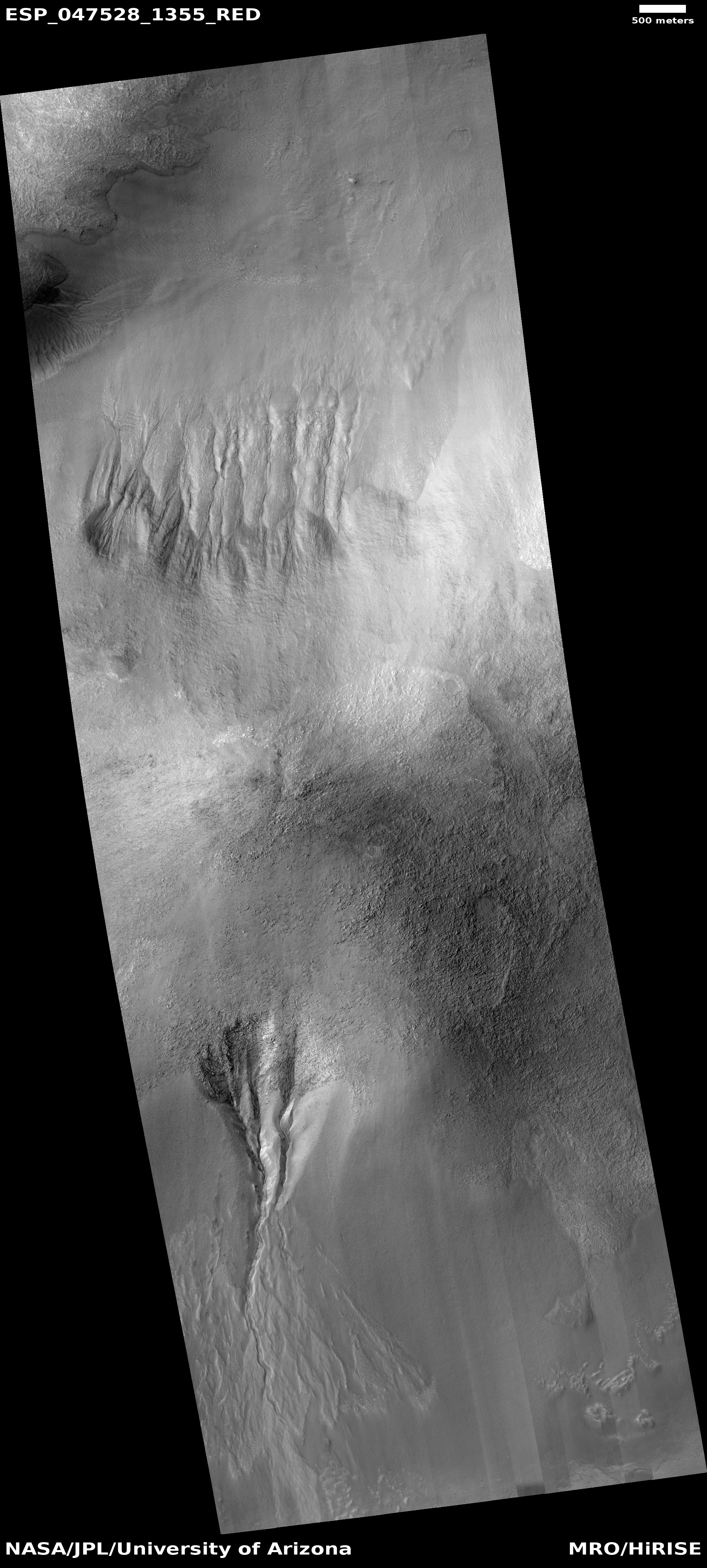
Gullies on two sides of a mound, as seen by HiRISE under HiWish program

Thaumasia quadrangle gullies

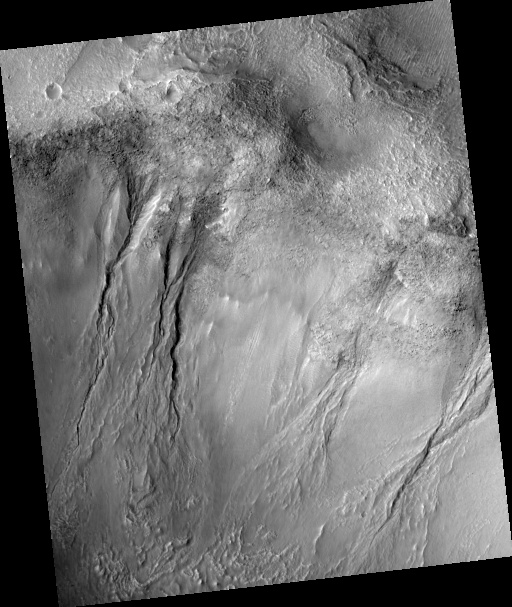
Group of gullies, as seen by HiRISE under the HiWish program.

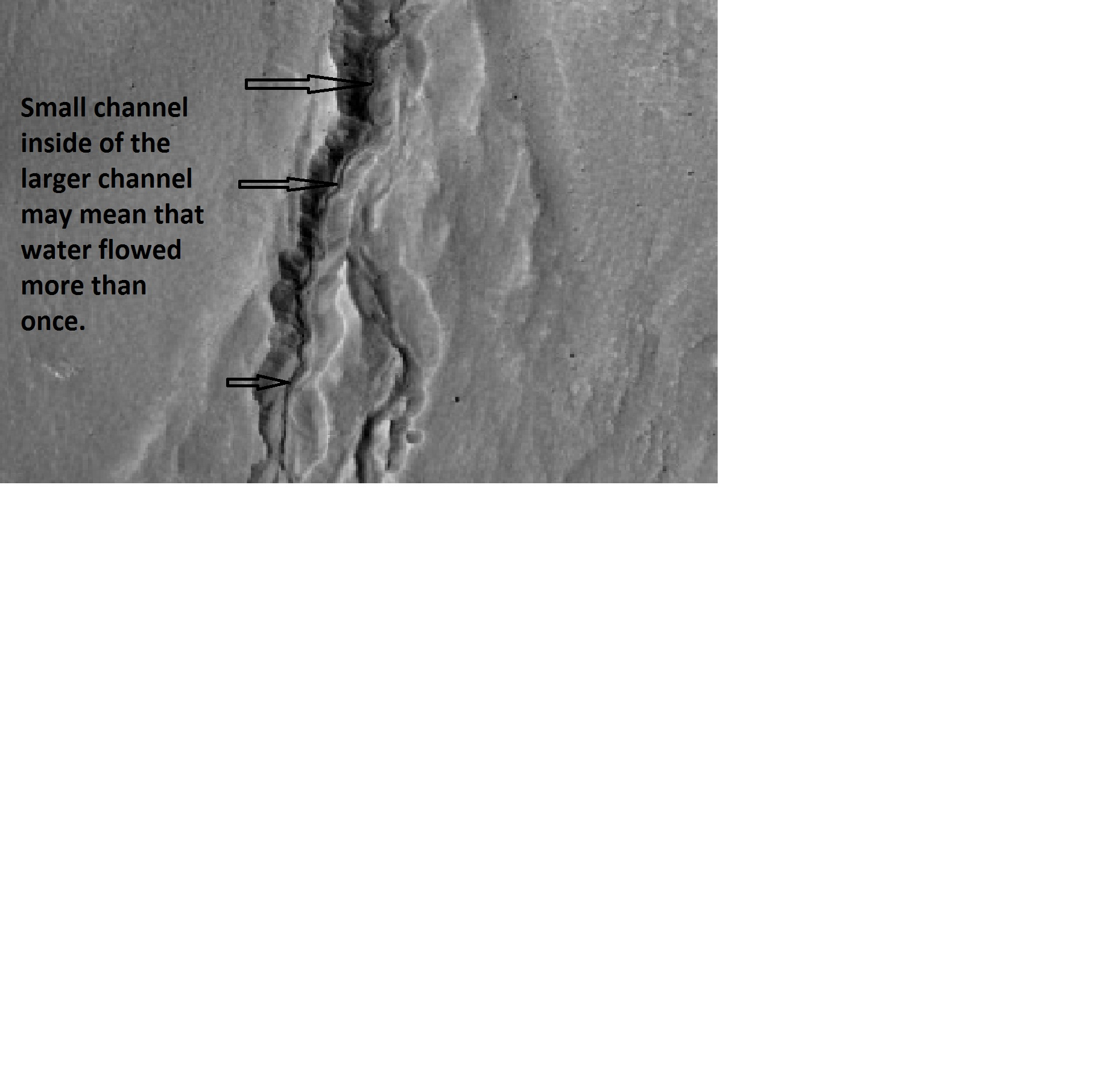
Enlargement of part of previous image showing smaller gullies inside larger ones. Water probably flowed in these gullies more than once.

Mare Acidalium quadrangle gullies

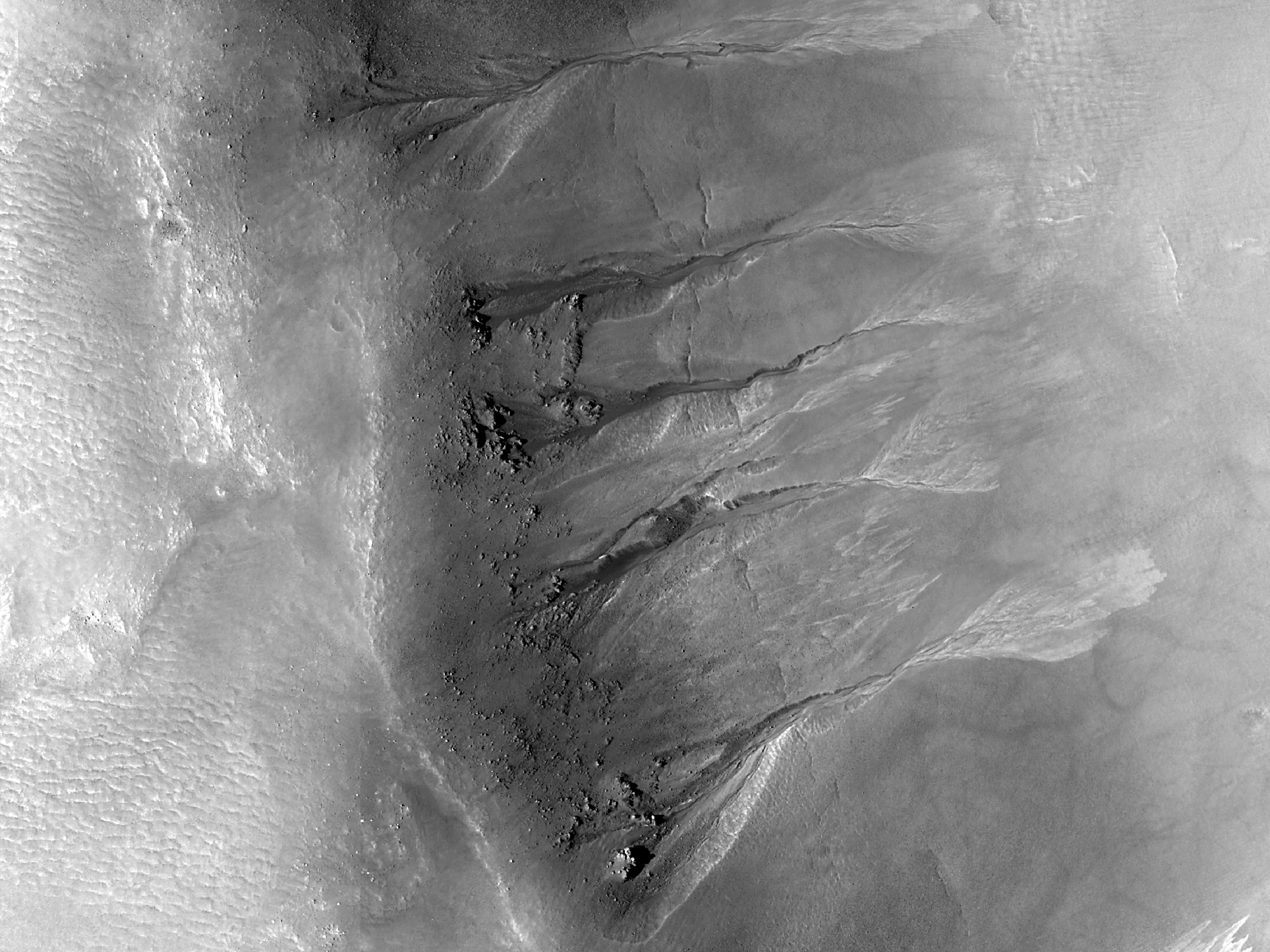
Gullies on crater wall The bright apron is a bit unusual.

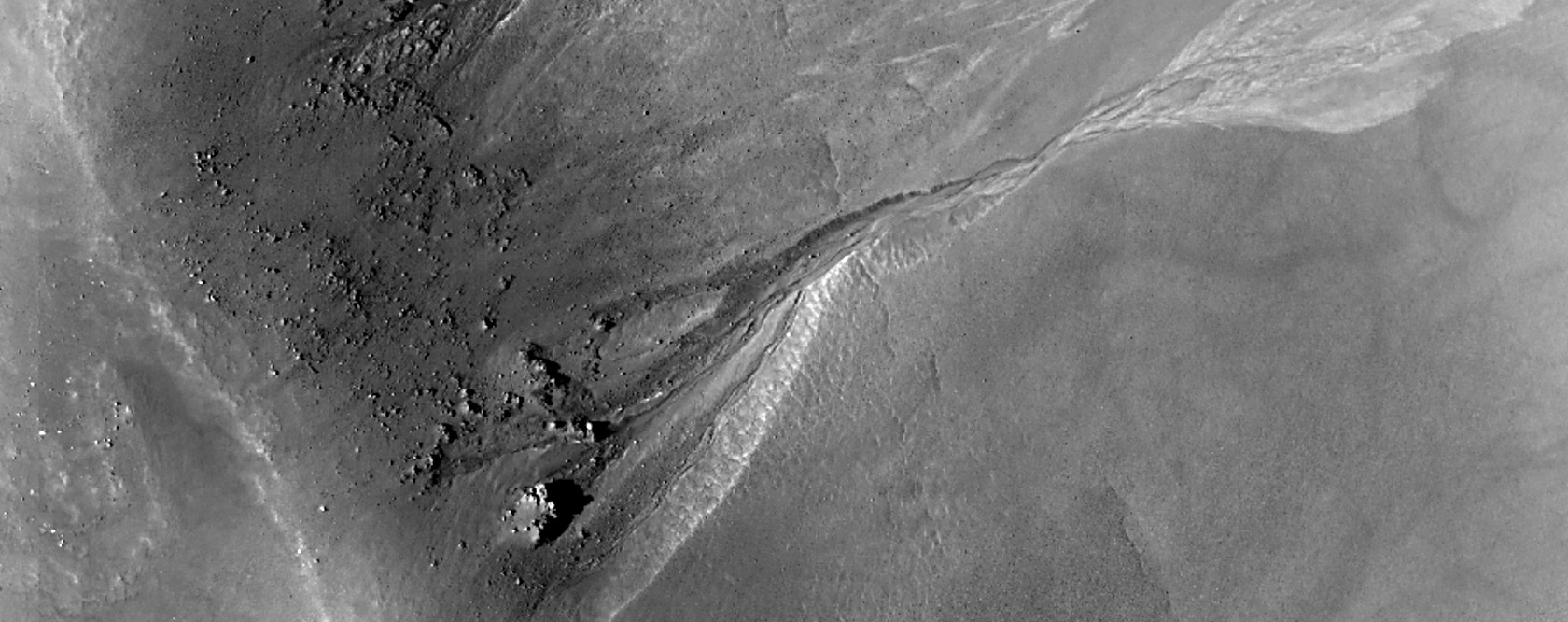
Gully on crater wall The bright apron is a bit unusual.
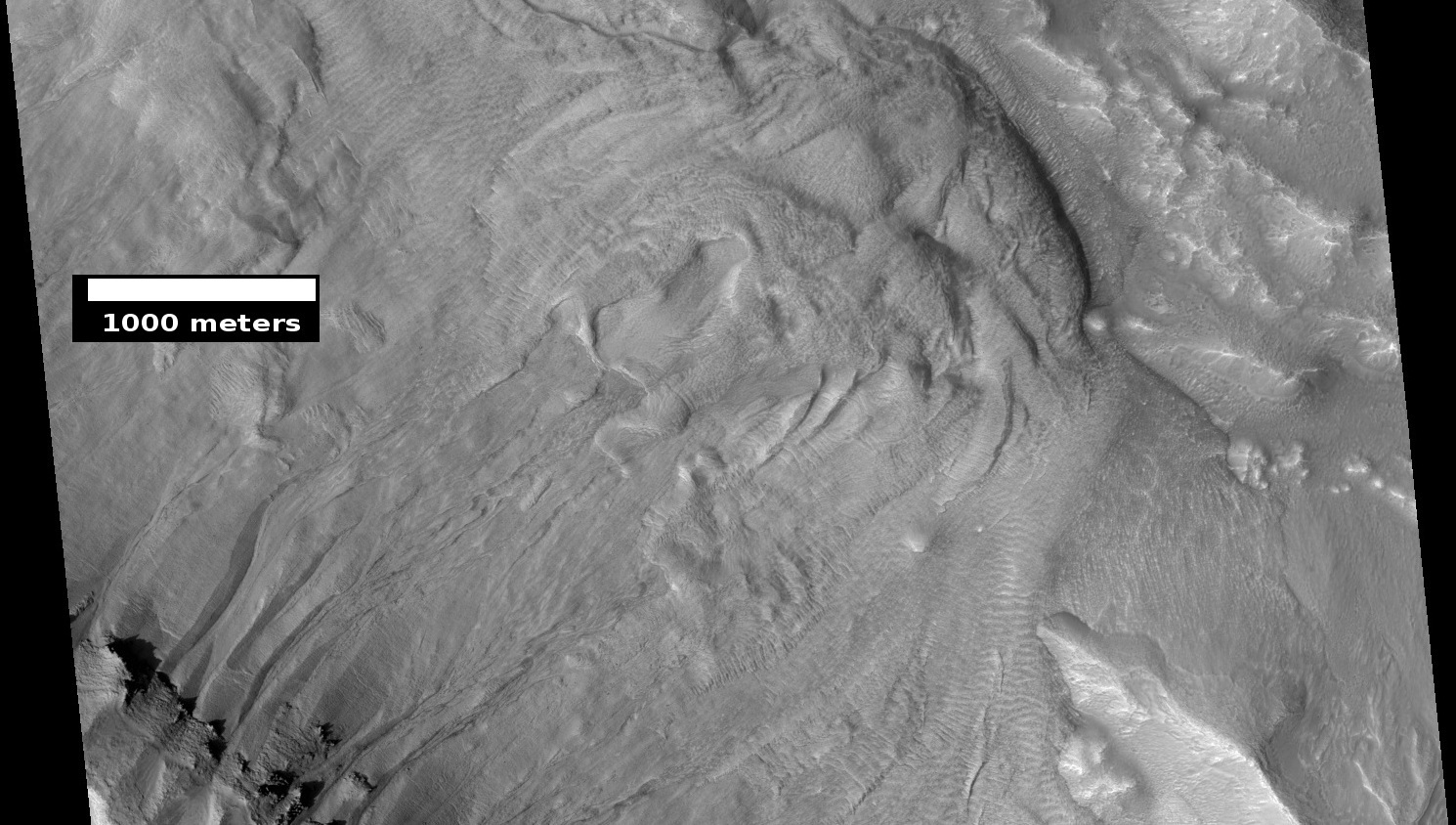
Gullies and massive flow of material, as seen by HiRISE under HiWish program. Gullies are enlarged in next two images. Location is Bamberg crater.

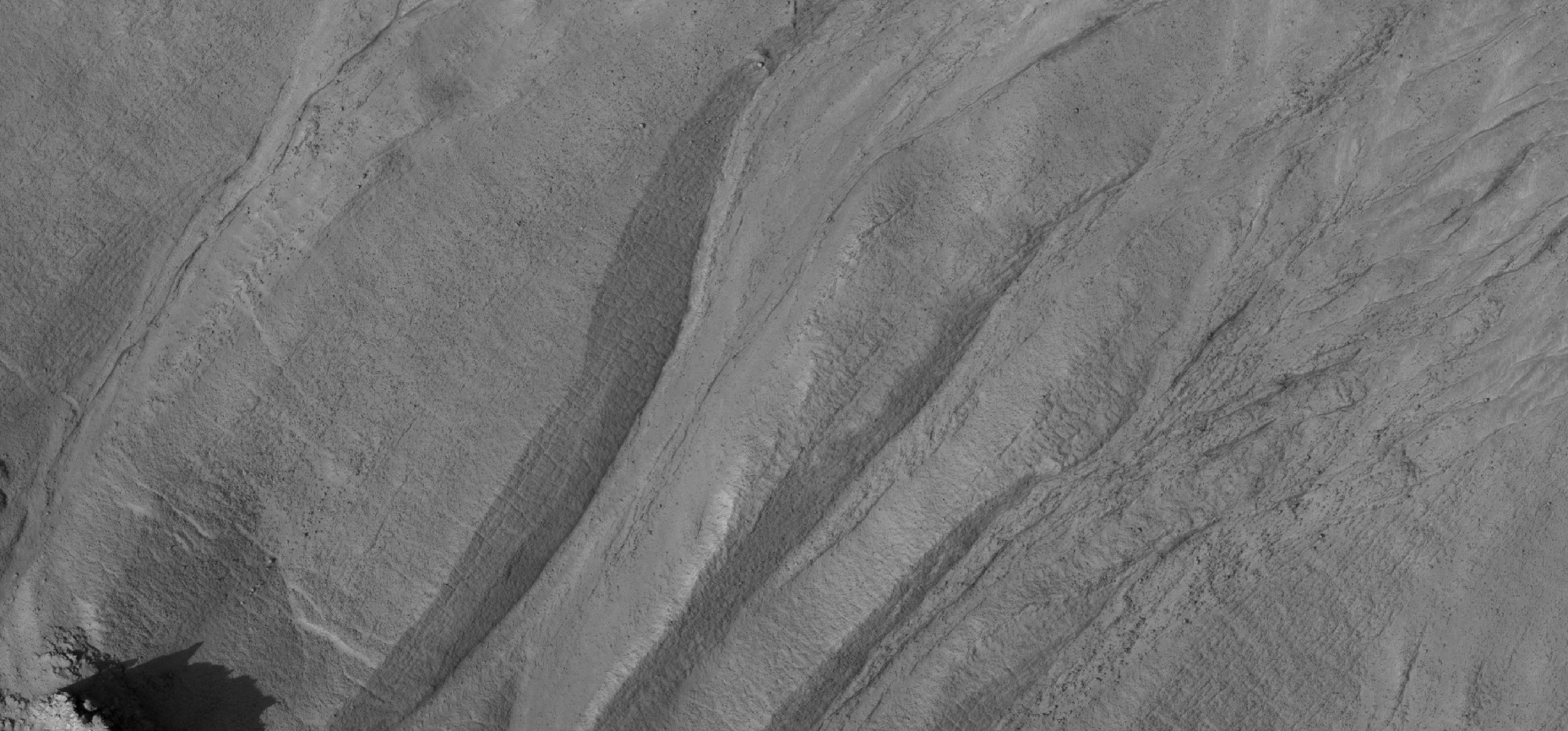
Close up view of some gullies, as seen by HiRISE under the HiWish program.

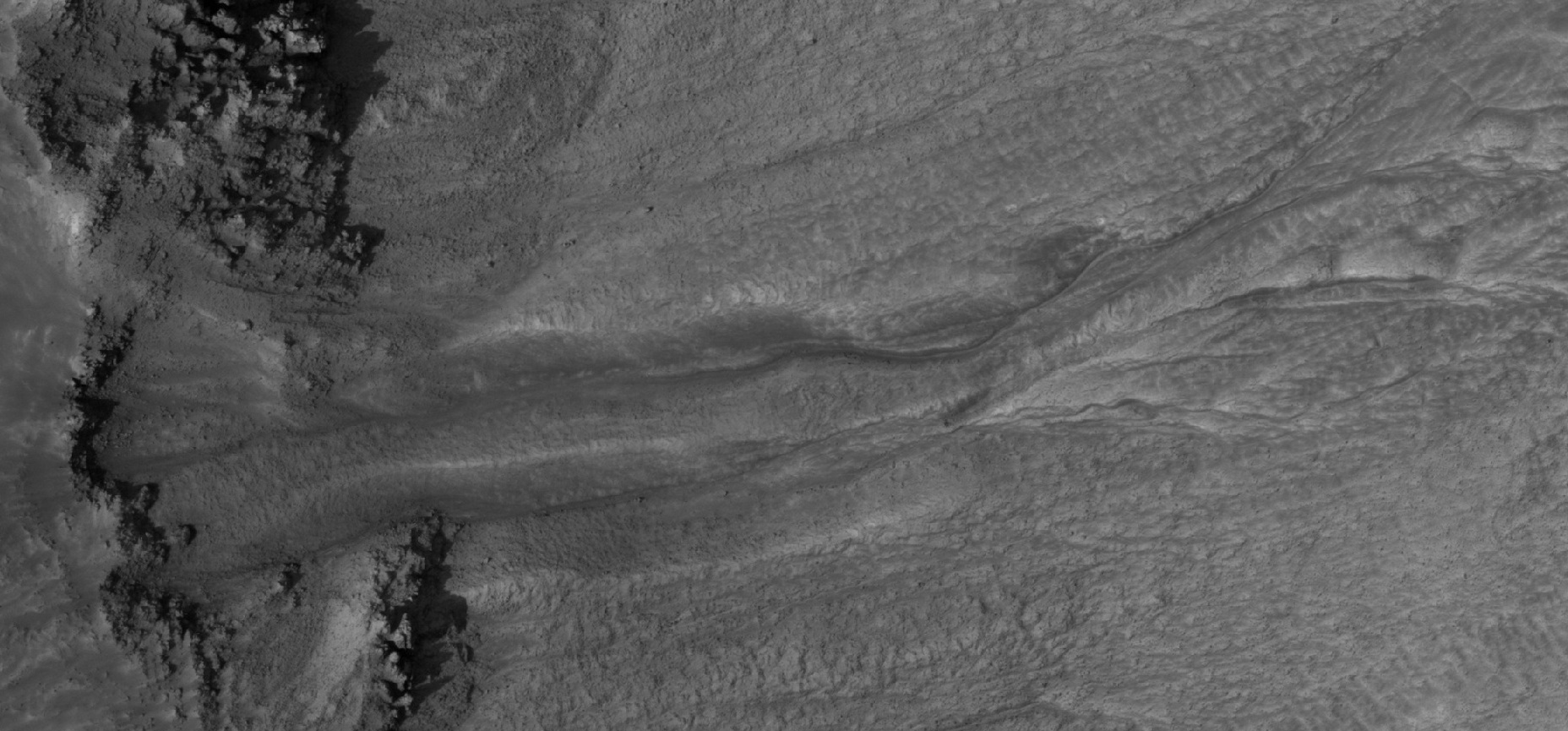
Close up view of another gully in same HiRISE picture. Picture taken under HiWish program.

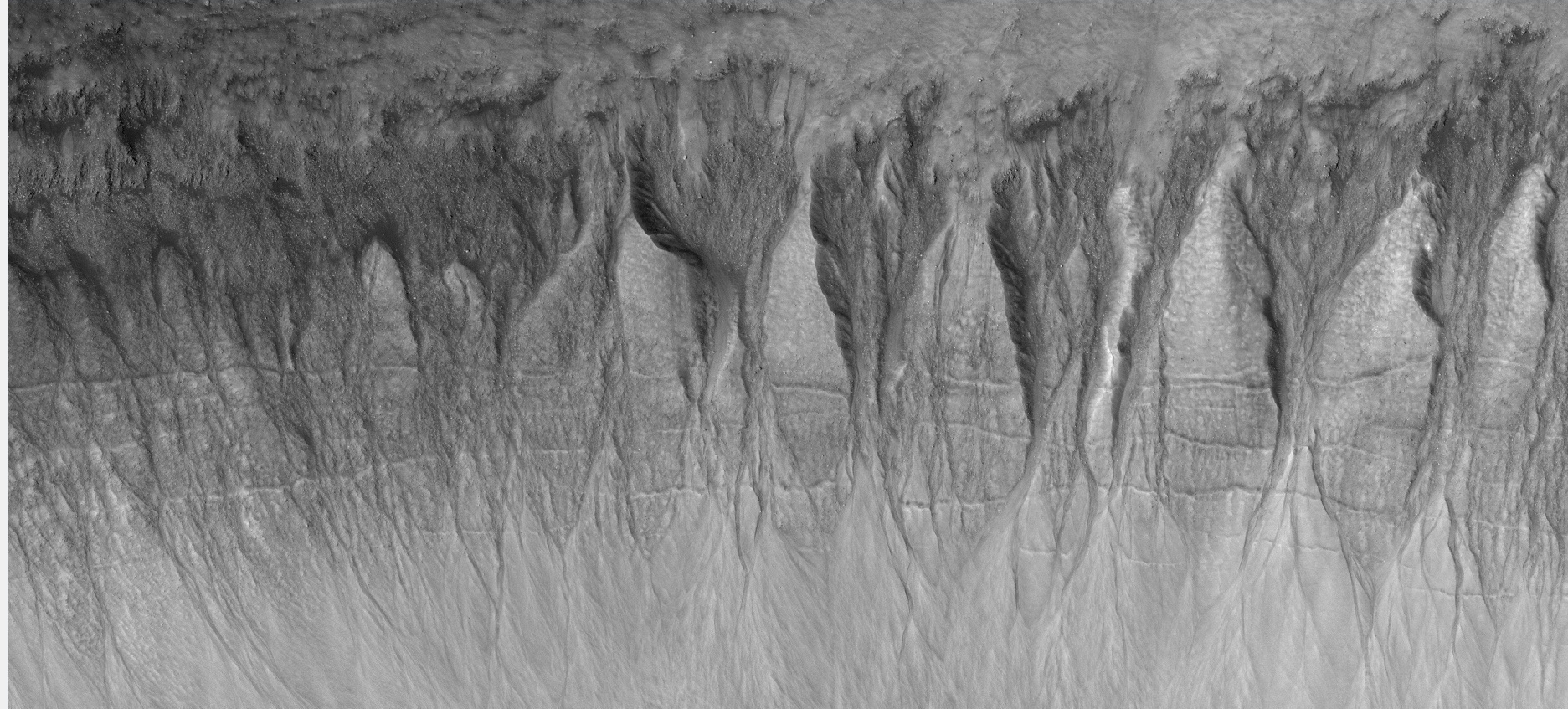
Gullies, as seen by HiRISE under HiWish program.

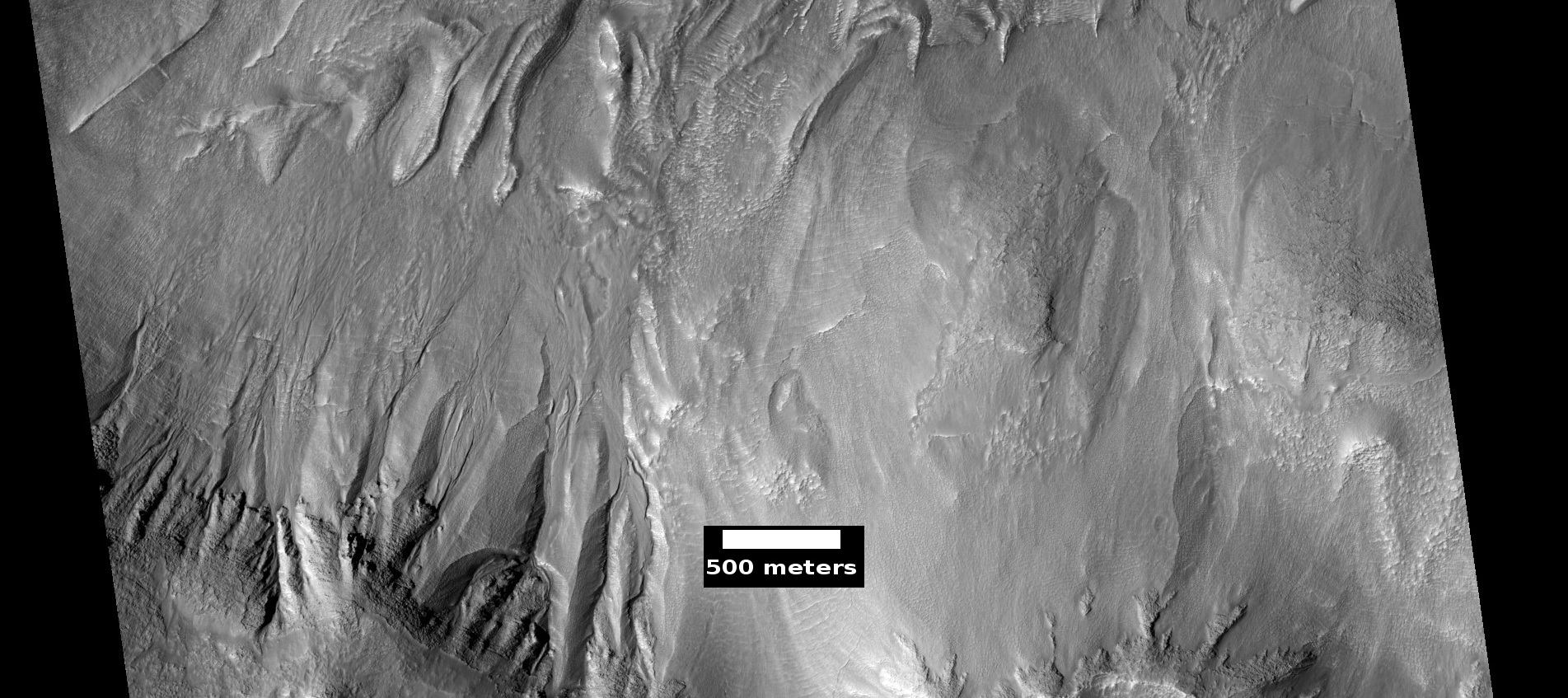
Gullies in a crater, as seen by HiRISE under HiWish program.

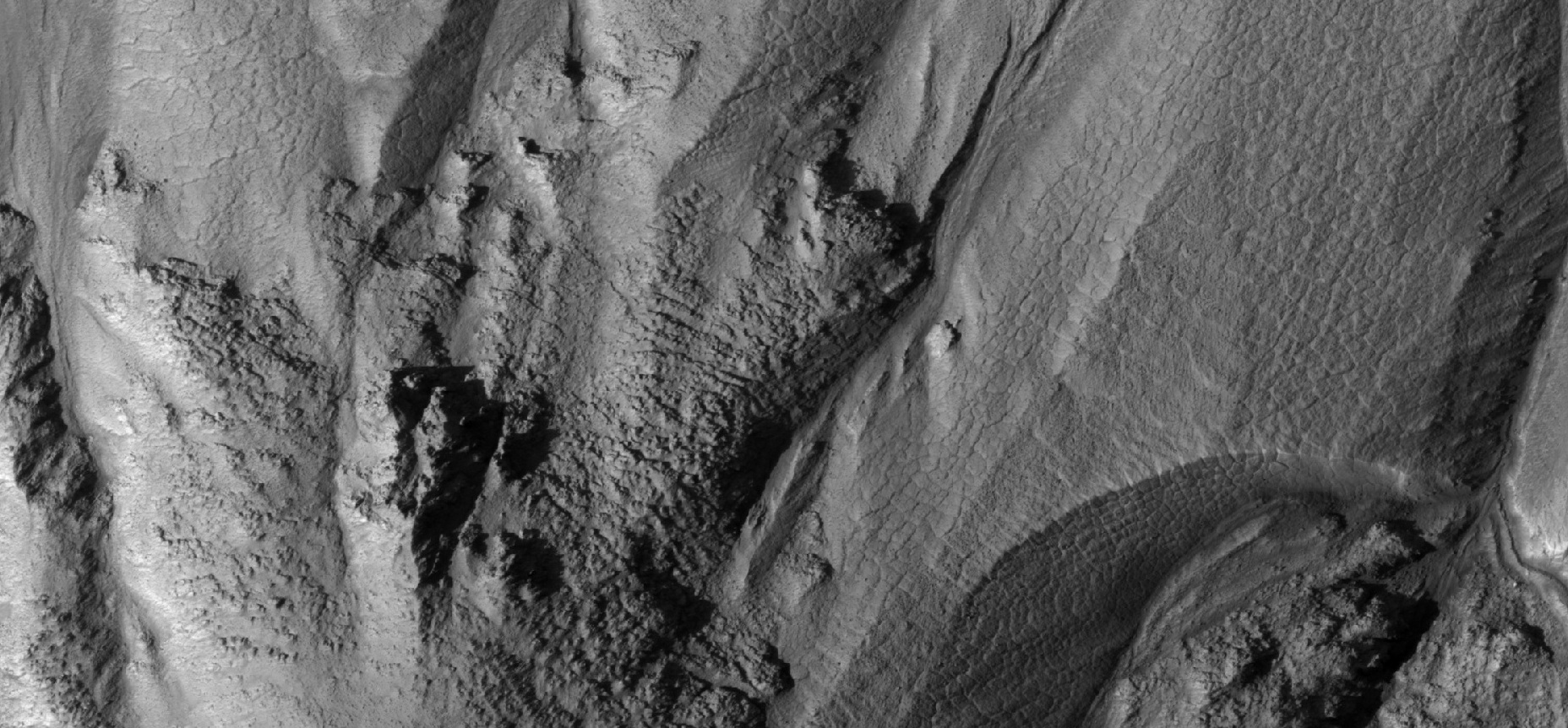
Close-up of gullies in a crater from previous image. Image taken by HiRISE under HiWish program.

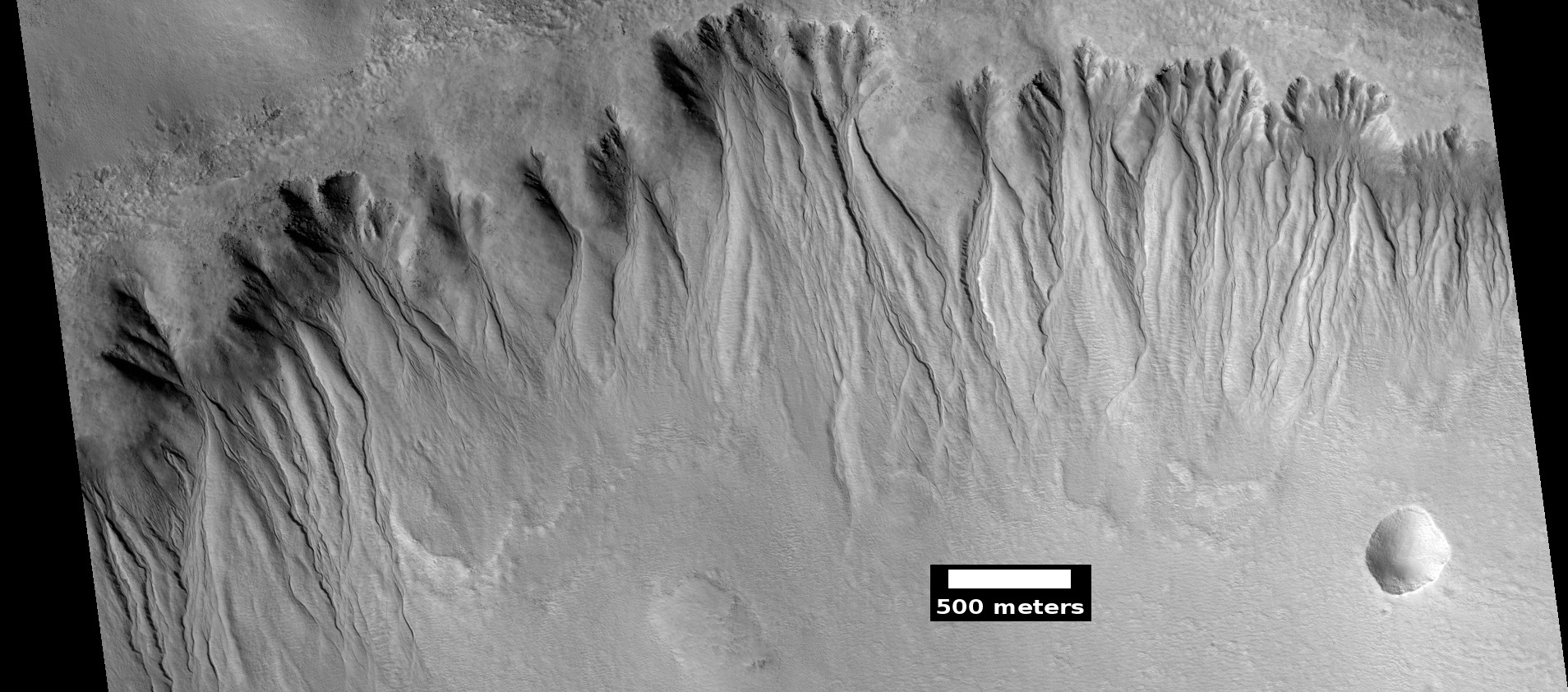
Gullies on wall of crater, as seen by HiRISE under HiWish program Location is the Mare Acidalium quadrangle.

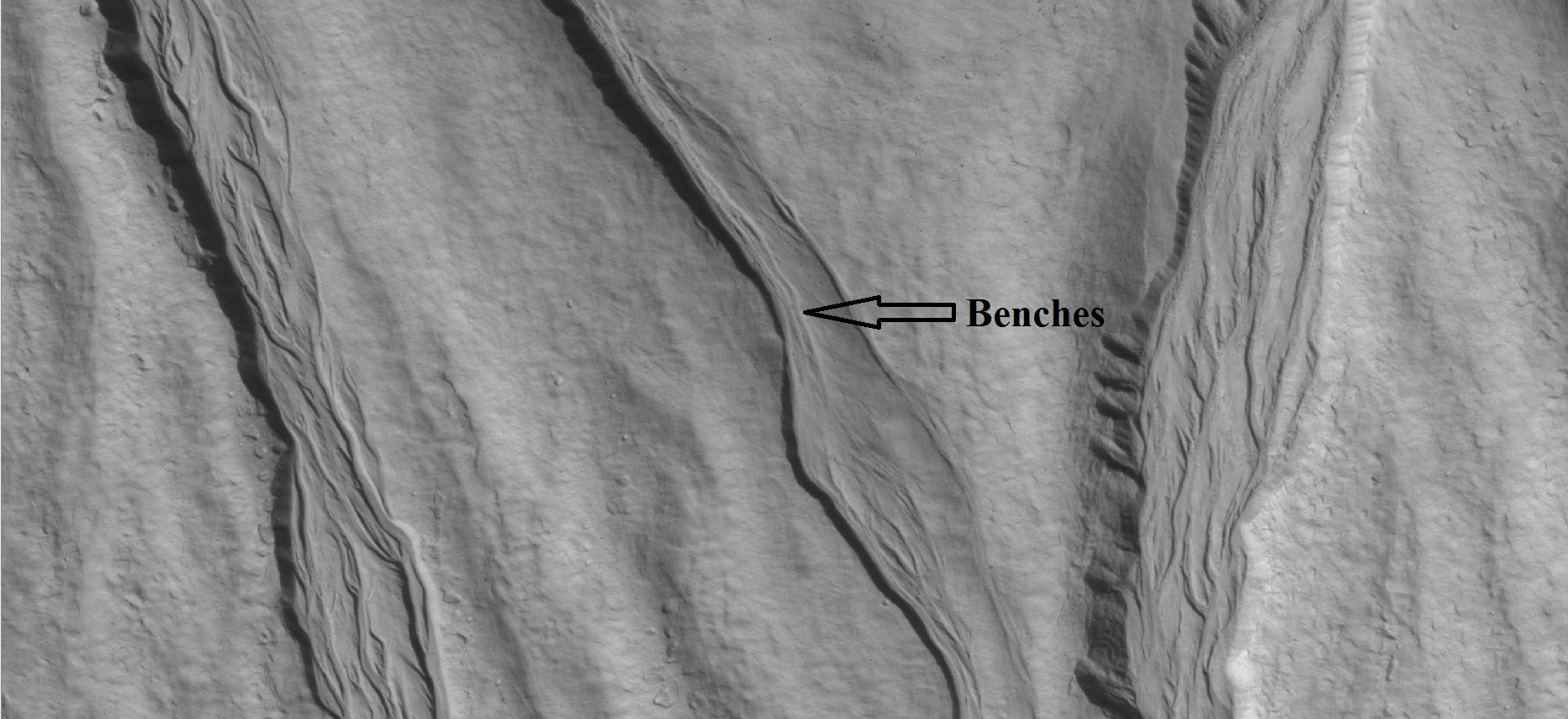
Close-up of gully channels, as seen by HiRISE under HiWish program. This image shows many streamlined forms and some benches along a channel. These features suggest formation by running water. Benches are usually formed when the water level goes down a bit and stays at that level for a time. Picture was taken with HiRISE under HiWish program. Location is the Mare Acidalium quadrangle. Note this is an enlargement of a previous image.

Arcadia quadrangle gullies

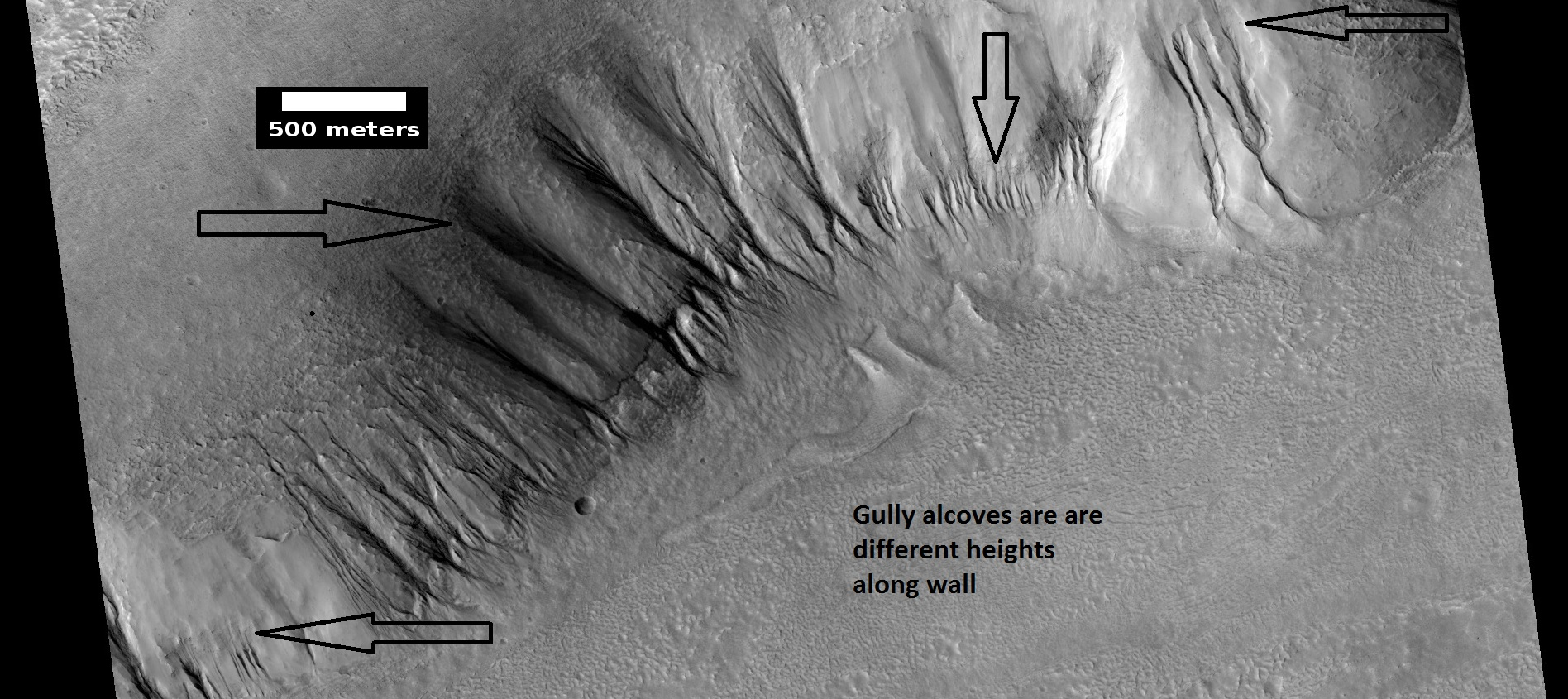
A variety of gullies originating at different levels are visible in this HiRISE image that was taken under the HiWish program.

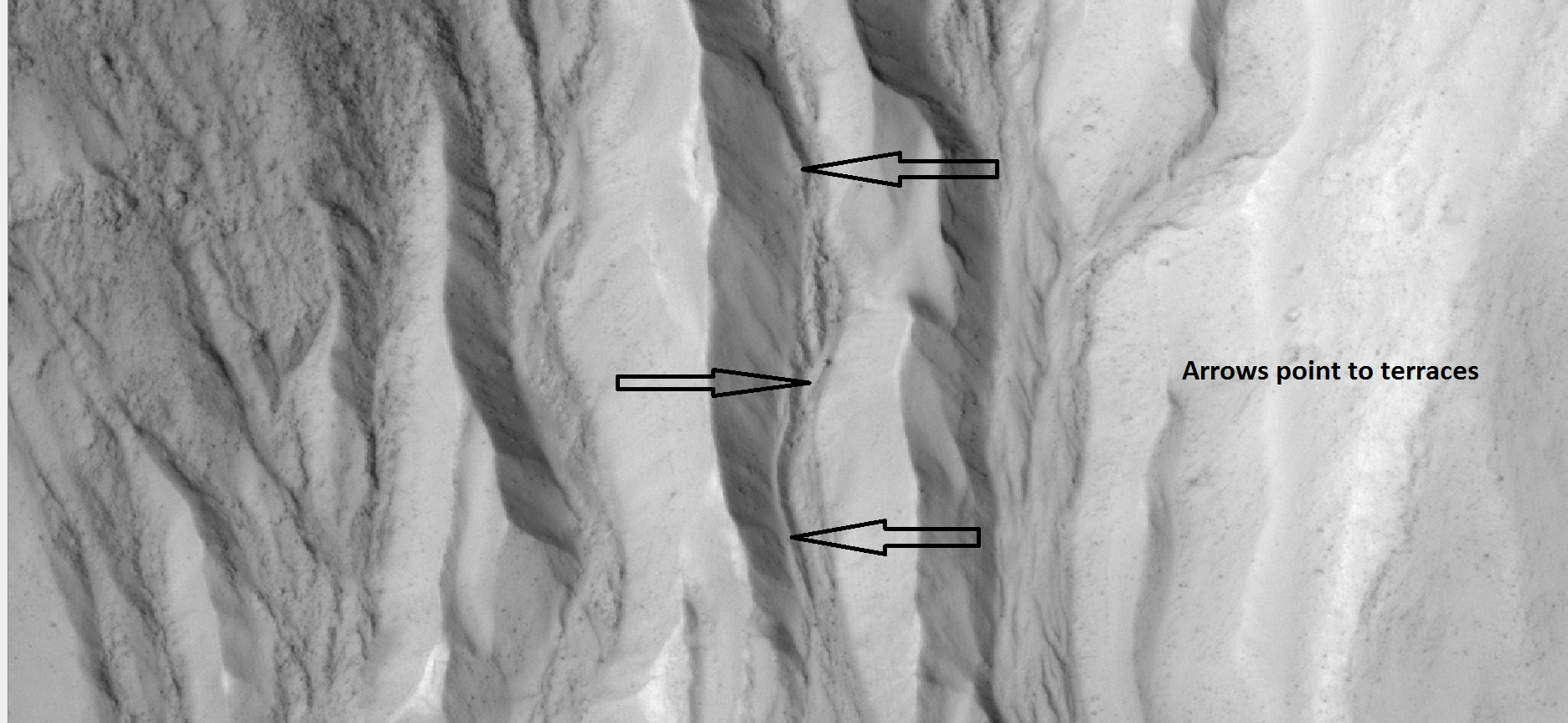
This enlargement of a small part of the previous image shows terraces along a gully channel. The terraces were created when a new channel cut through the old surface. This means that the gully was not in a single event. Water must have flowed more than once in this location.

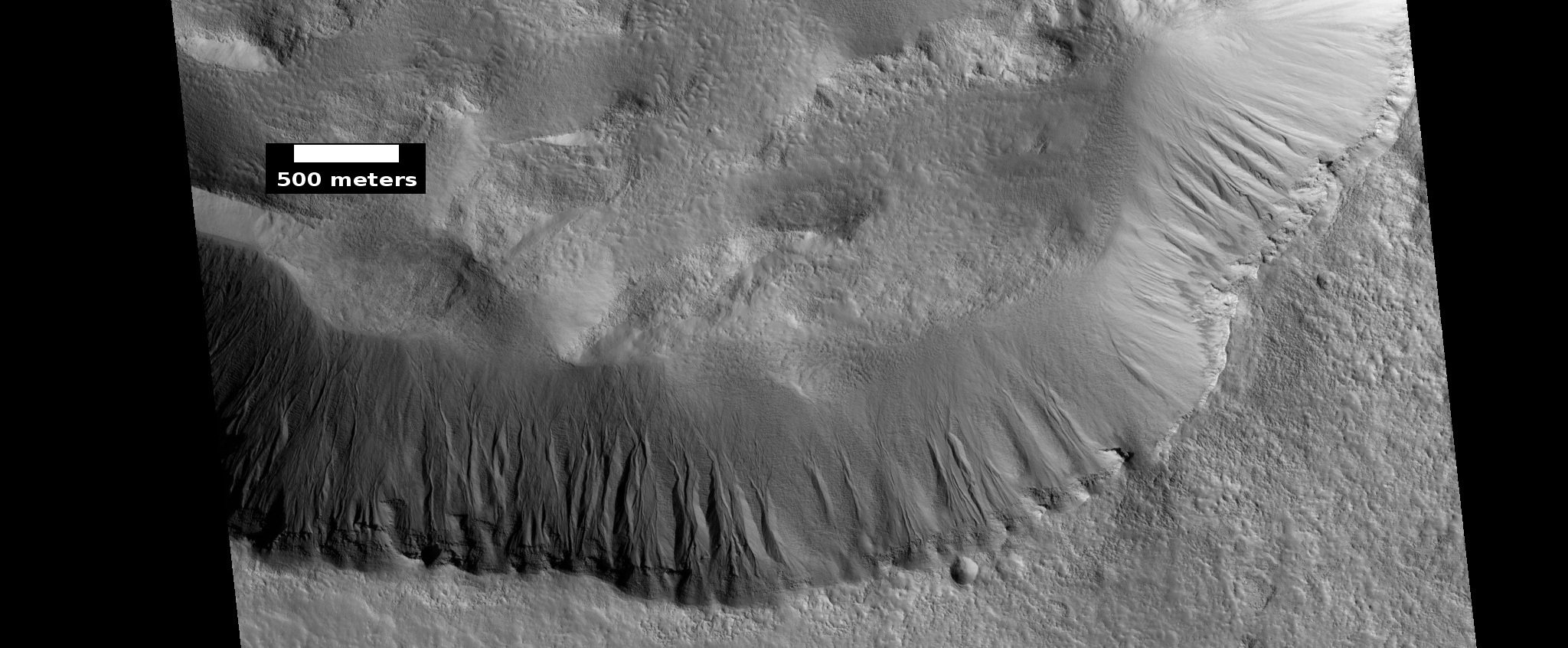
Gullies in a crater. Some seem to be young, others are well developed. Picture was taken by HiRISE under the HiWish program.

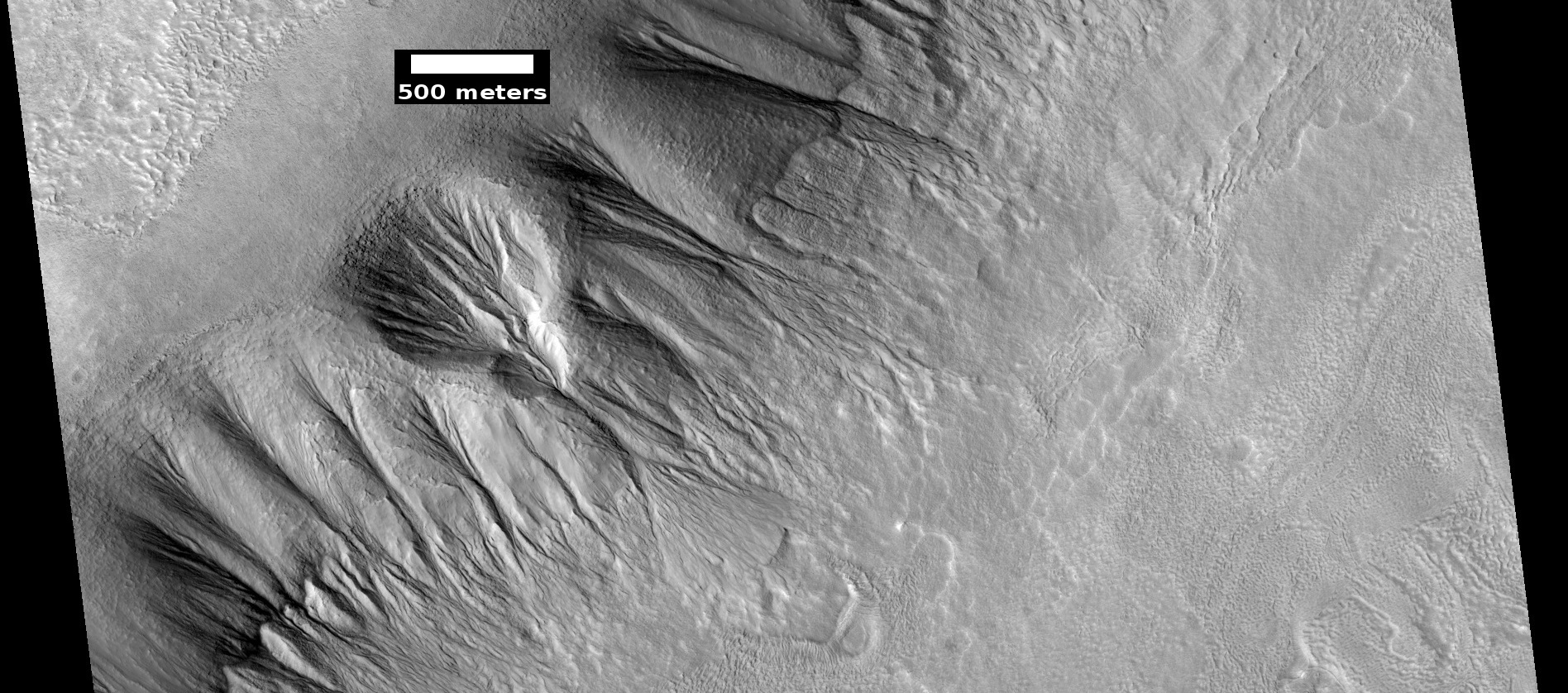
Gullies along mesa wall in North Tempe Terra, as seen by HiRISE under HiWish program

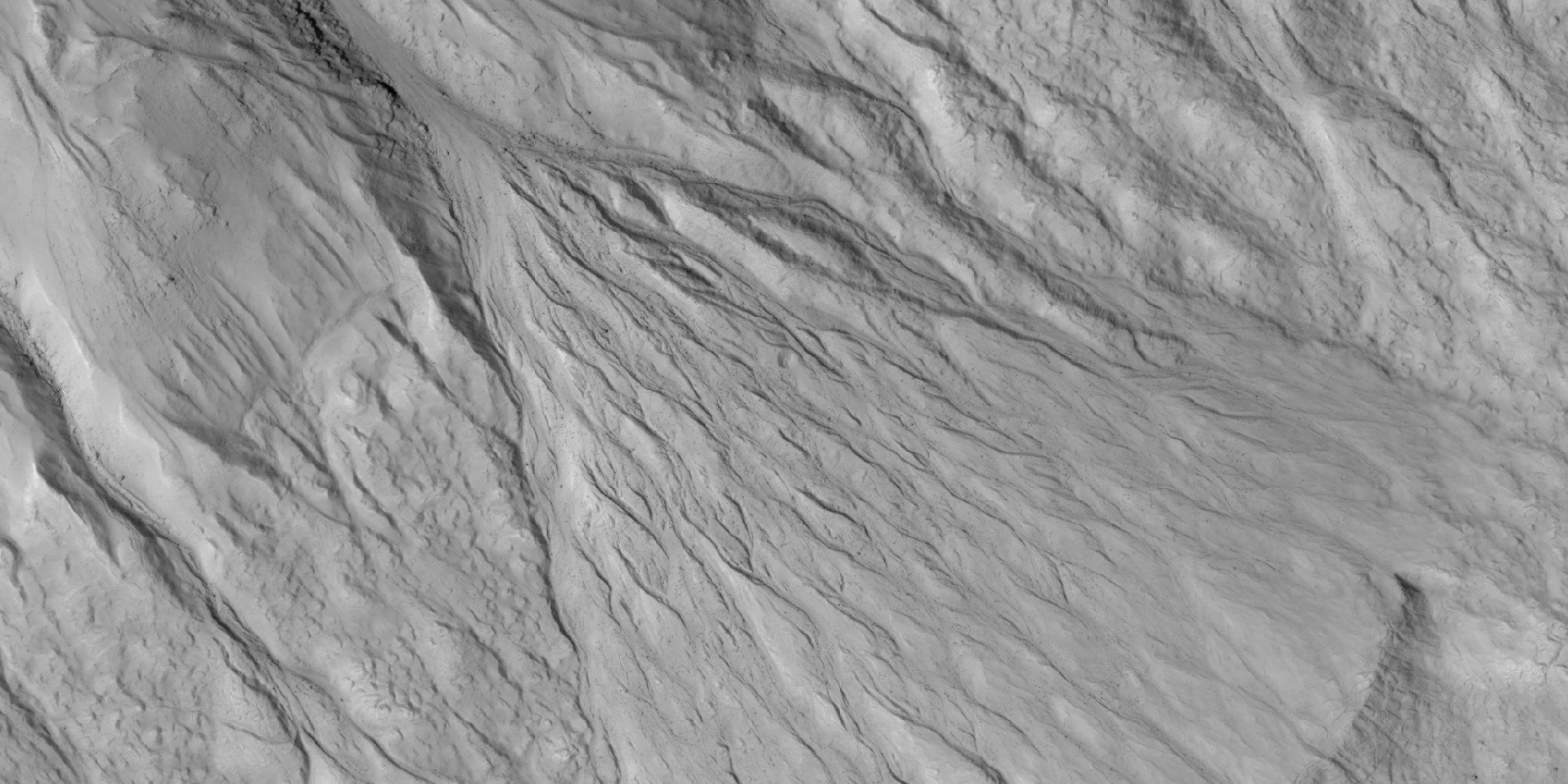
Close view of gully apron, as seen by HiRISE under HiWish program Note this is an enlargement of the previous image.

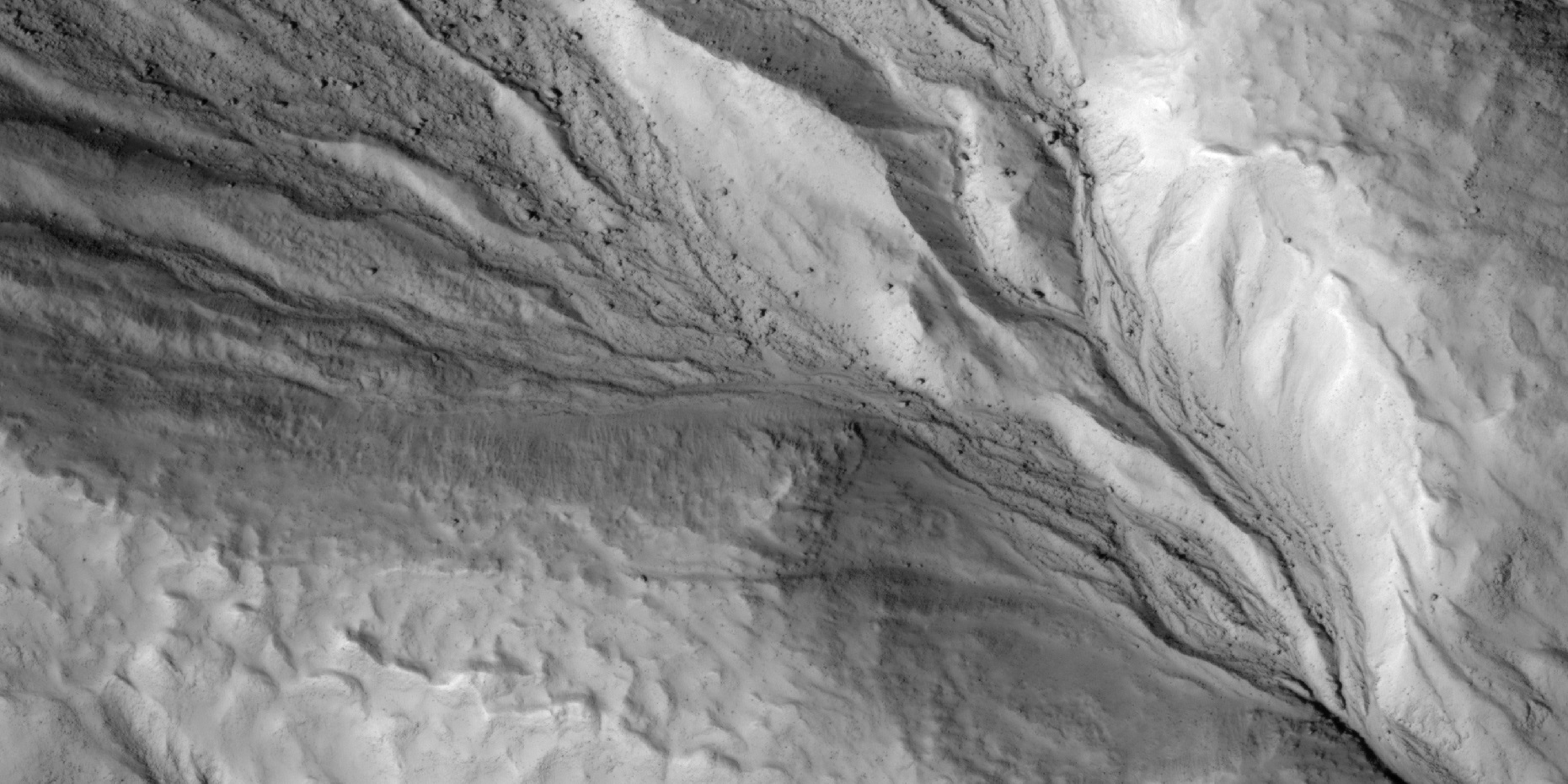
Close view of gully alcove, as seen by HiRISE under HiWish program Note this is an enlargement of a previous image.

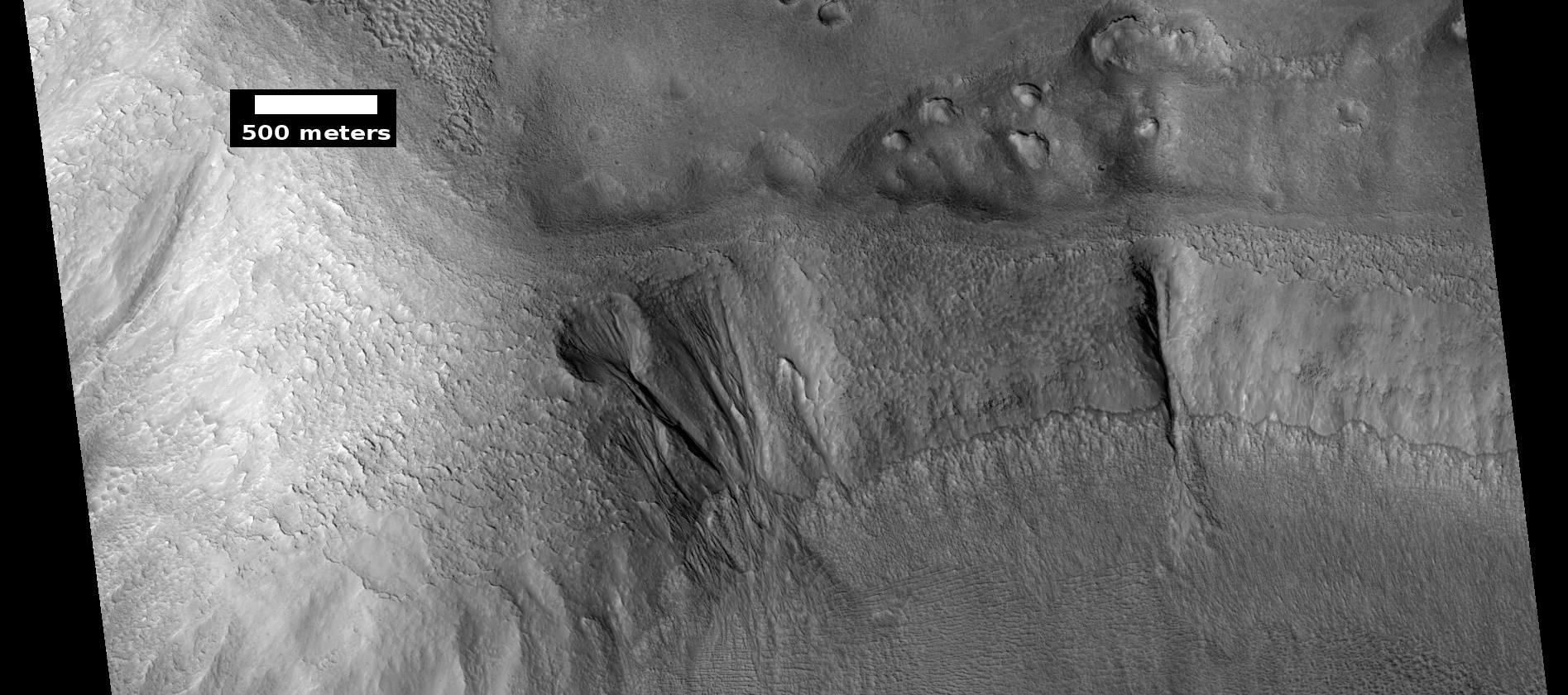
Gullies on wall of mesa, as seen by HiRISE under HiWish program

Diacria quadrangle gullies

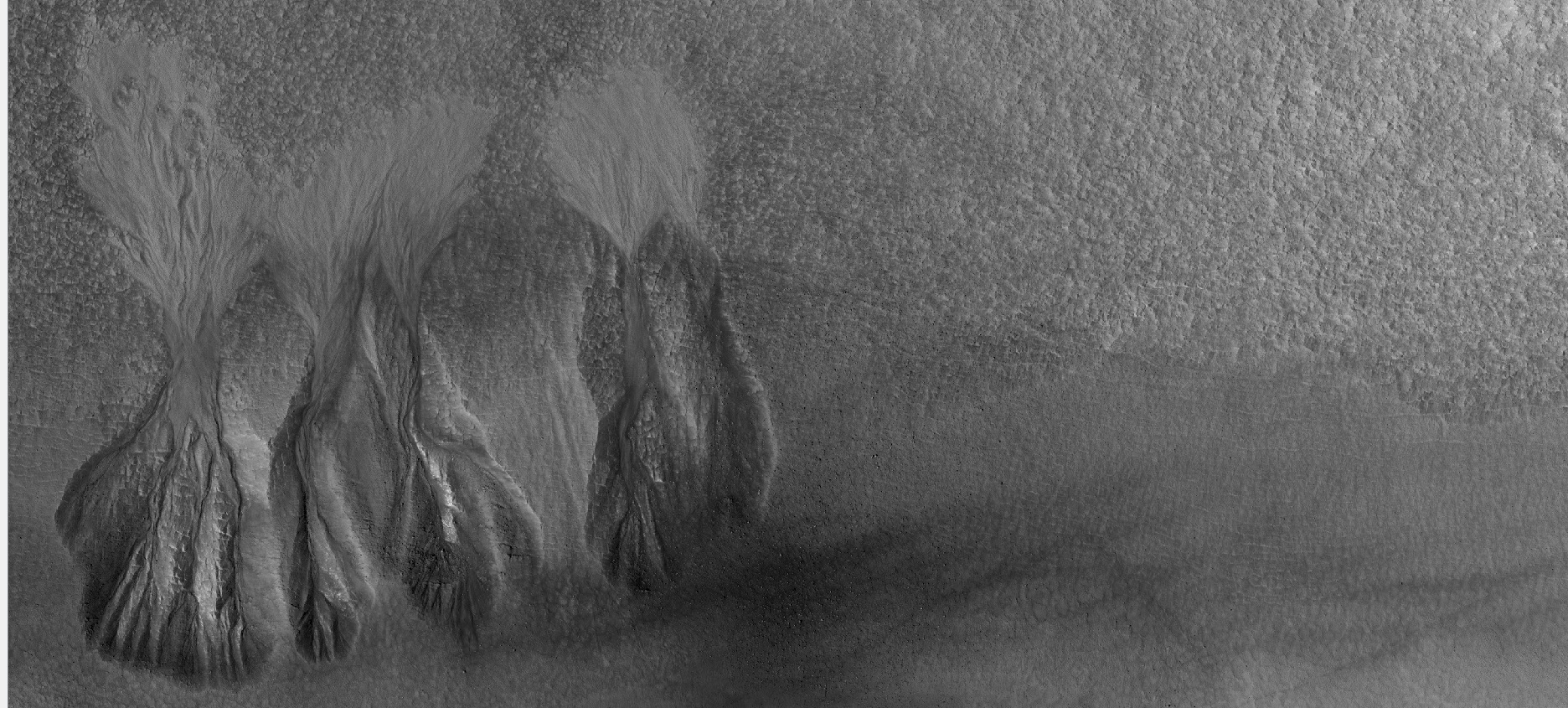
Wide view of group of gullies, as seen by HiRISE under HiWish program. Note that part of this image is enlarged in the following image.

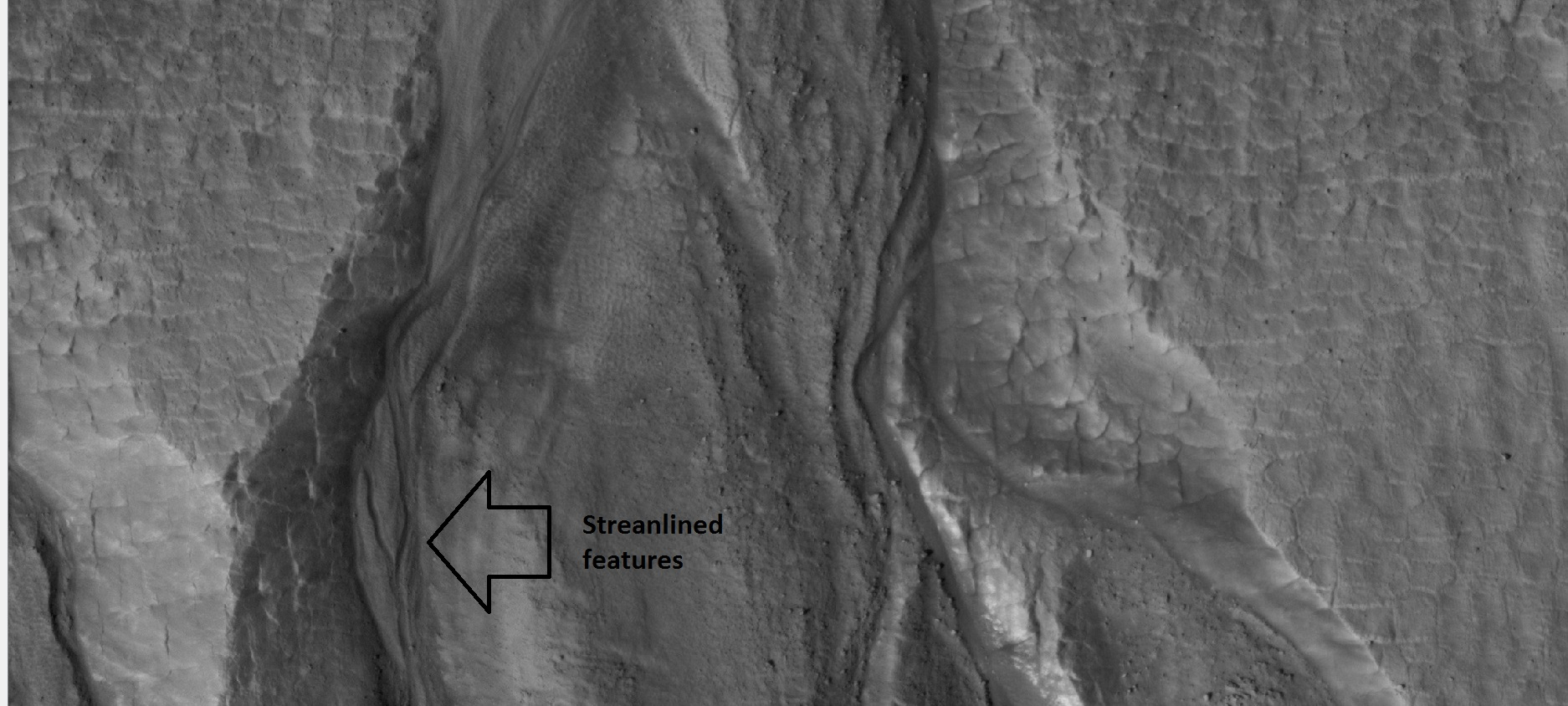
Close-up of gullies, as seen by HiRISE under HiWish program.

Noachis quadrangle gullies

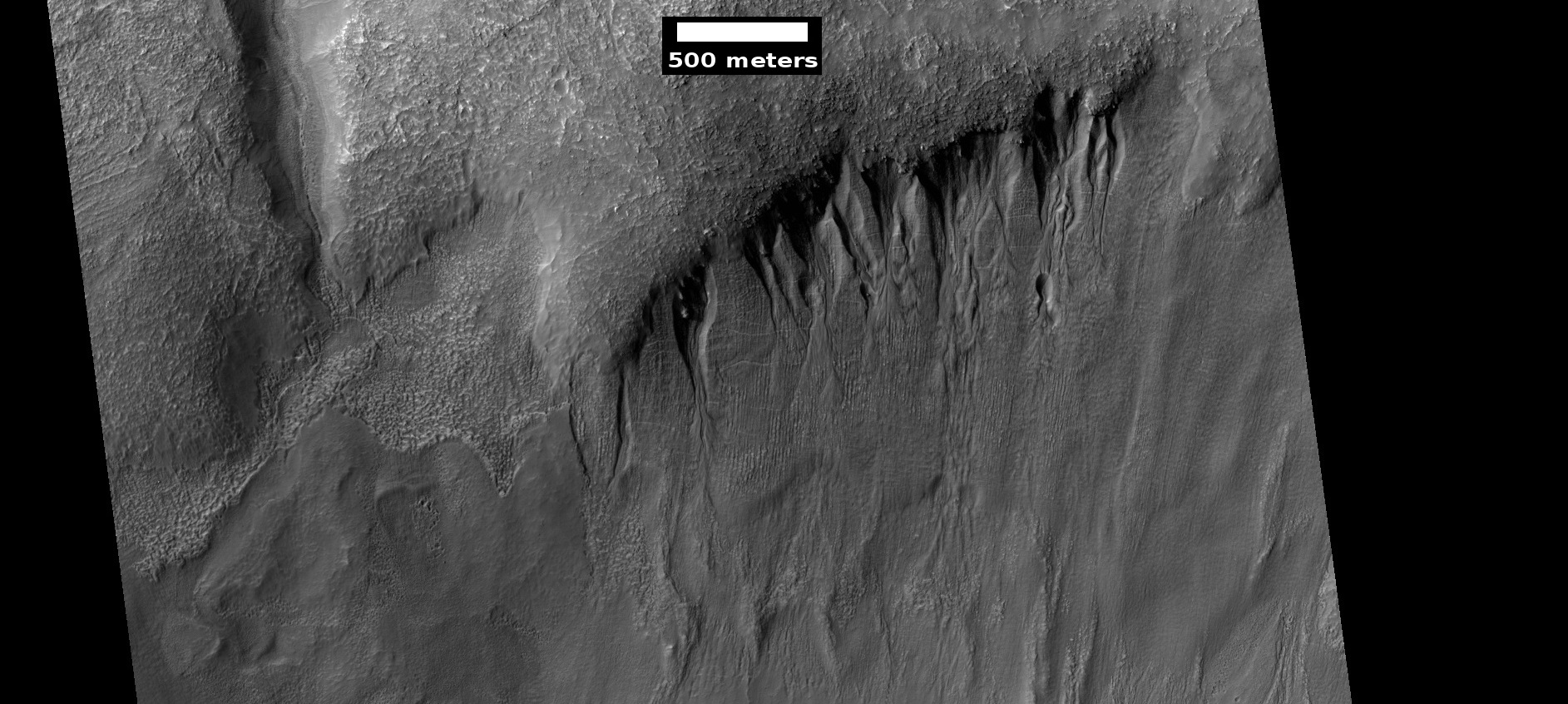
Gullies on the wall of a crater, as seen by HiRISE under HiWish program

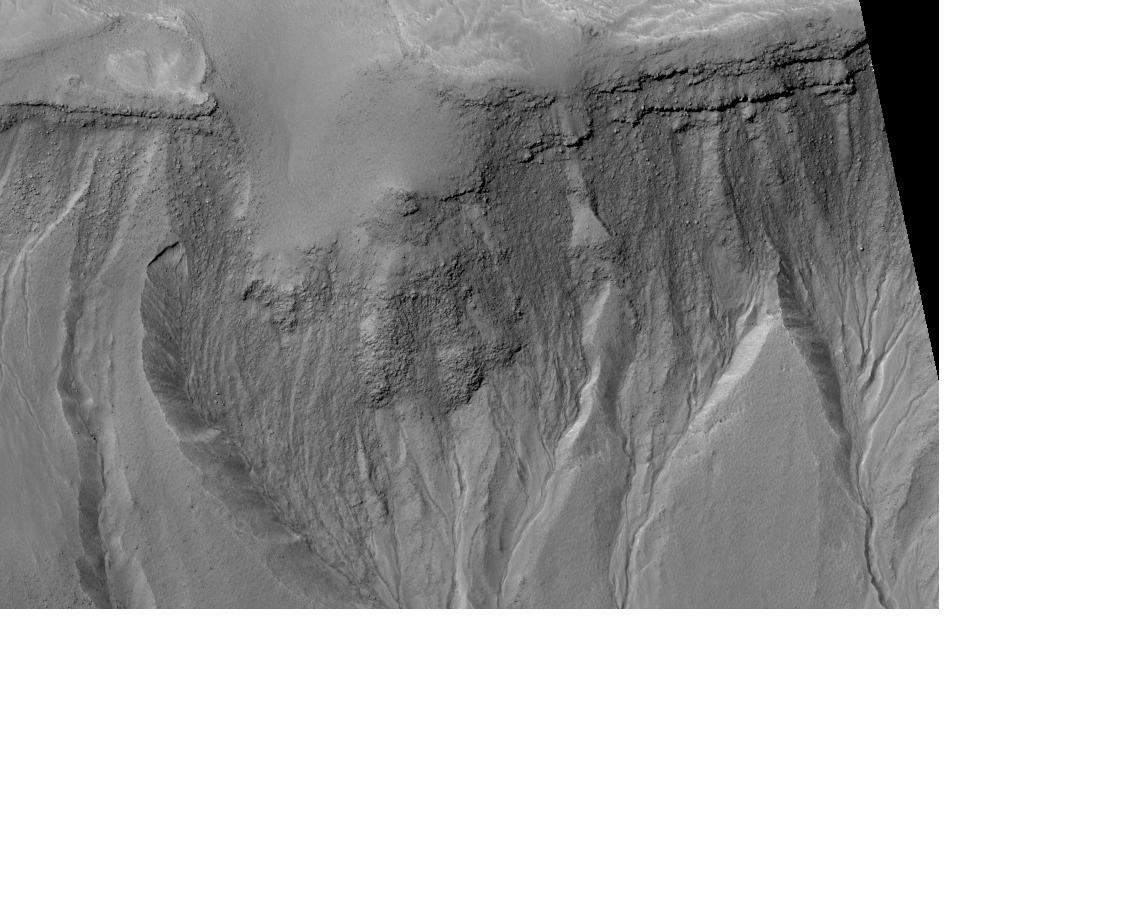
Gullies on mound in Asimov Crater, as seen by HiRISE.

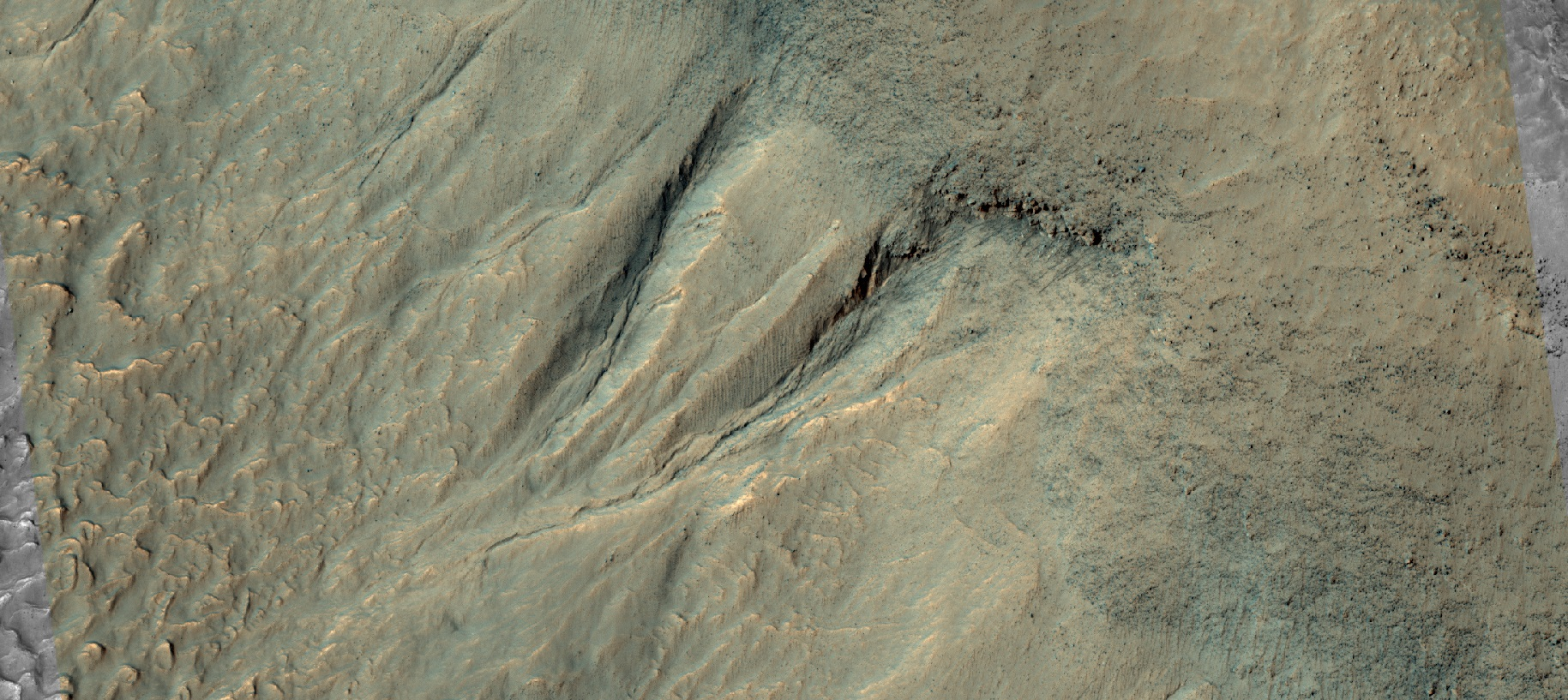
Gullies in crater, as seen by HiRISE under HiWish program
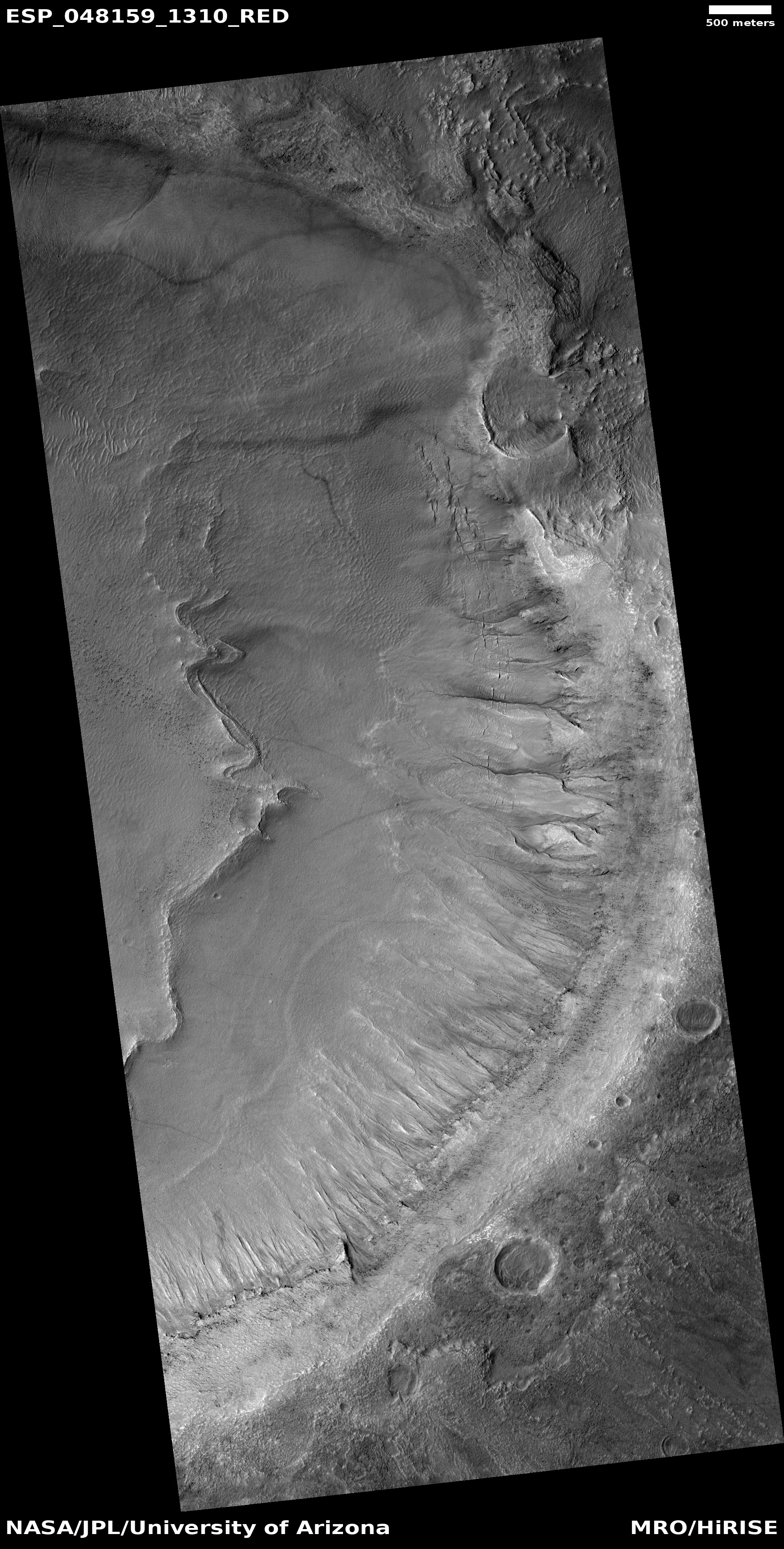
Wide view of gullies and ridges in crater, as seen by HiRISE under HiWish program

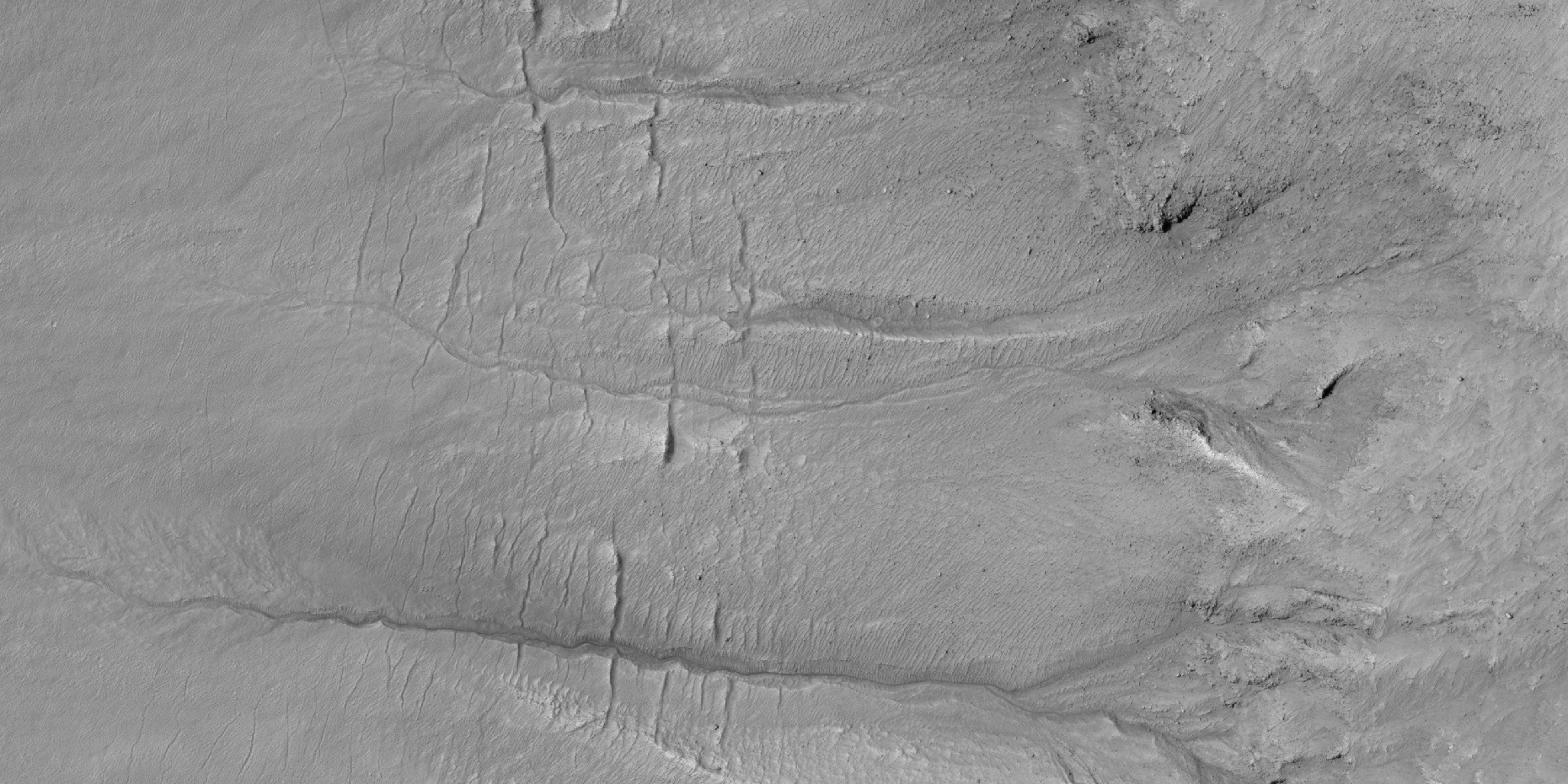
Close view of gully channels, as seen by HiRISE under HiWish program Channels make some tight curves.

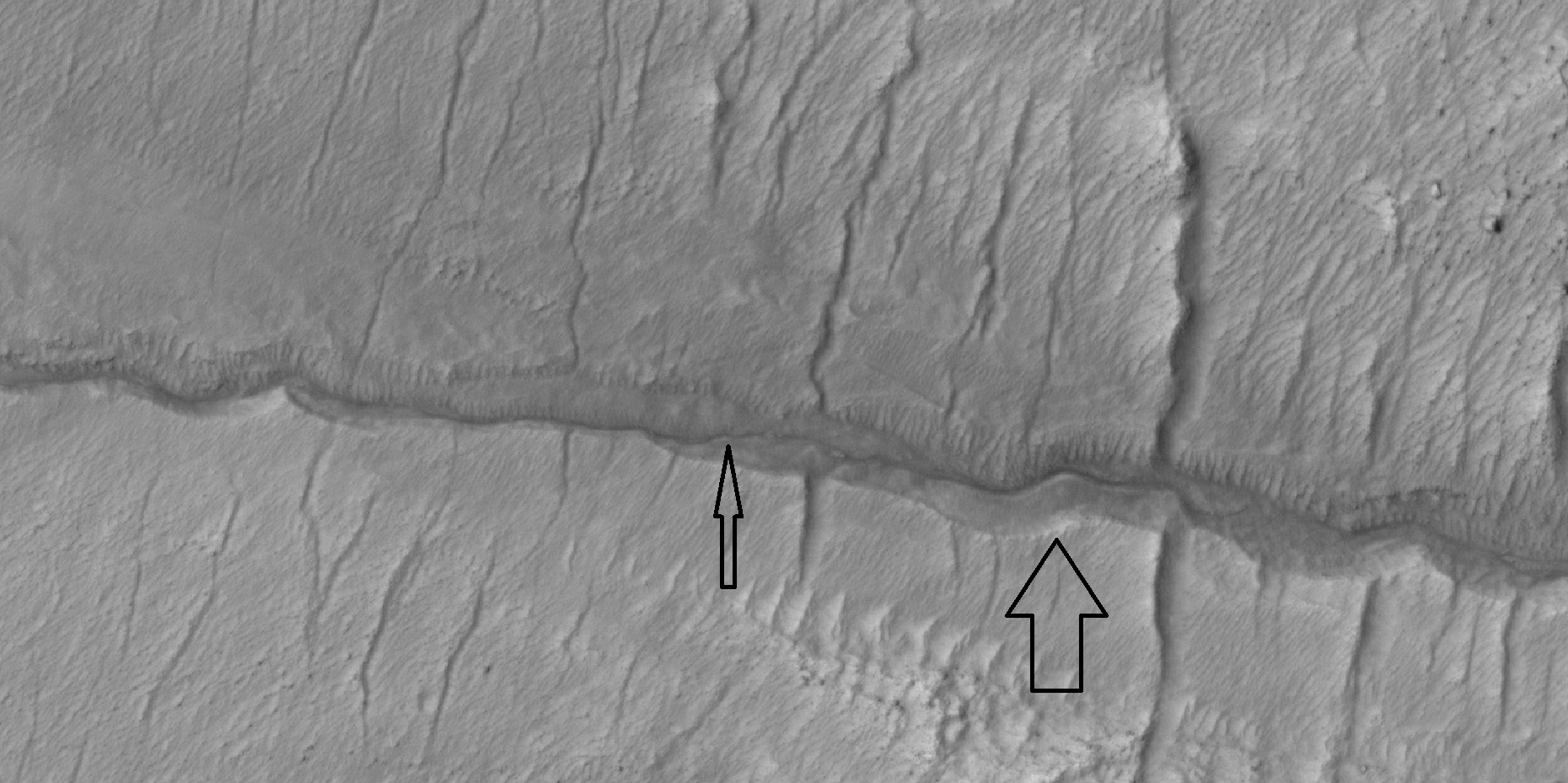
Close view of gully channels, as seen by HiRISE under HiWish program Arrows point to small channel within larger channels.

Casius quadrangle gullies

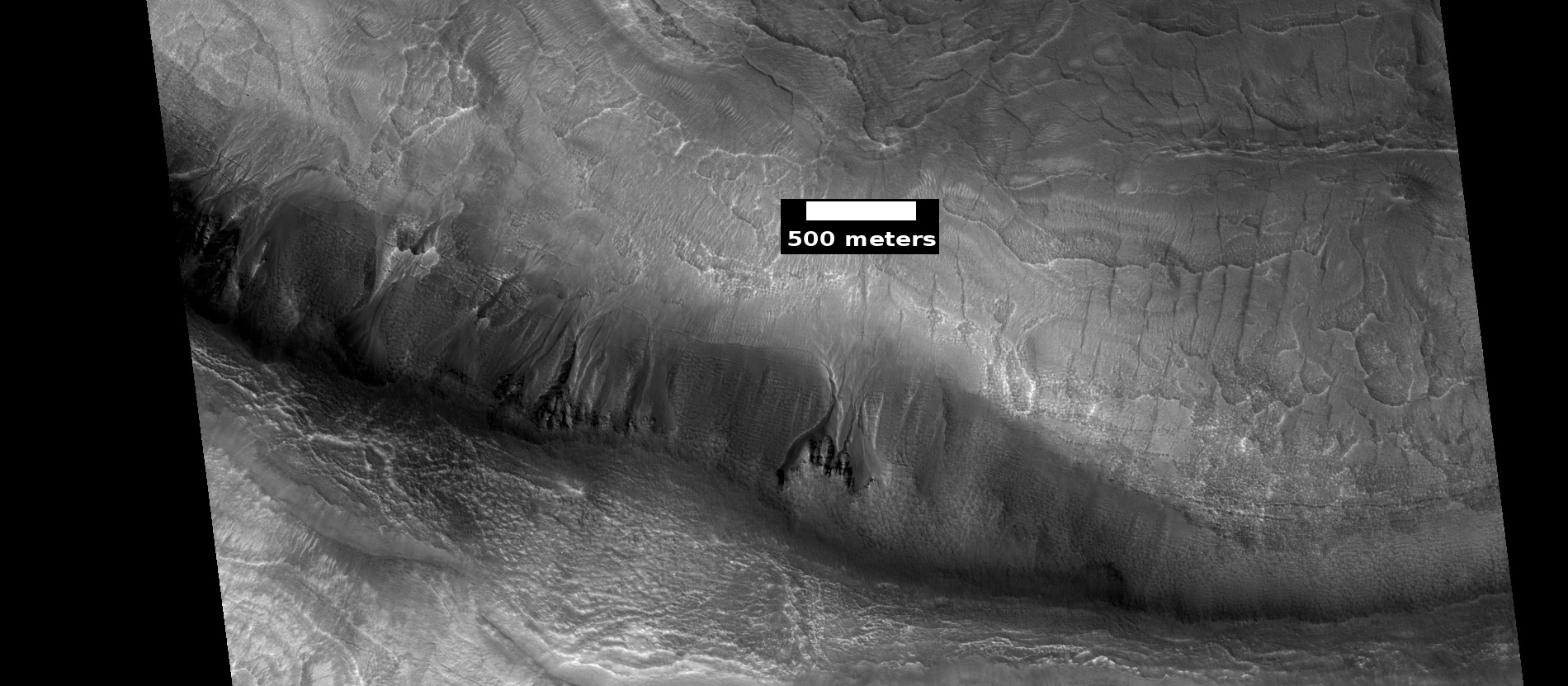
Gullies in crater, as seen by HiRISE under HiWish program

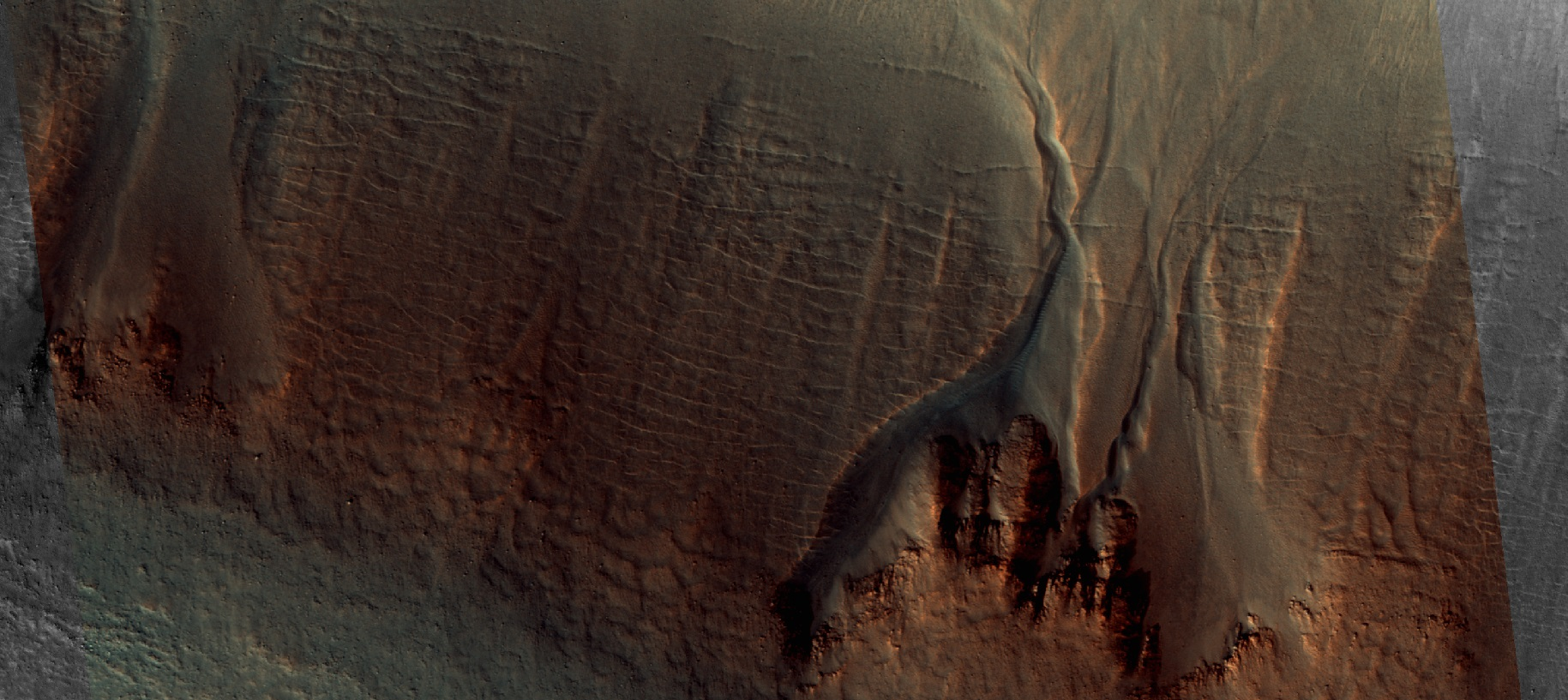
Close view of gully in crater, as seen by HiRISE

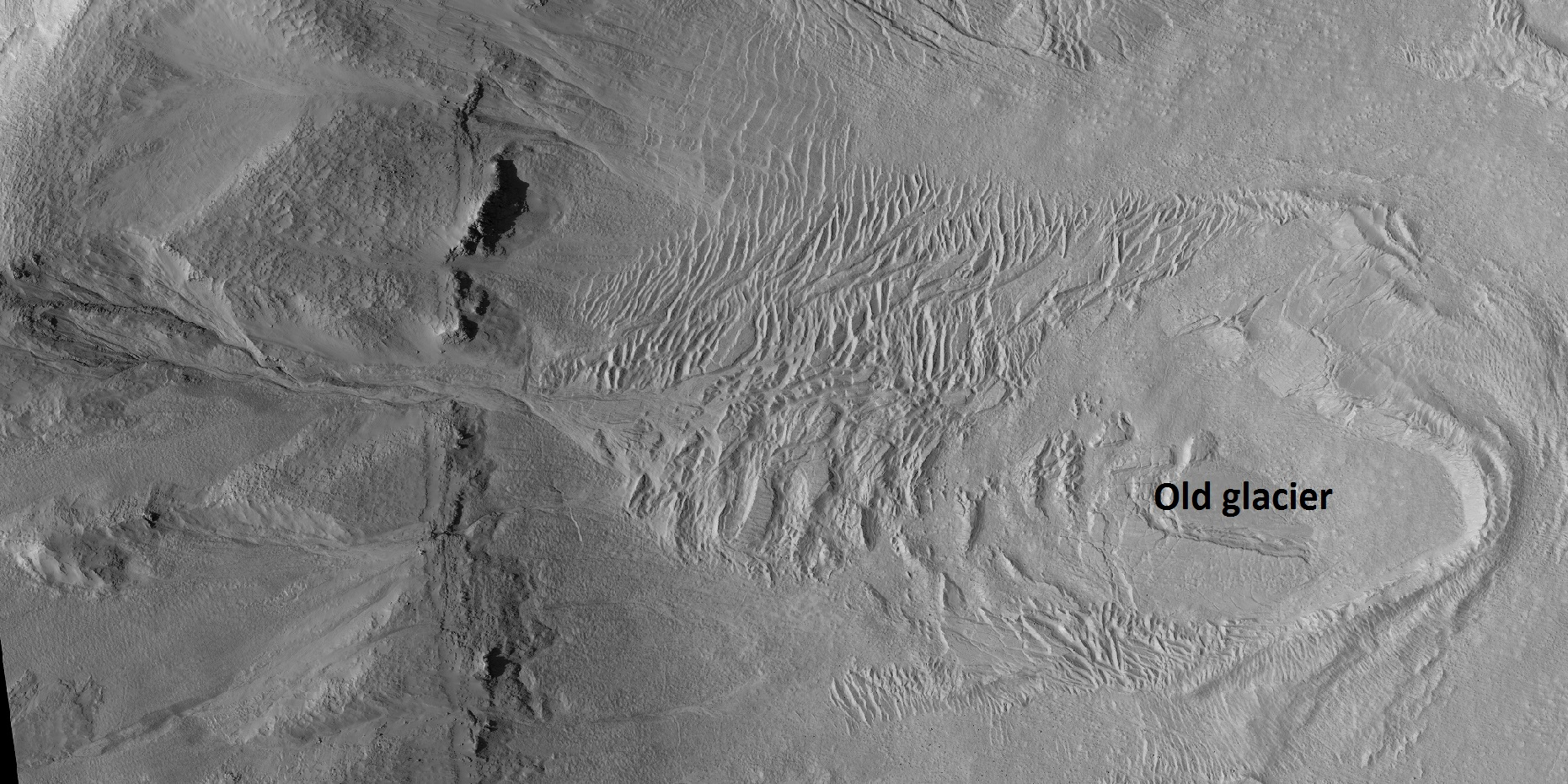
Glacier and gullies, as seen by HiRISE under HiWish program Some researchers suggest that gullies come after glaciers. Location is Casius quadrangle.

Ismenius Lacus quadrangle gullies

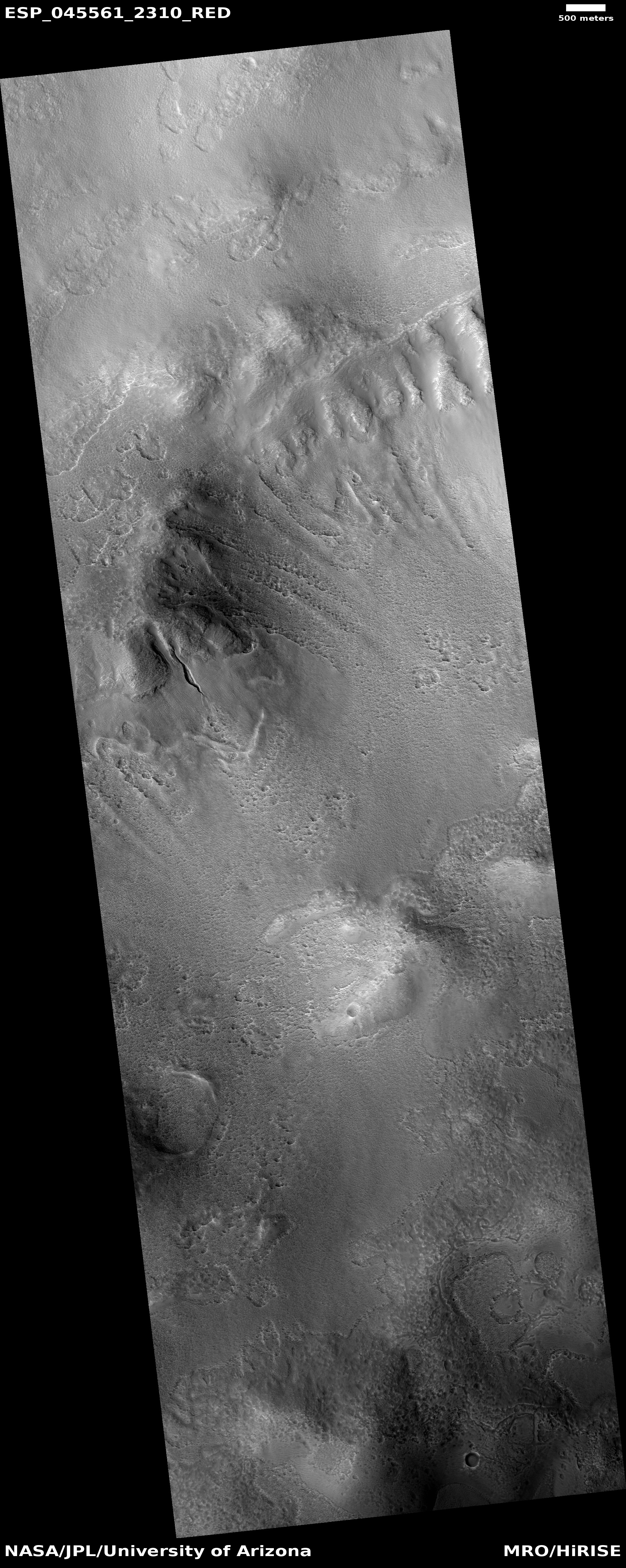
Wide view of a gully on a steep slope, as seen by HiRISE under HiWish program

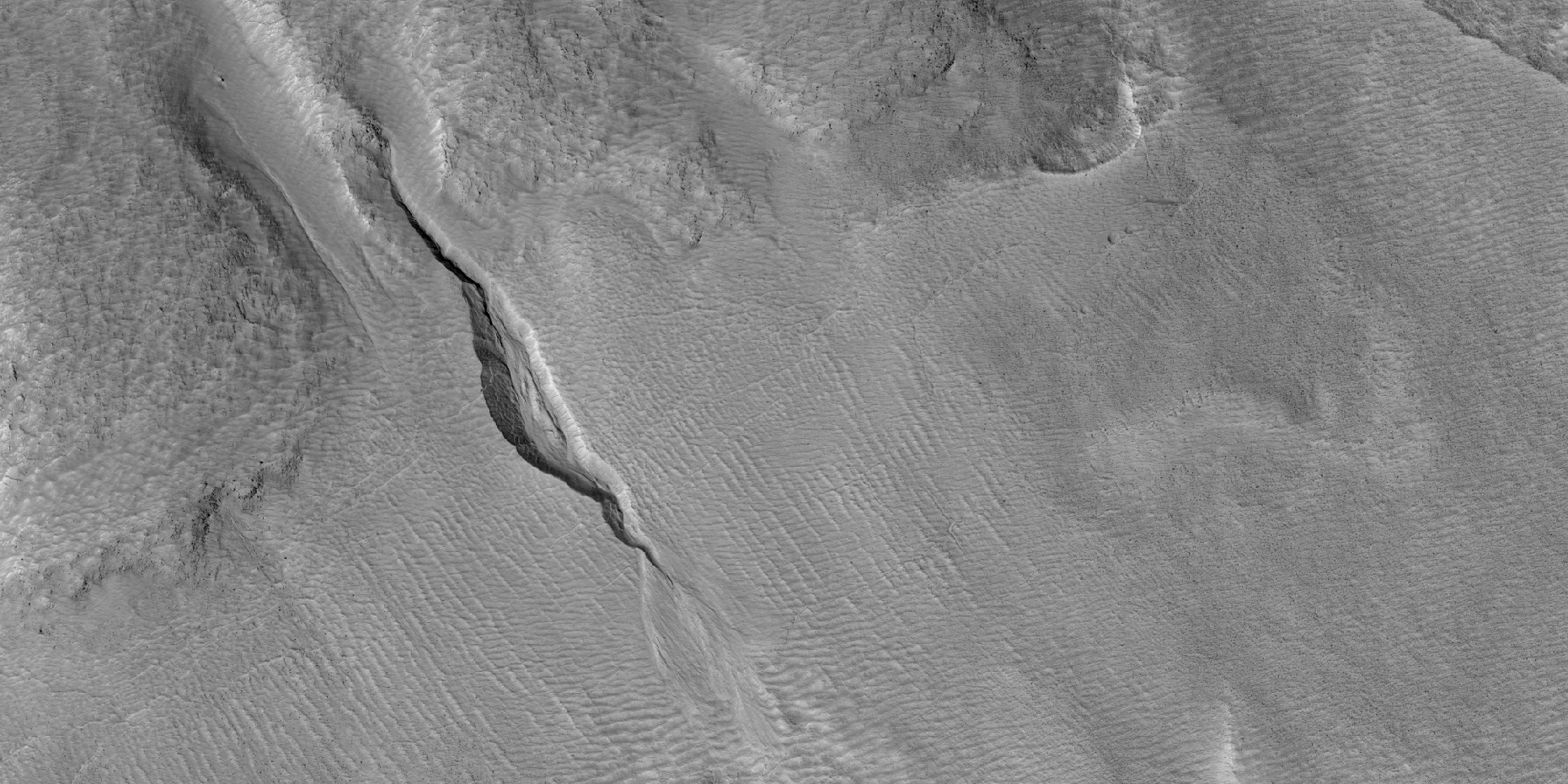
Closer view of previous image of a gully, as seen by HiRISE under HiWish program

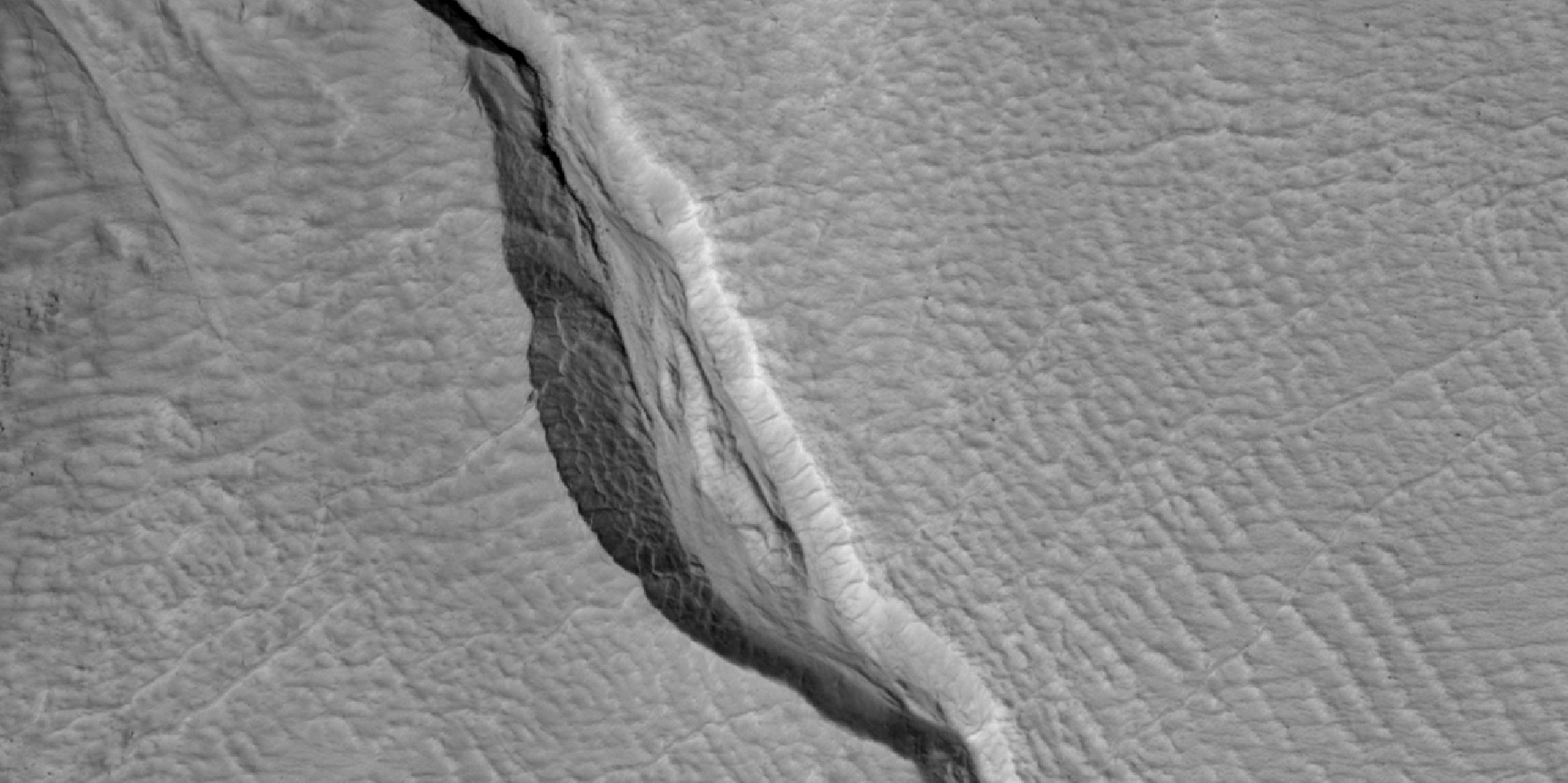
Close view of channel in gully showing streamlined forms, as seen by HiRISE under HiWish program
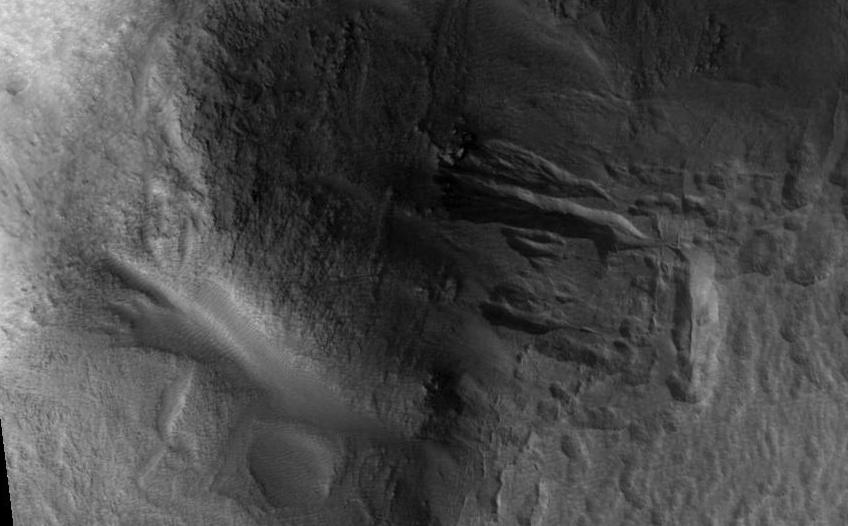
Lyot Crater Gullies, as seen by HiRISE.

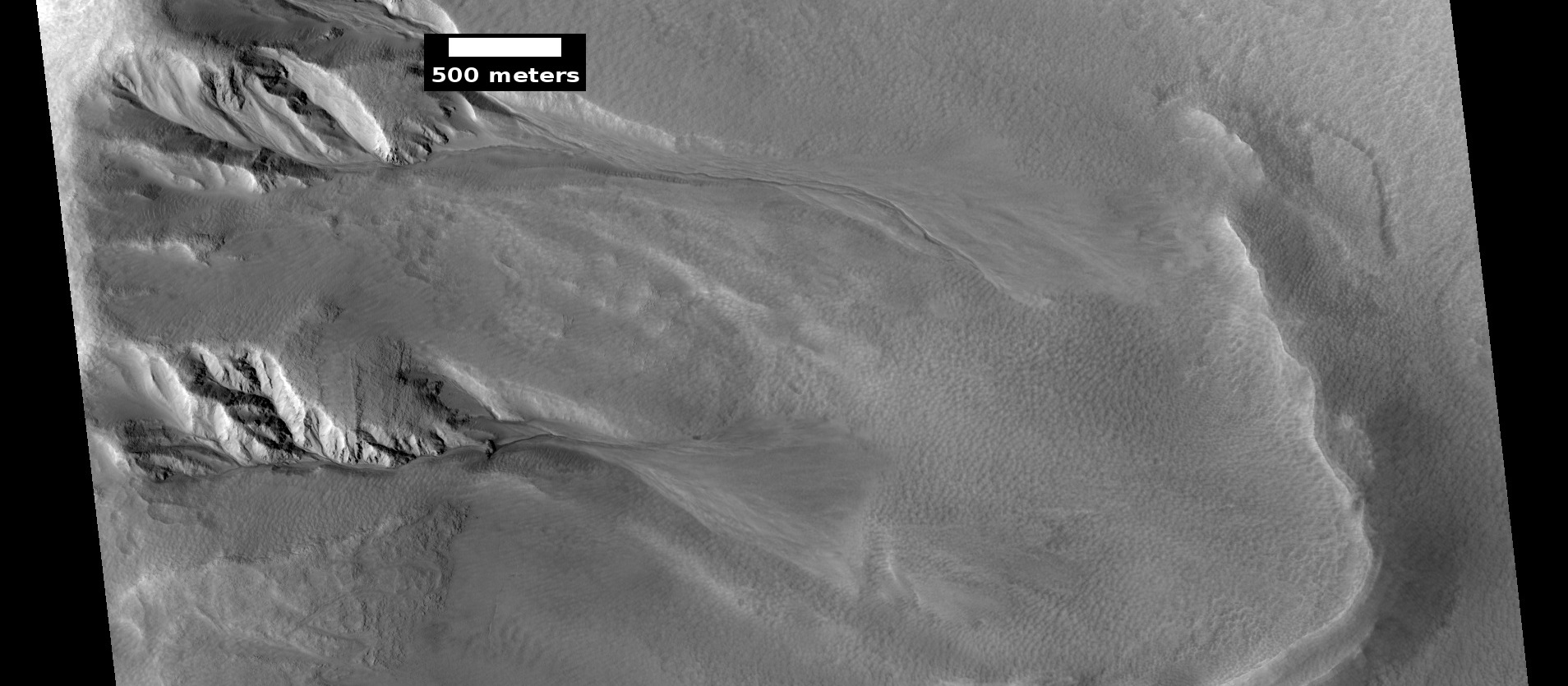
Gullies in crater, as seen by HiRISE under HiWish program

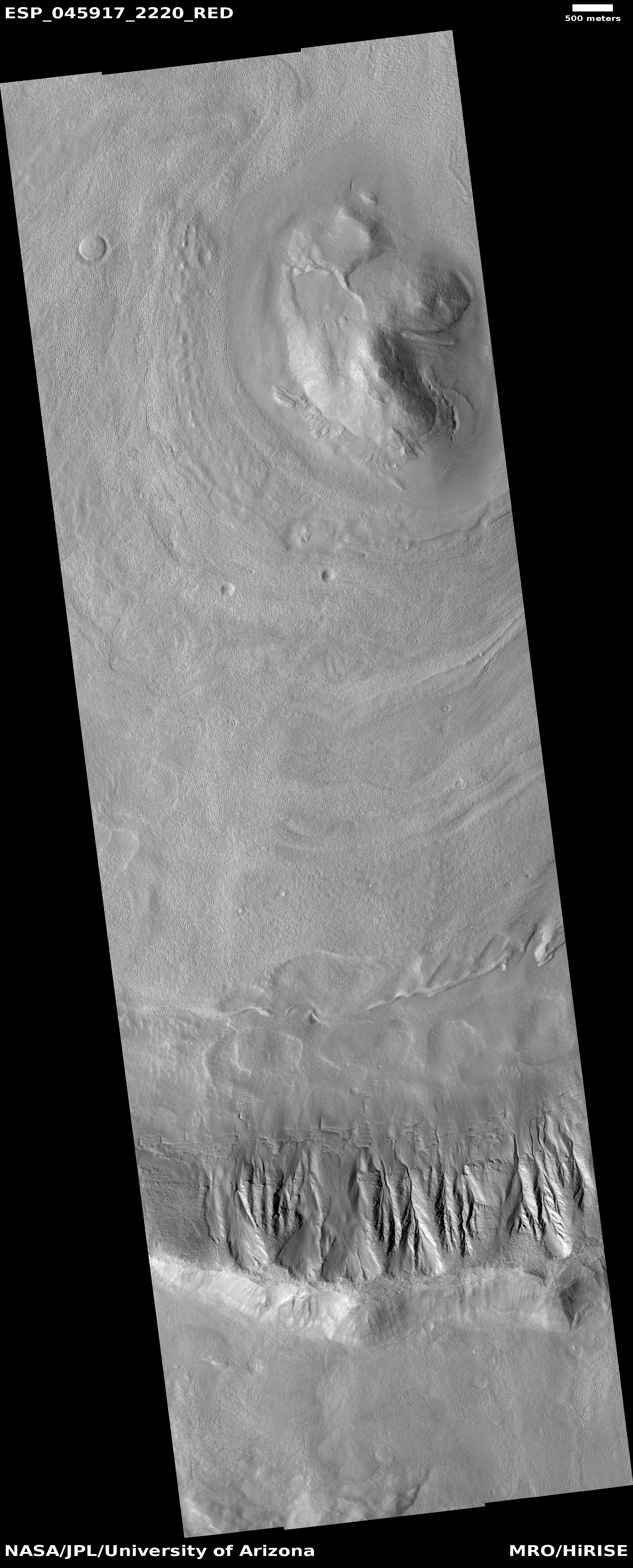
Gullies, as seen by HiRISE under HiWish program

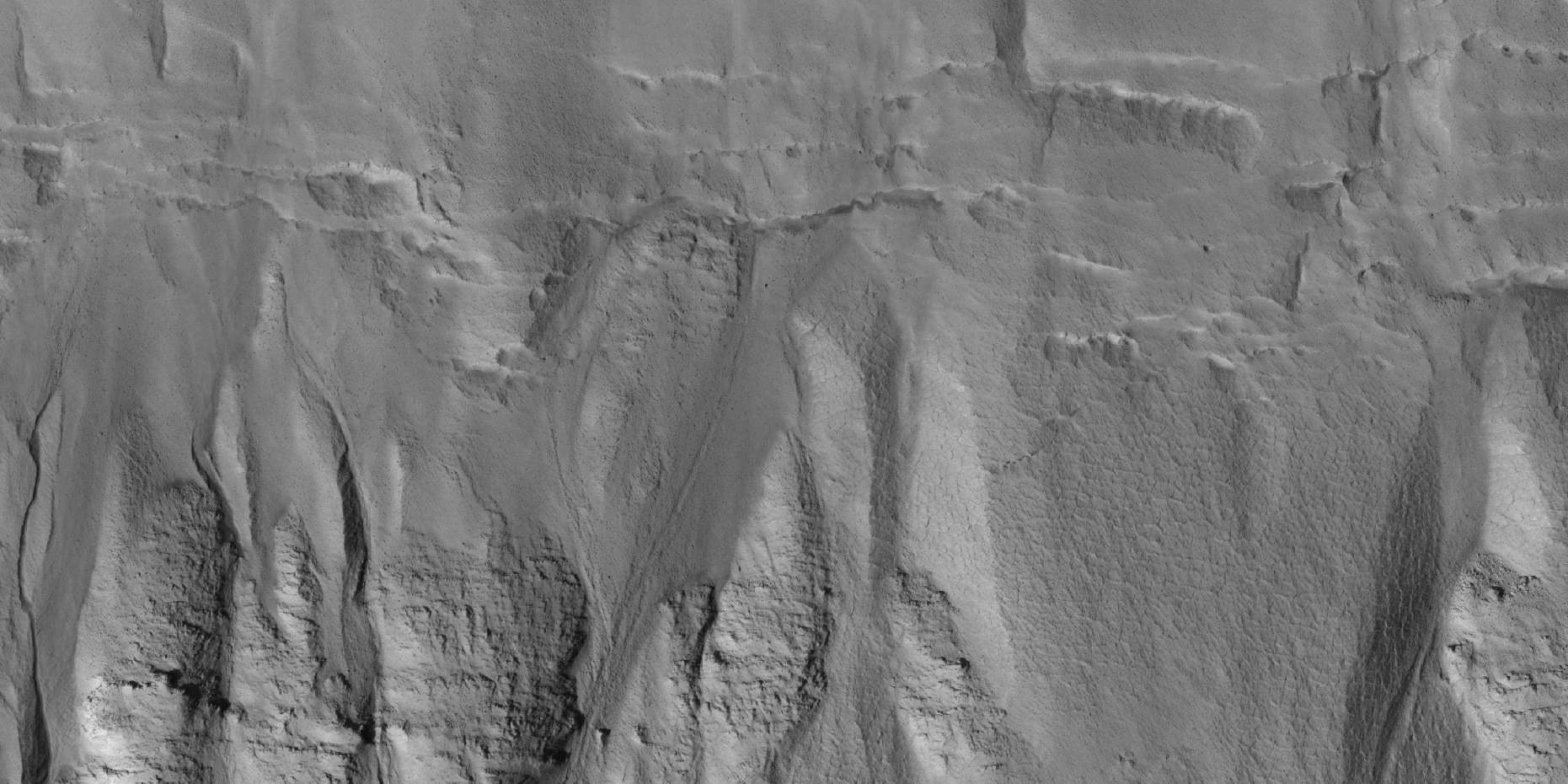
Close view of gullies, as seen by HiRISE under HiWish program

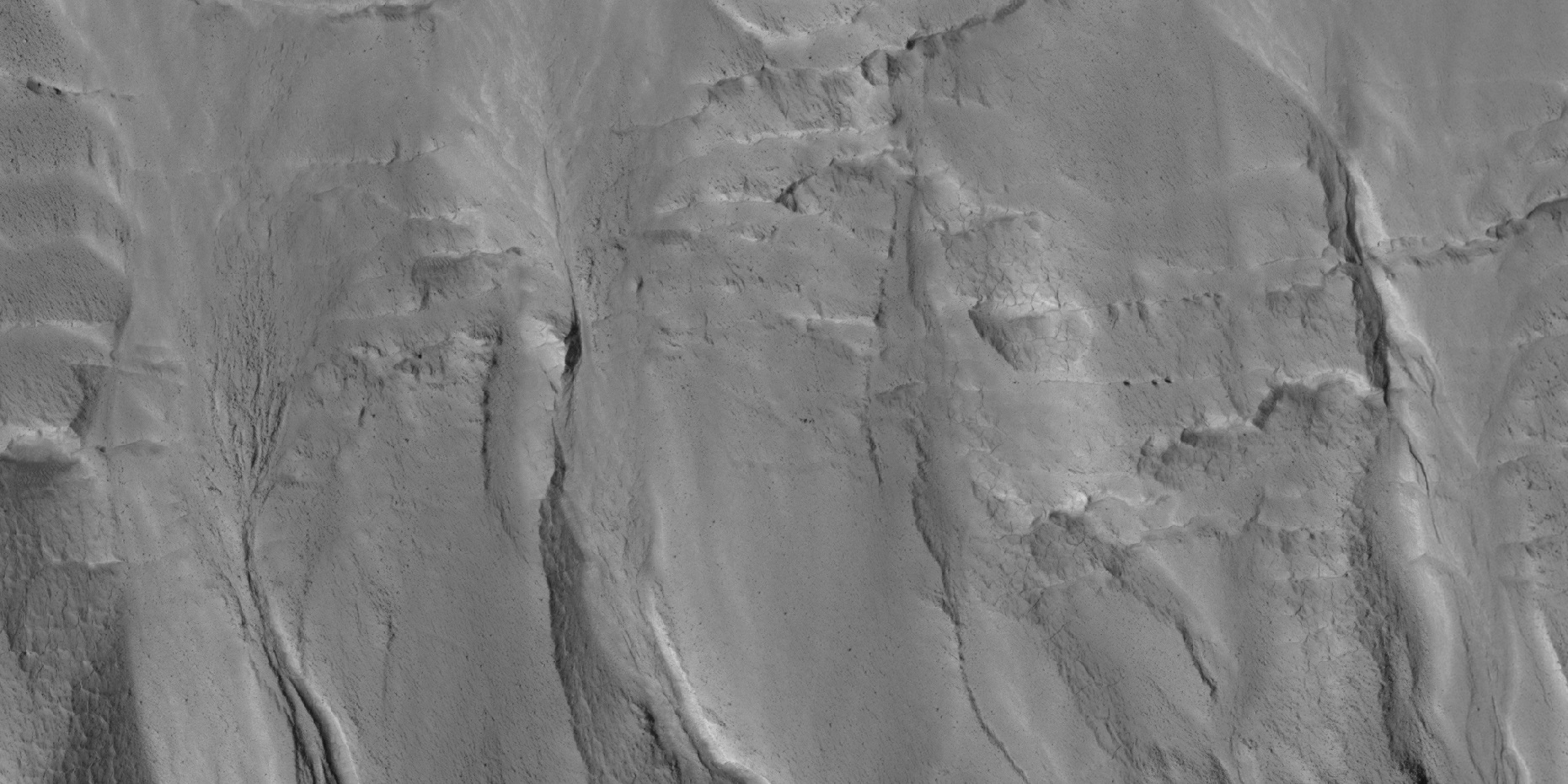
Close view of gullies, as seen by HiRISE under HiWish program

Iapygia quadrangle gullies

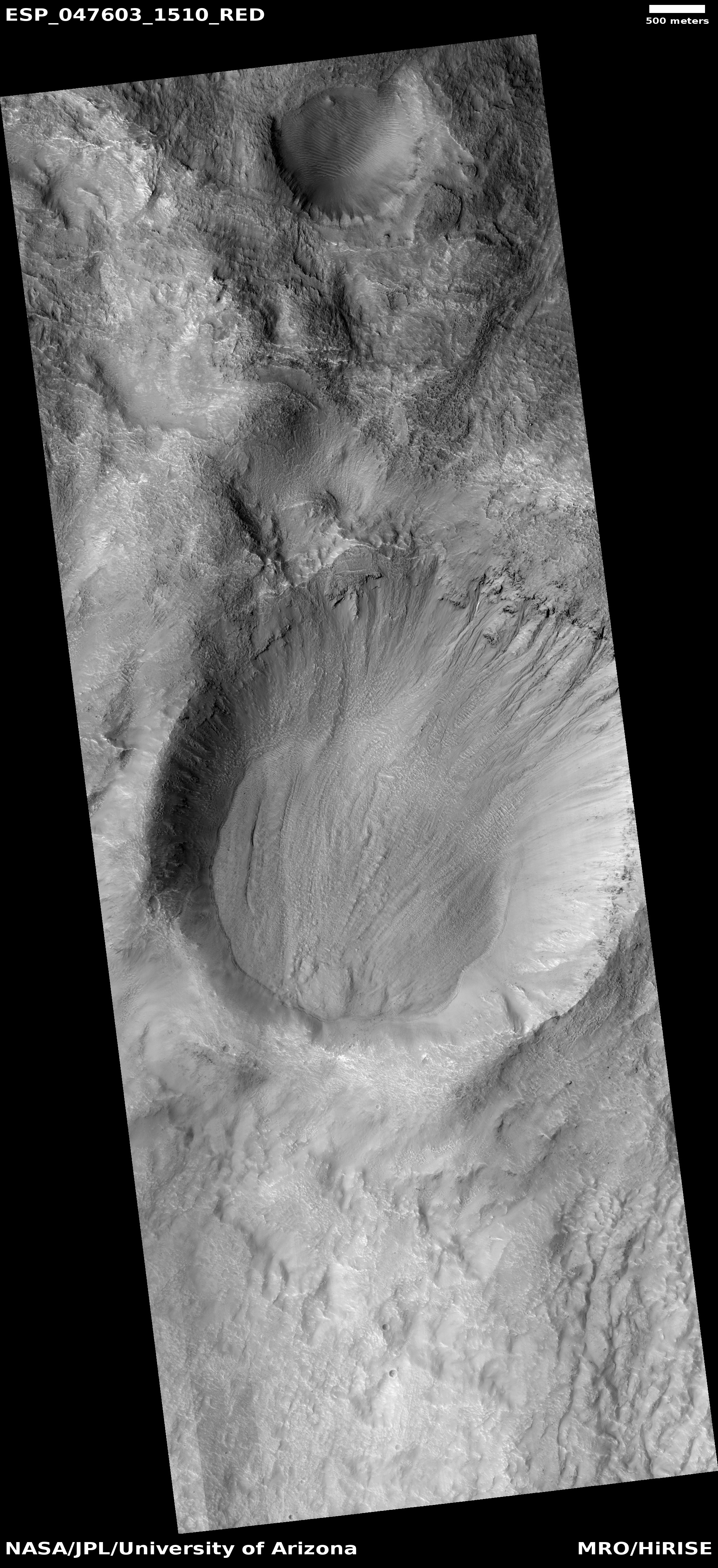
Gullies in crater, as seen by HiRISE under HiWish program

Hellas quadrangle gullies

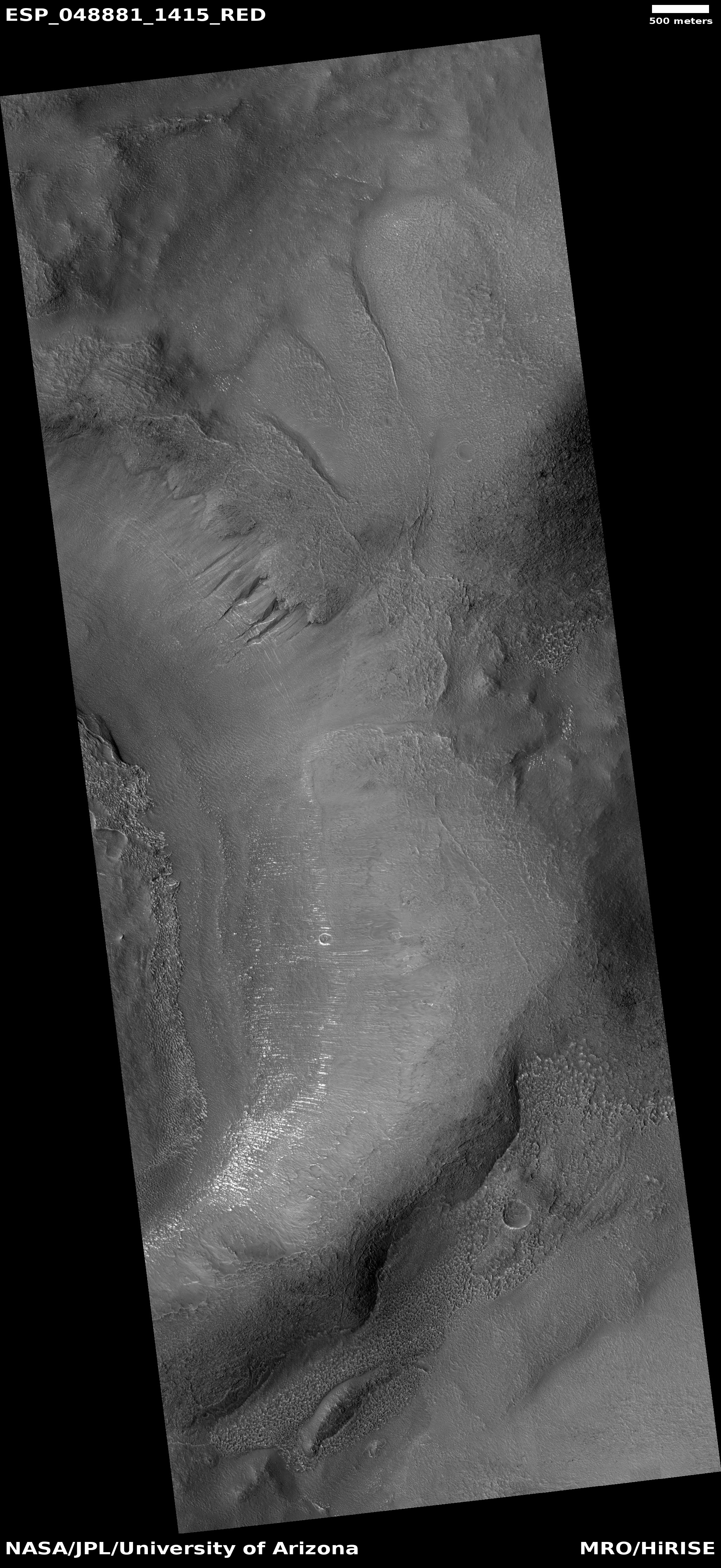
Gullies in crater, as seen by HiRISE under HiWish program

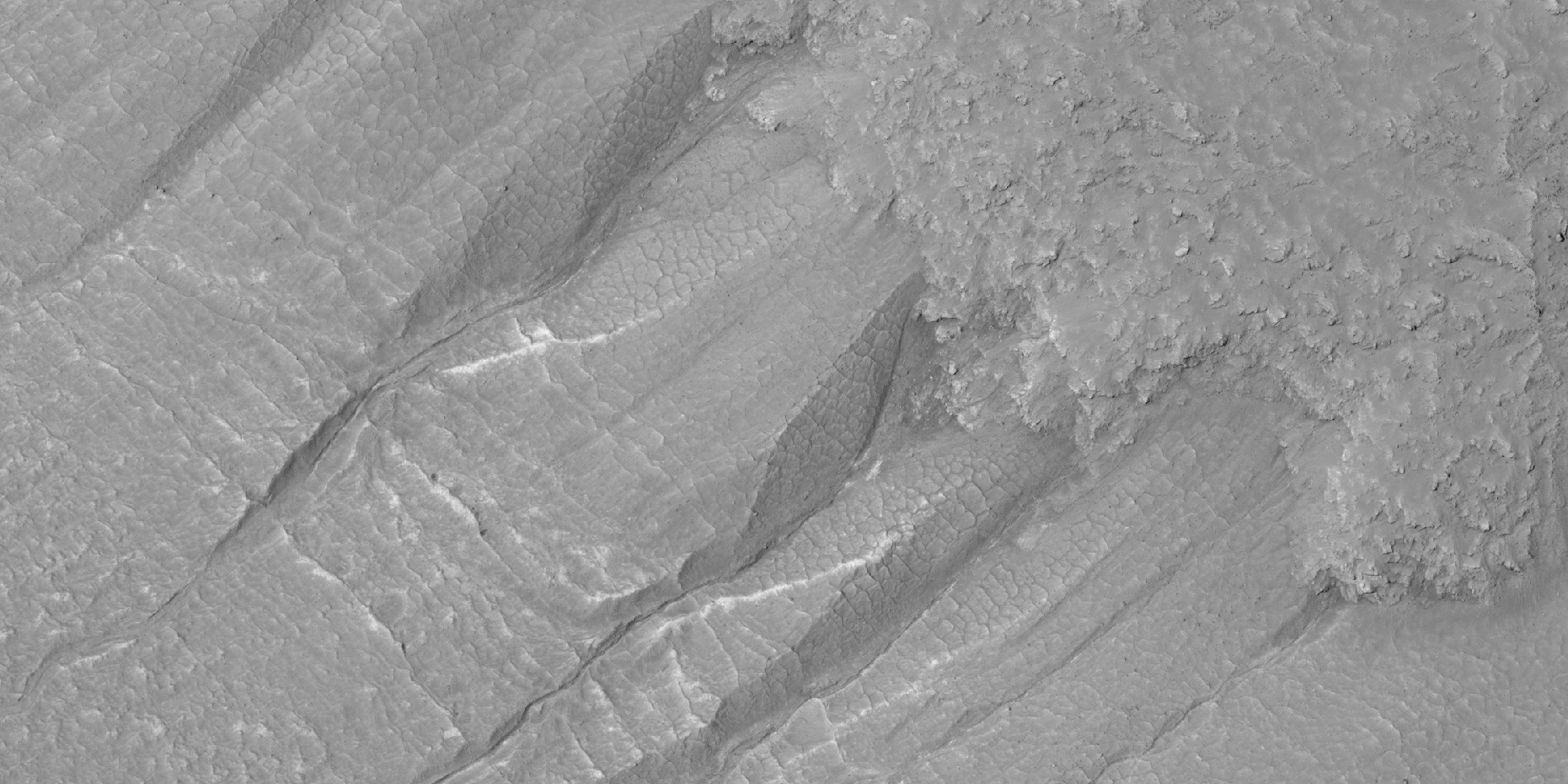
Close view of gullies in crater, as seen by HiRISE under HiWish program Polygons are visible in this close view.

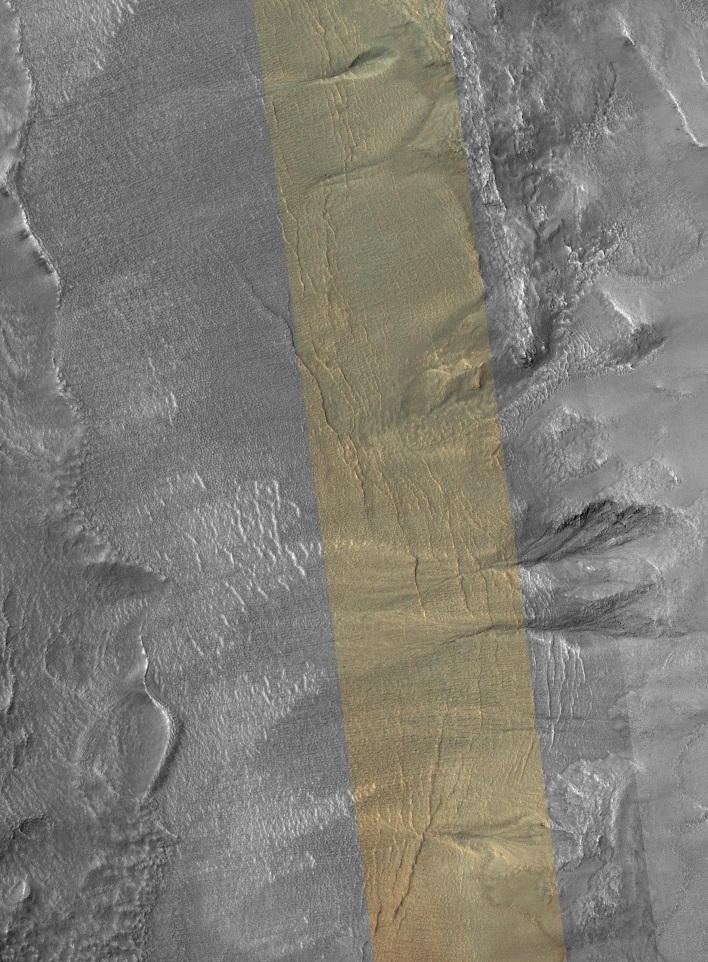
Gullies, as seen by HiRISE. The gullies range from very samll to large, as such they may represent different stages in the formation of gullies. The colored strip is about 1 km wide.

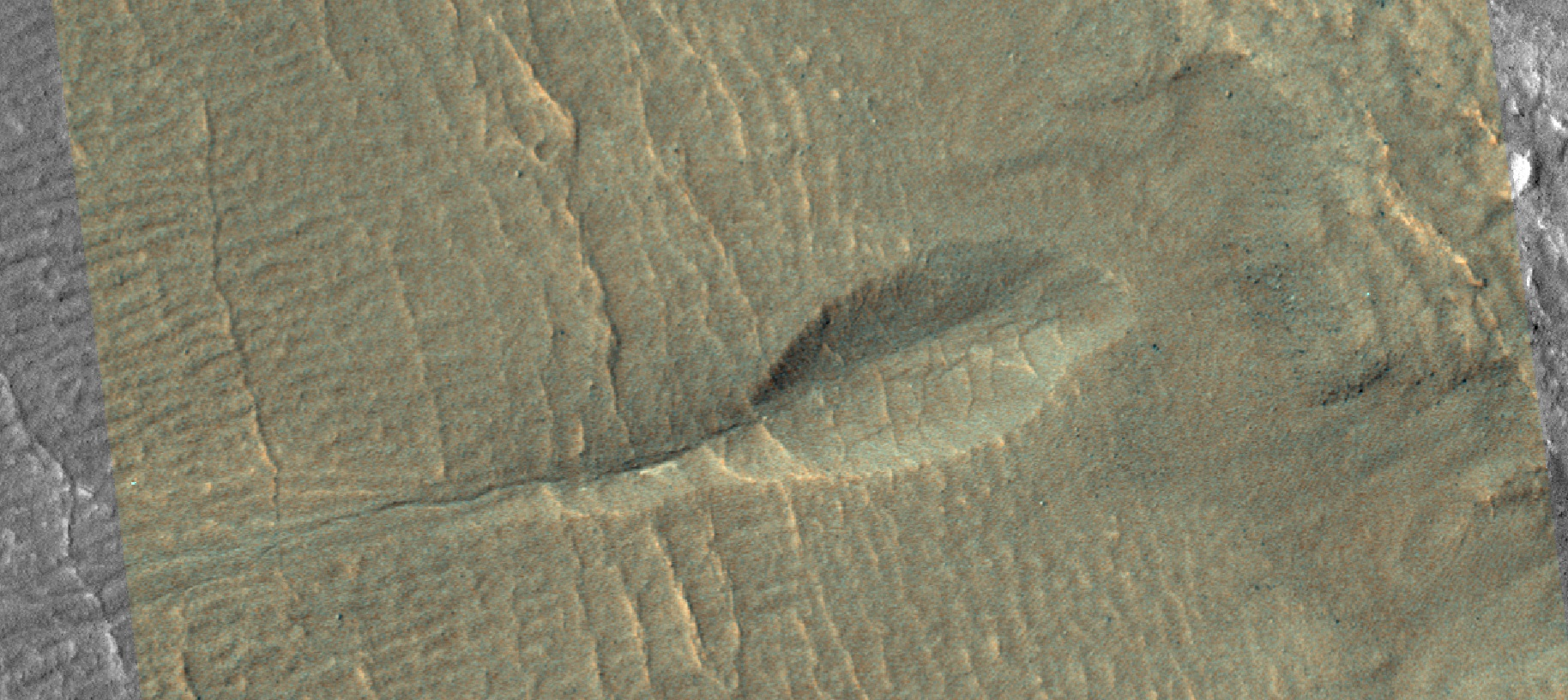
Small gully This gully may be in its initial state of formation.

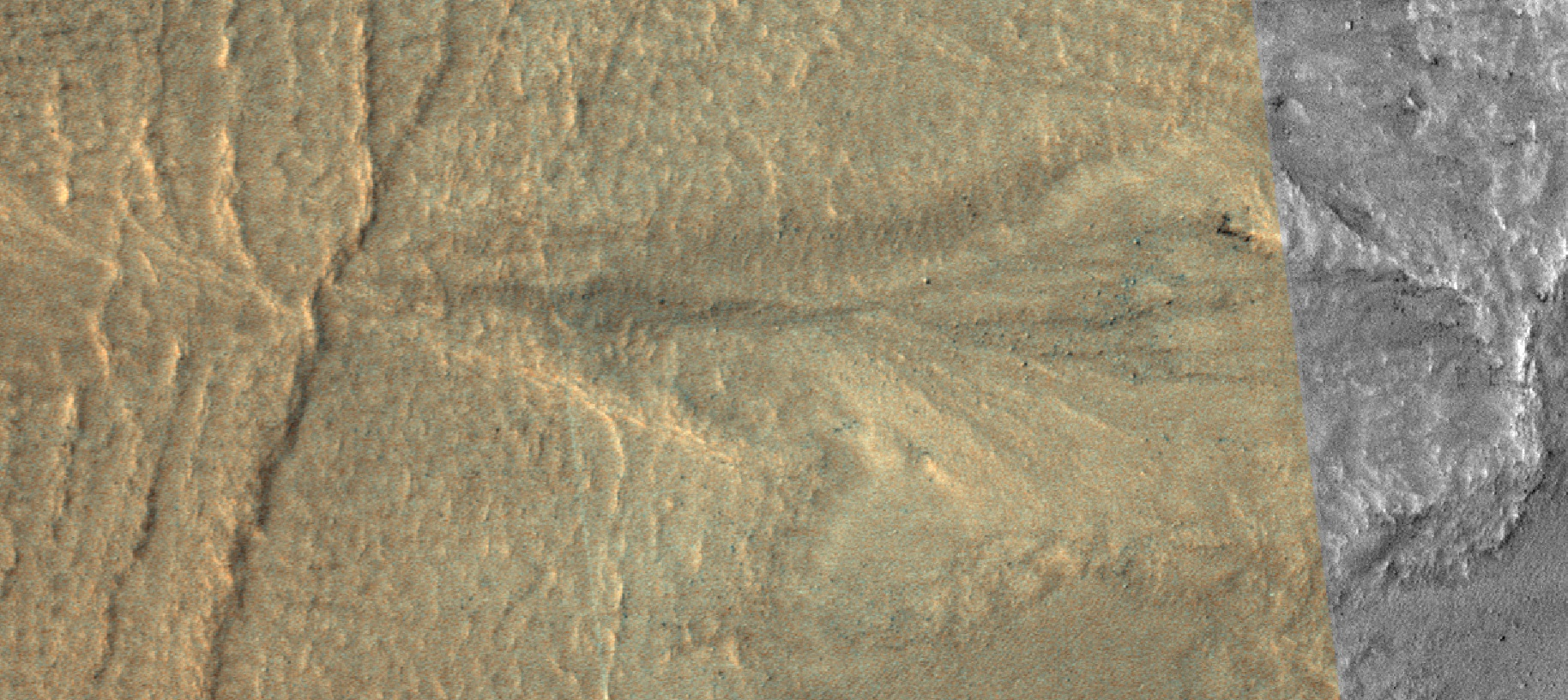
Gully, as seen by HiRISE

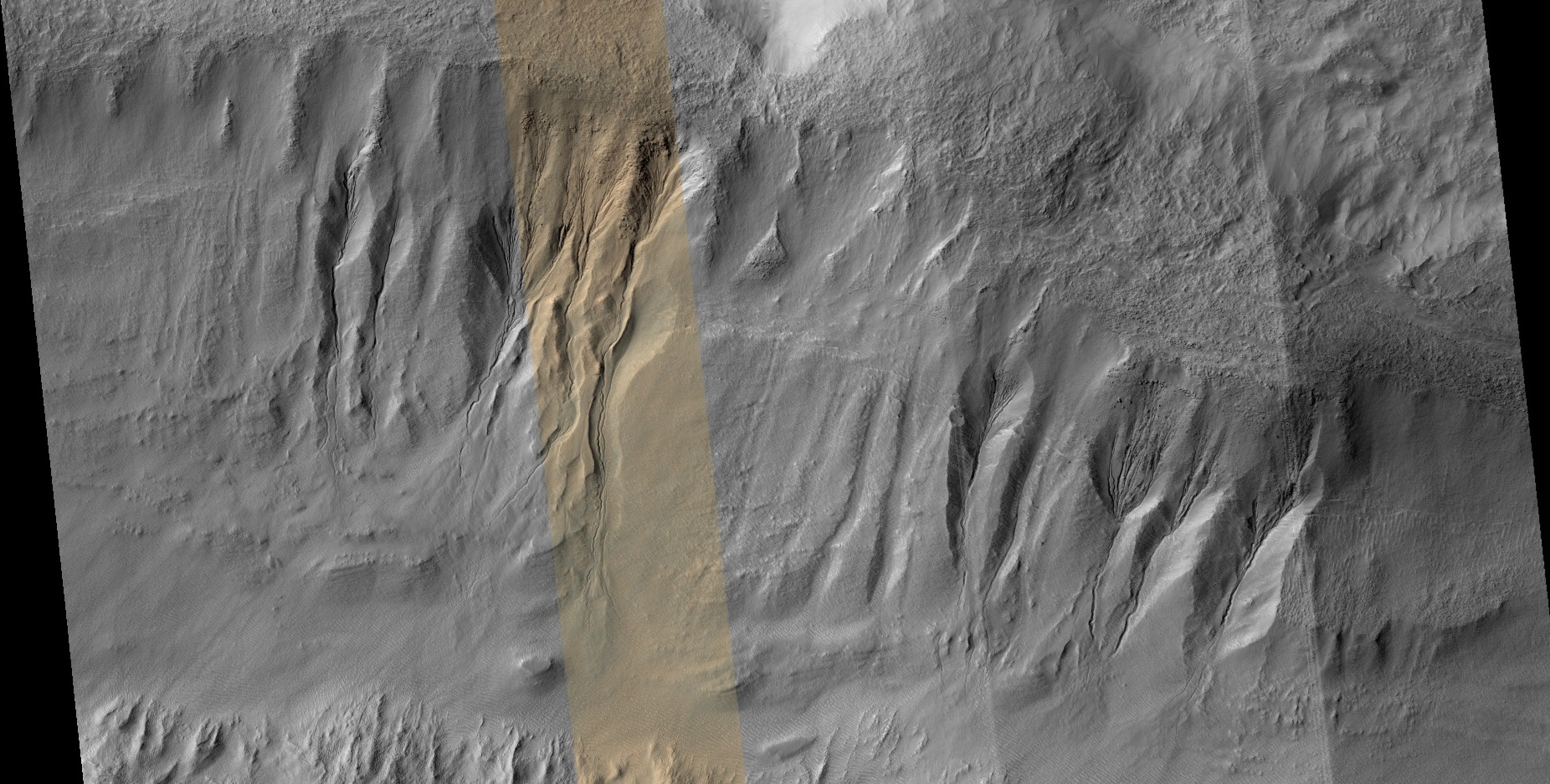
Wide view of gullies

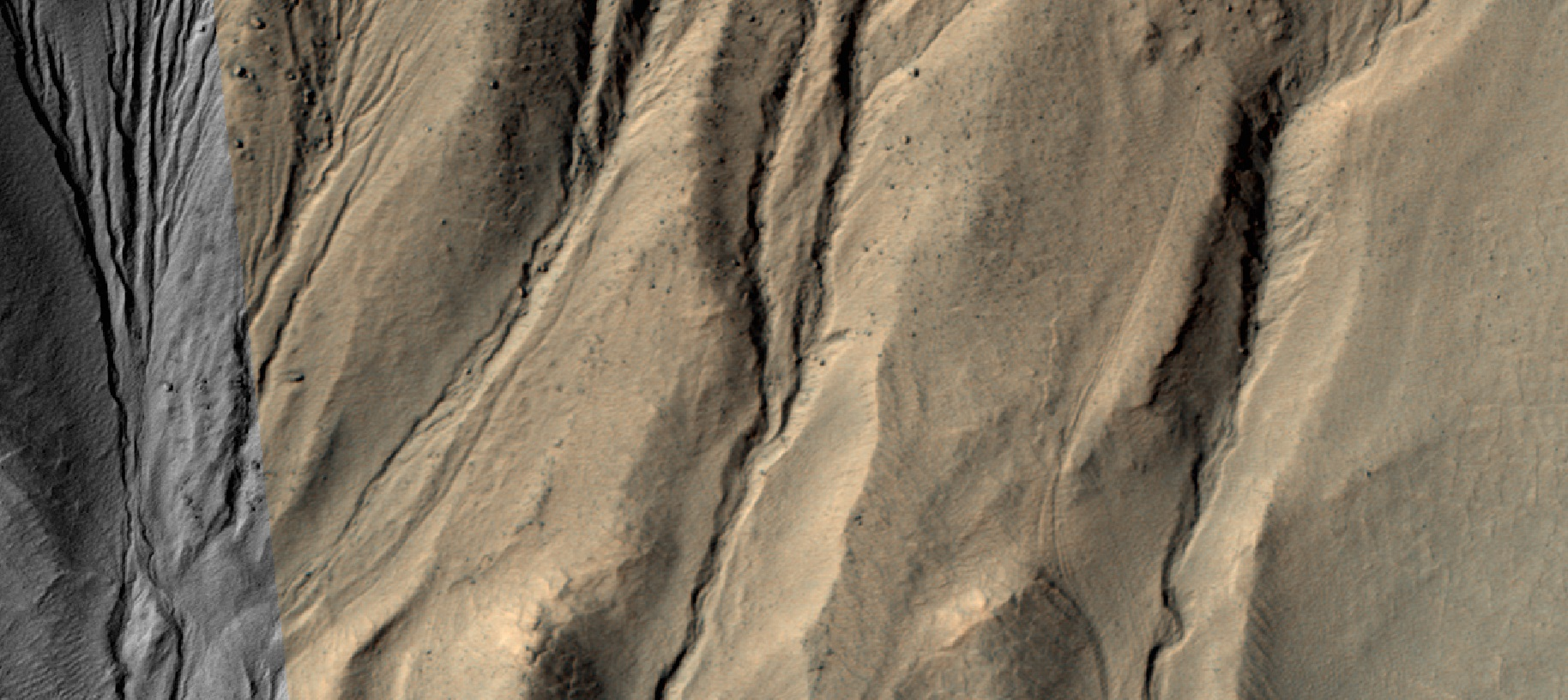
Close view of gully alcoves Picture is about 1 km across.

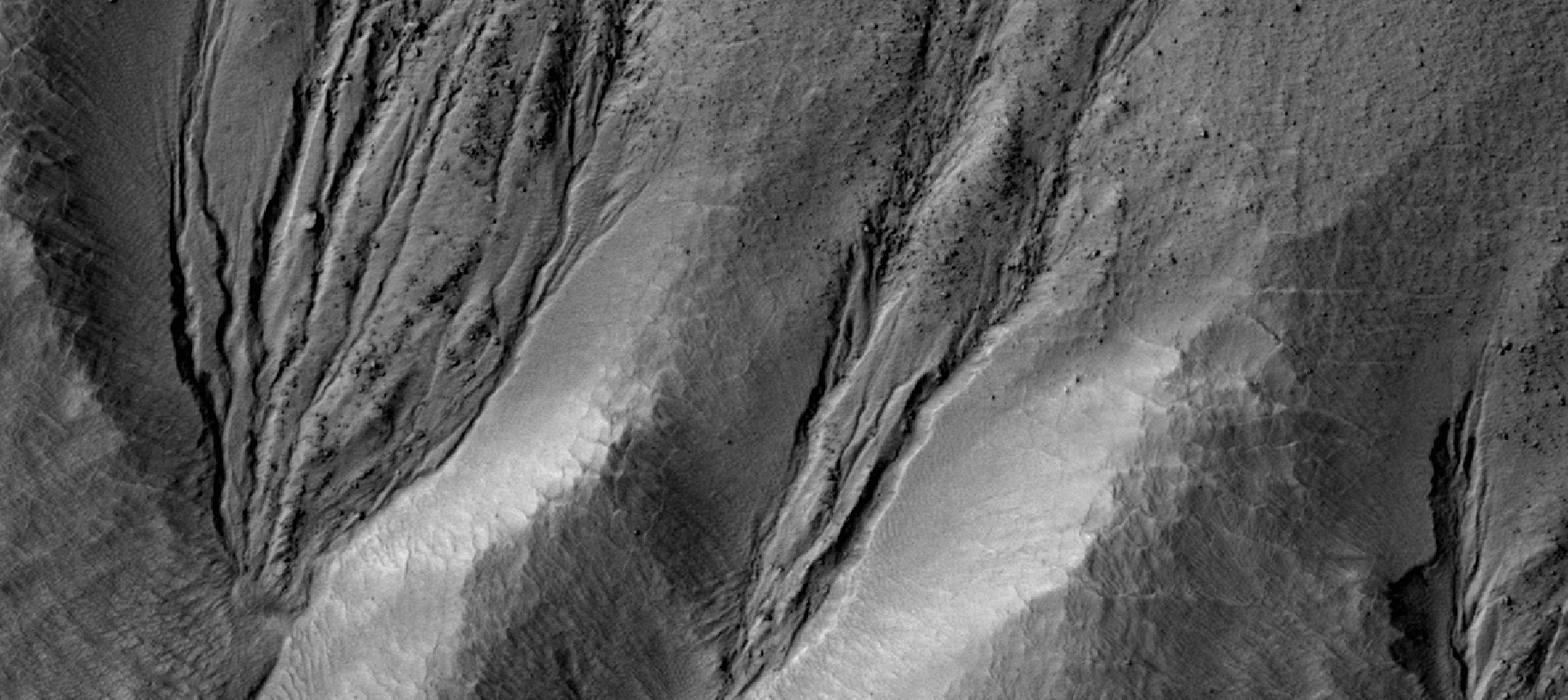
Close view of gully alcoves Picture is about 1 km across.

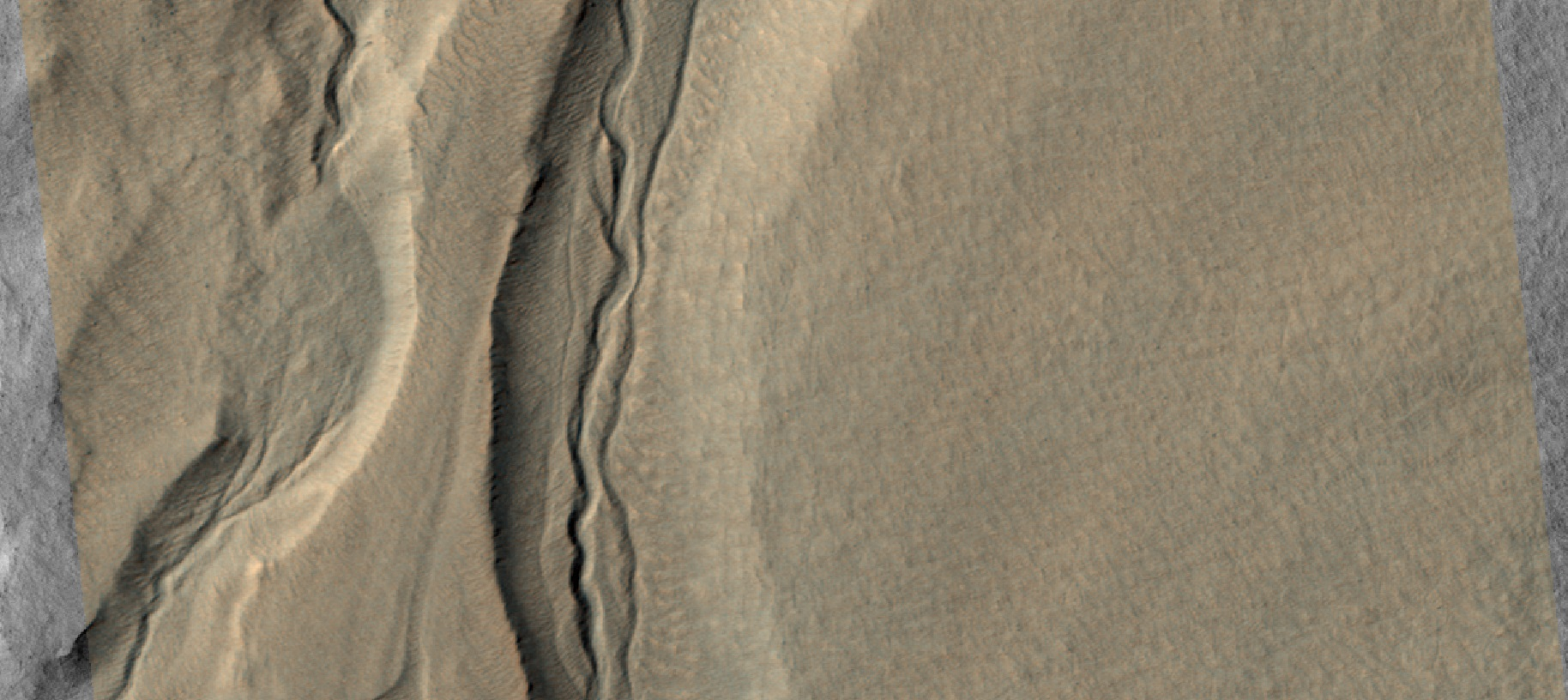
Close view of gully channels Picture is about 1 km across.

== Gullies on dunes ==
Gullies are found on some dunes. These are somewhat different than gullies in other places, like the walls of craters. Gullies on dunes seem to keep the same width for a long distance and often just end with a pit, instead of an apron. They are often just a few meters across with raised banks along the sides. Many of these gullies are found on dunes in Russell (Martian crater). In the winter dry ice accumulates on the dunes and then in the spring dark spots appear and dark-toned streaks grow downhill. After the dry ice is gone, new channels are visible. These gullies may be caused by blocks of dry ice moving down the steep slope or perhaps from dry ice starts the sand moving. In the thin atmosphere of mars, dry ice will expel carbon dioxide with vigor.

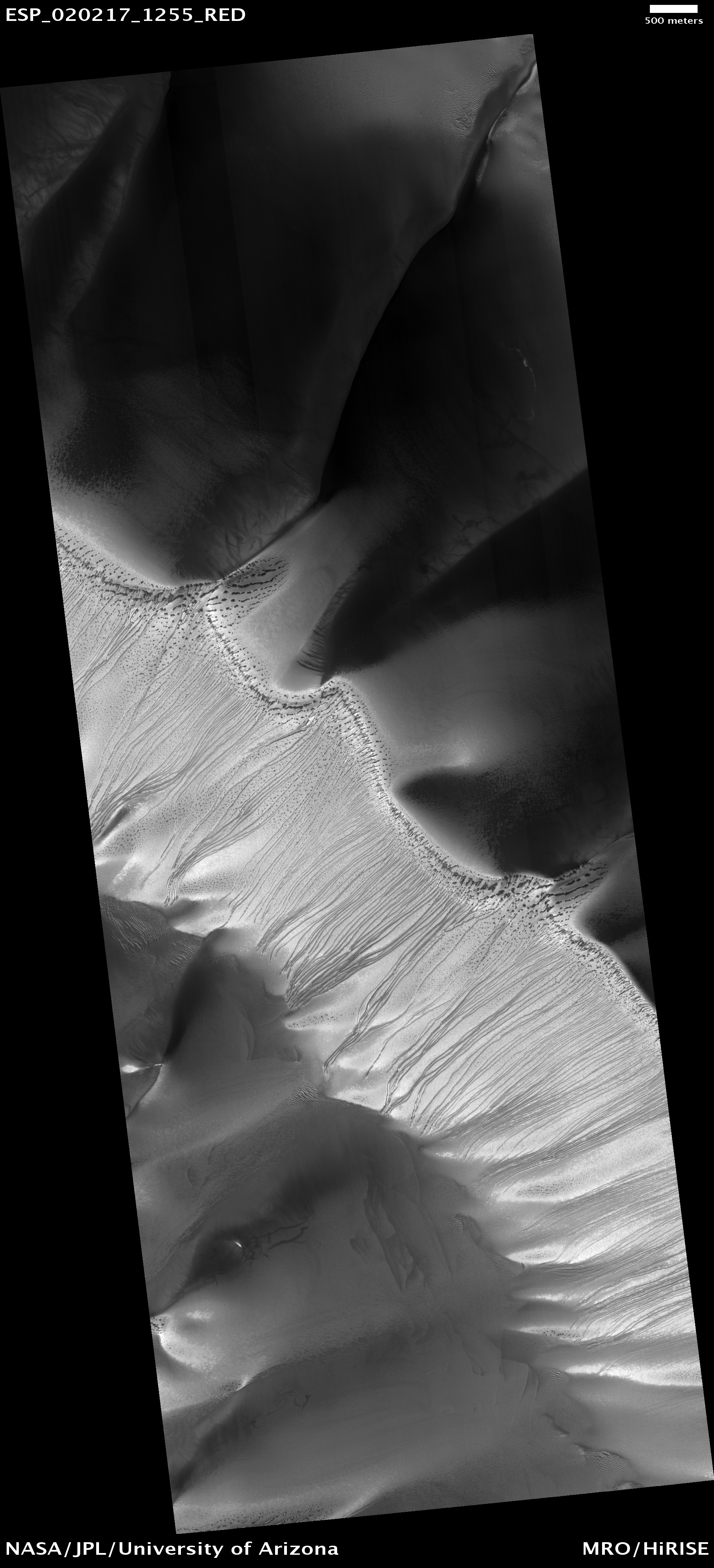
Wide view of dunes in Russell Crater, as seen by HiRISE Many narrow gullies are visible.

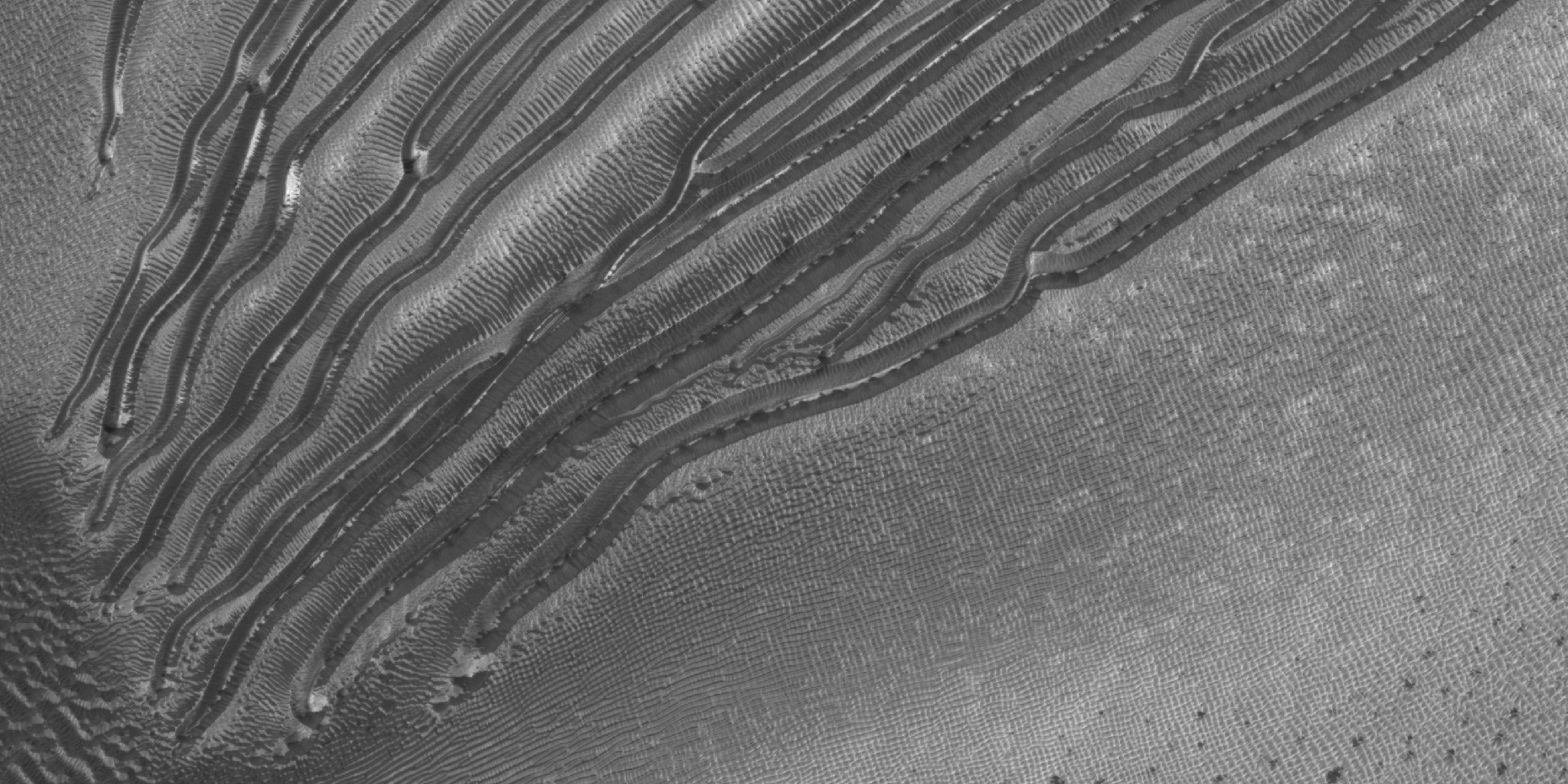
Close view of the end of gullies in Russell Crater, as seen by HiRISE Note: These types of gullies do not usually end with an apron. The location is Noachis quadrangle.

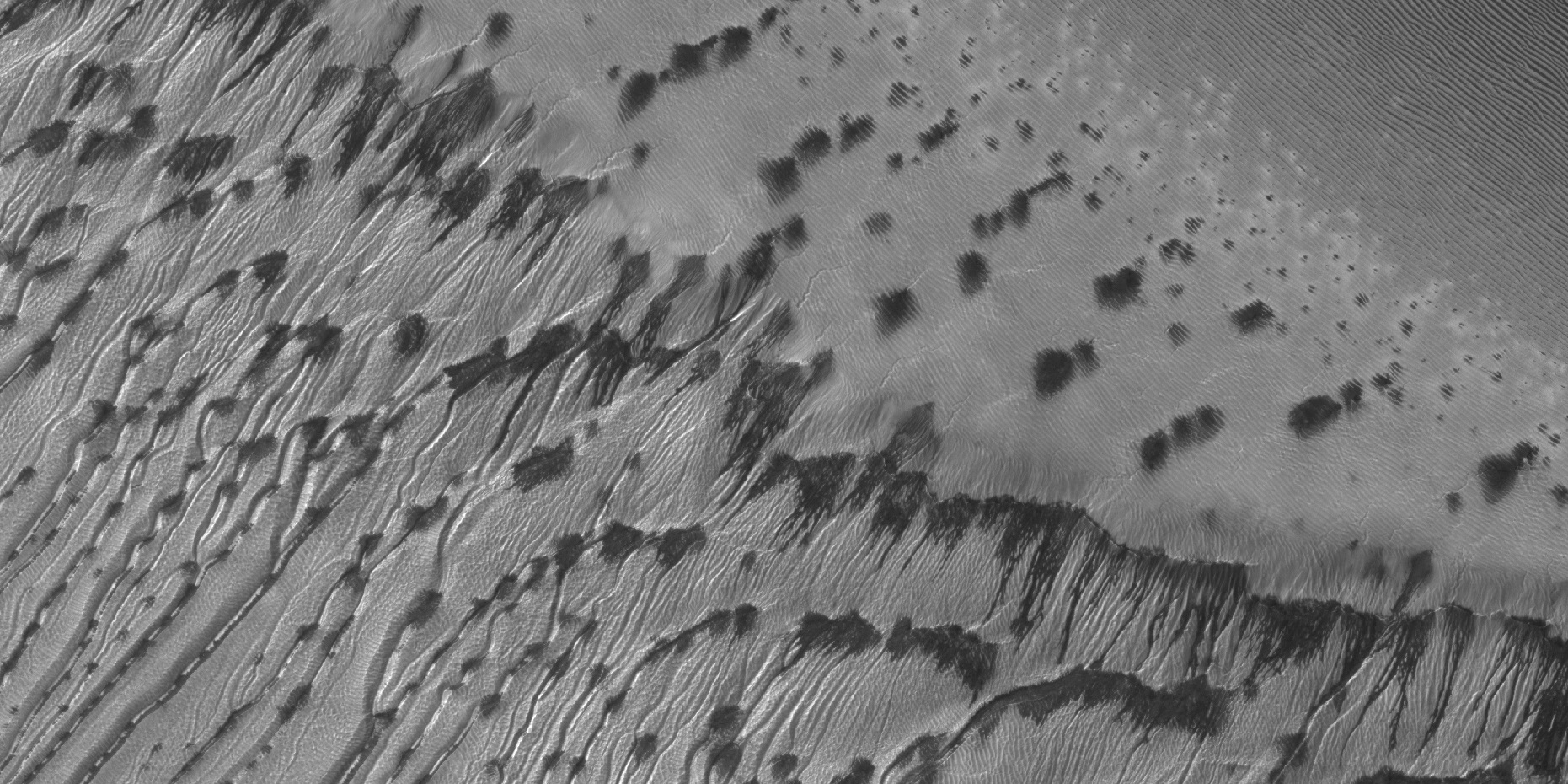
Close view of the end of gullies in Russell Crater, as seen by HiRISE

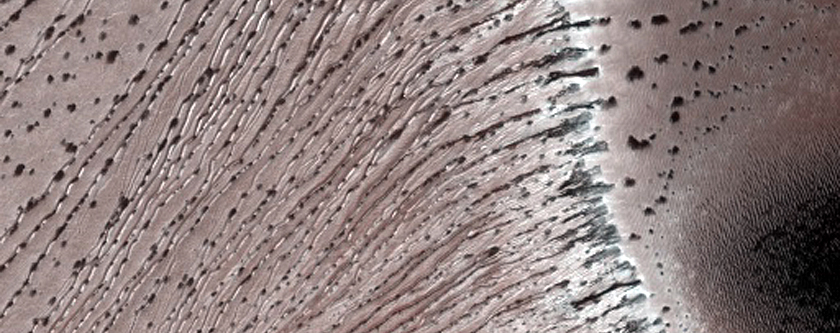
Close, color view of the end of gullies in Russell Crater, as seen by HiRISE

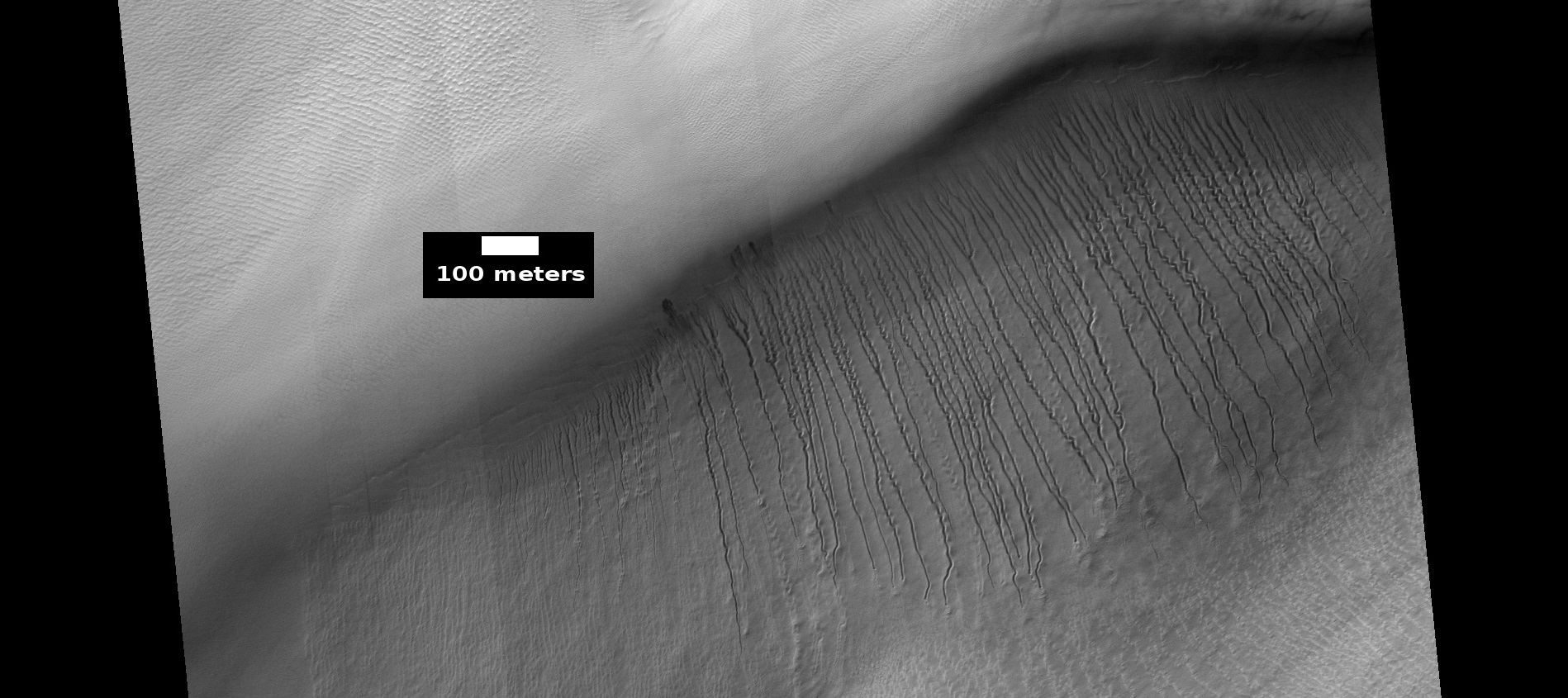
Gullies on dunes, as seen by HiRISE

== See also ==
- Argyre quadrangle – Map of Mars
- Climate of Mars
- Eridania quadrangle – Map of Mars
- Geology of Mars – Geology of fourth planet from the Sun
- Phaethontis quadrangle – Map of Mars
- Recurring slope lineae on Mars – Surface features on Mars
- Thaumasia quadrangle – Map of Mars
- Water on Mars – Study of past and present water on Mars
