= Galle (Martian crater) =

Crater on Mars, also known as the "happy face crater"

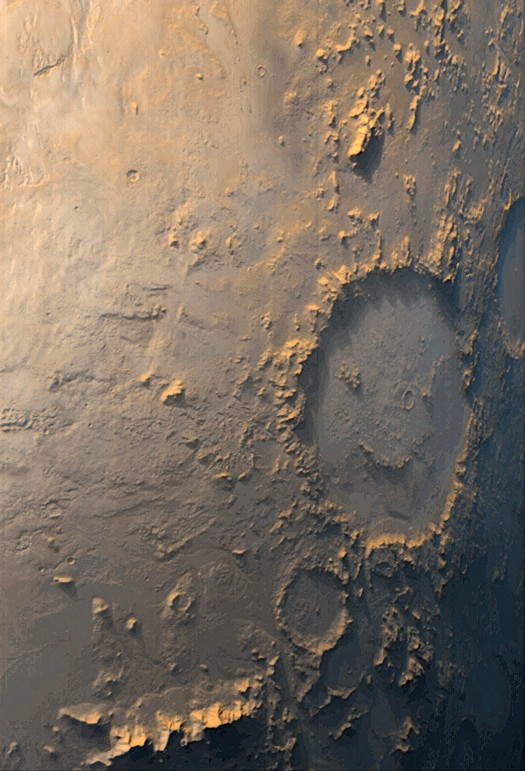
- Photographed by the Mars Global Surveyor, 1999-03-10
- Planet: Mars
- Coordinates: 51.2°S 30.9°W
- Quadrangle: Argyre
- Diameter: 230.0 km
- Eponym: Johann Gottfried Galle

Galle is a crater on Mars. It is located on the eastern rim of the huge impact basin Argyre Planitia in Argyre quadrangle. It is named after the German astronomer Johann Gottfried Galle. Galle is often known as the "happy face crater" because pareidolia causes a curved mountain range in the southern part of the crater and two smaller mountain clusters further north to appear to be a smiley face. The formation was first photographed by Viking Orbiter 1 in 1976.

A second "happy face crater", smaller than Galle and located at 45.1°S, 55.0°W in Nereidum Montes, was discovered by the Mars Reconnaissance Orbiter on January 28, 2008.

== Appearance in Watchmen ==
As the smiley is a key motif in the comic book Watchmen by Alan Moore and Dave Gibbons, the crater was used as a story location after the coincidence was noted by Gibbons. According to Gibbons, the similarity "was almost too good to be true. I worried that if we put it in, people would never believe it." The crater also appears in the same scene during the film adaptation.

== Gallery ==
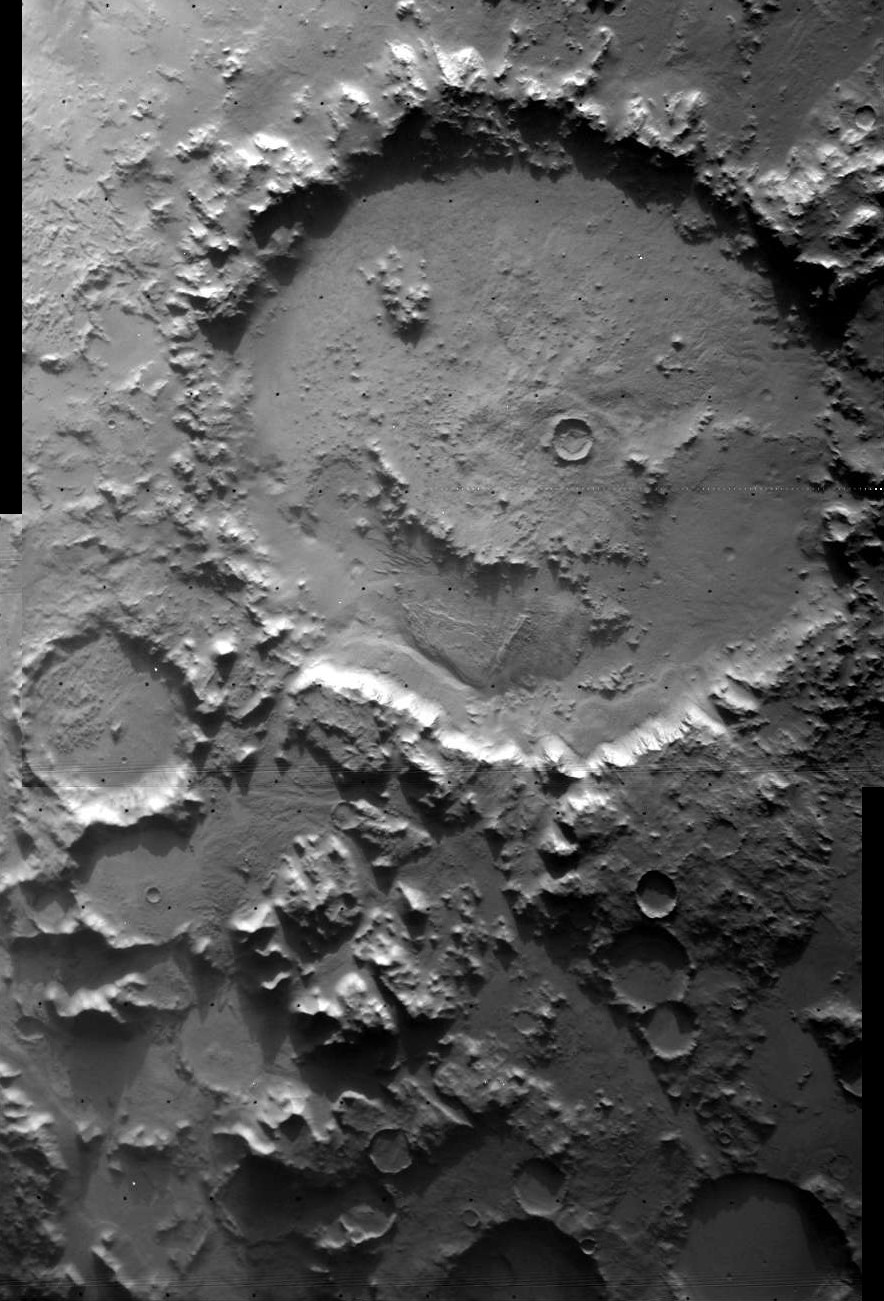
Viking Orbiter 1 mosaic

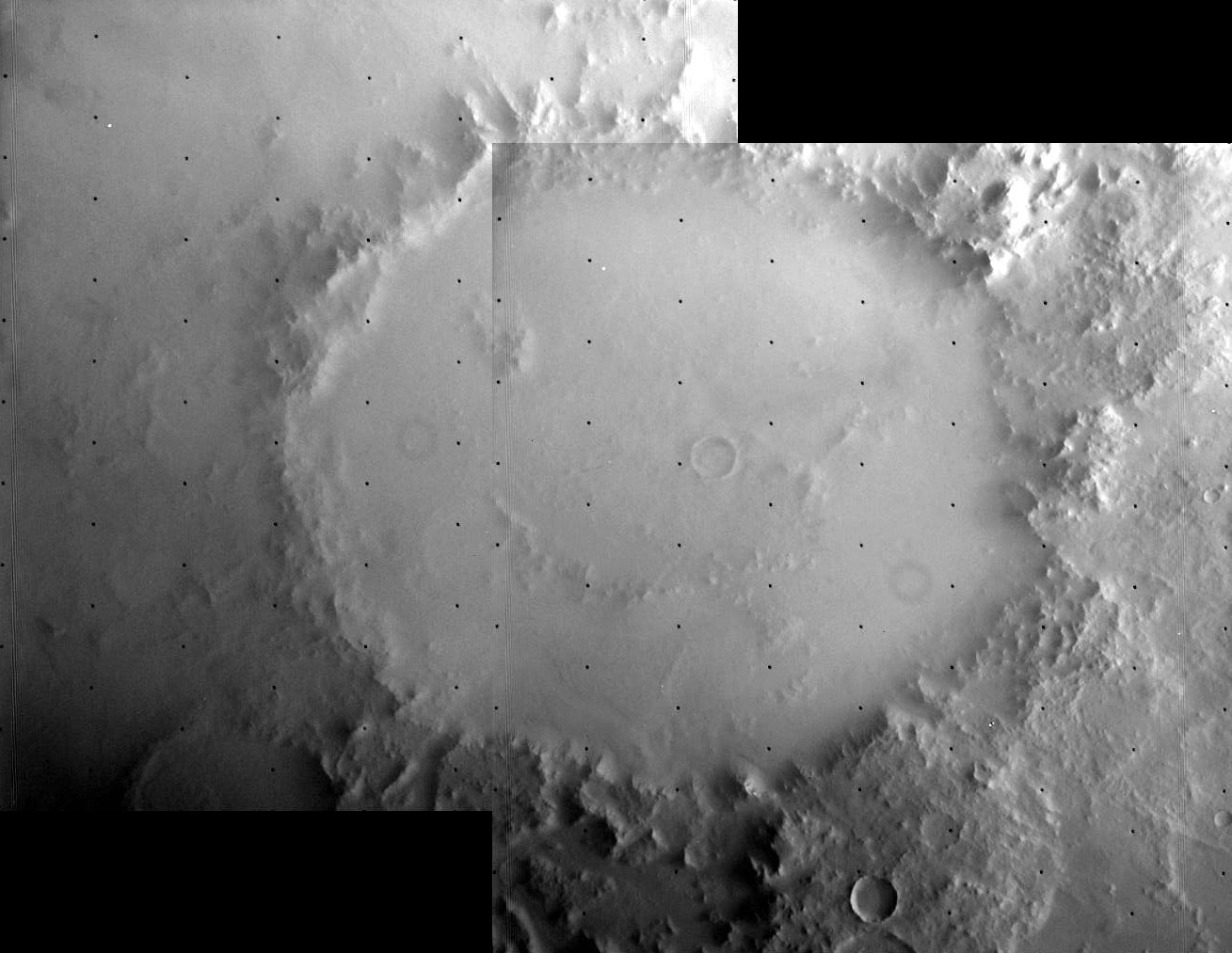
Another Viking 1 mosaic

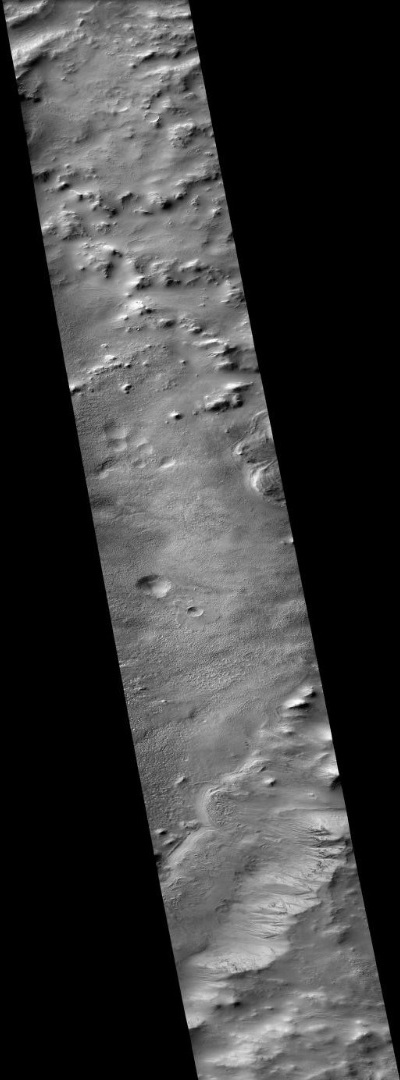
East side of Galle crater, as seen by CTX camera (on MRO).

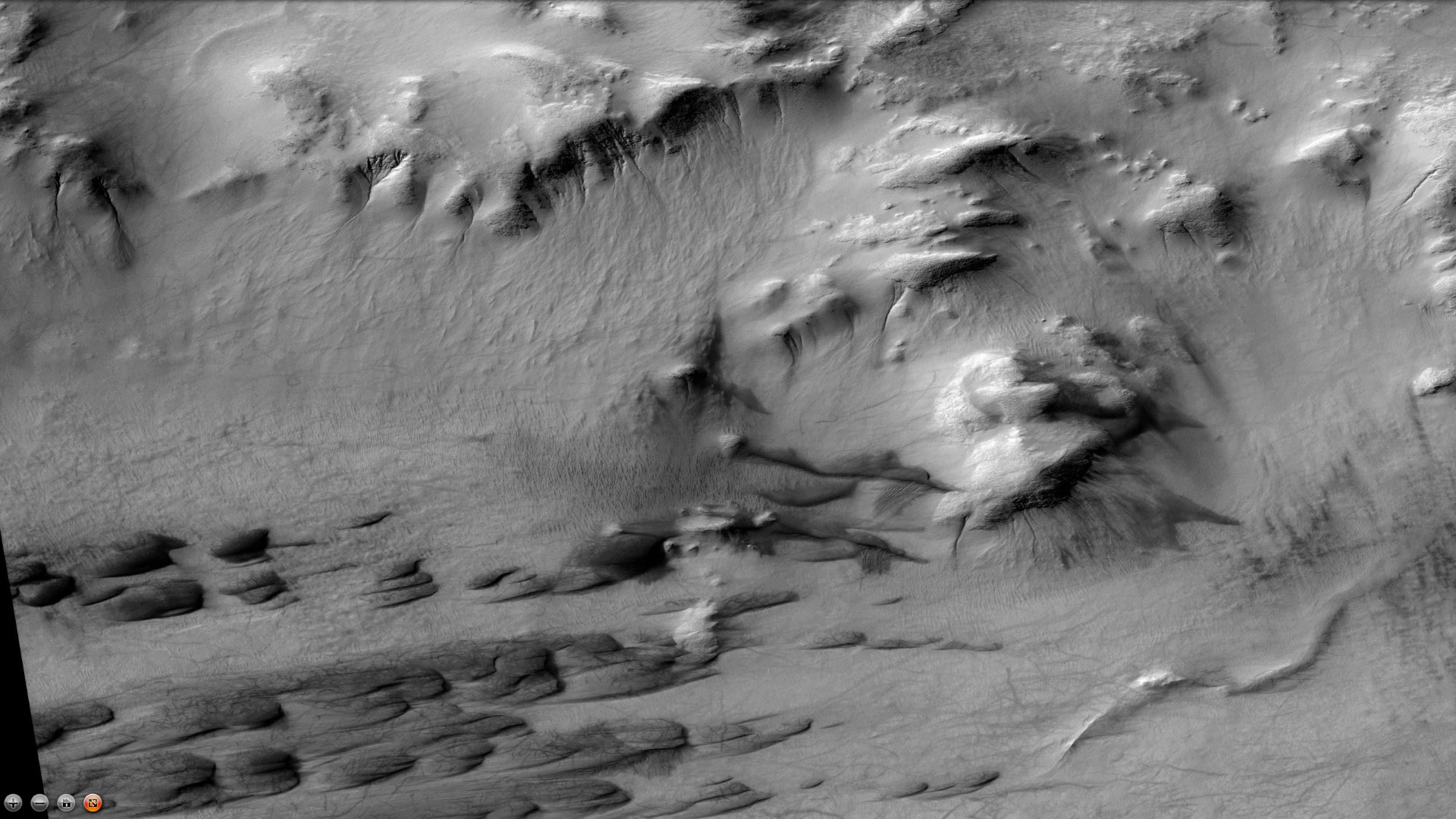
Gullies on mounds and dunes in Galle crater, as seen by CTX camera. Note this is an enlargement of previous photo.

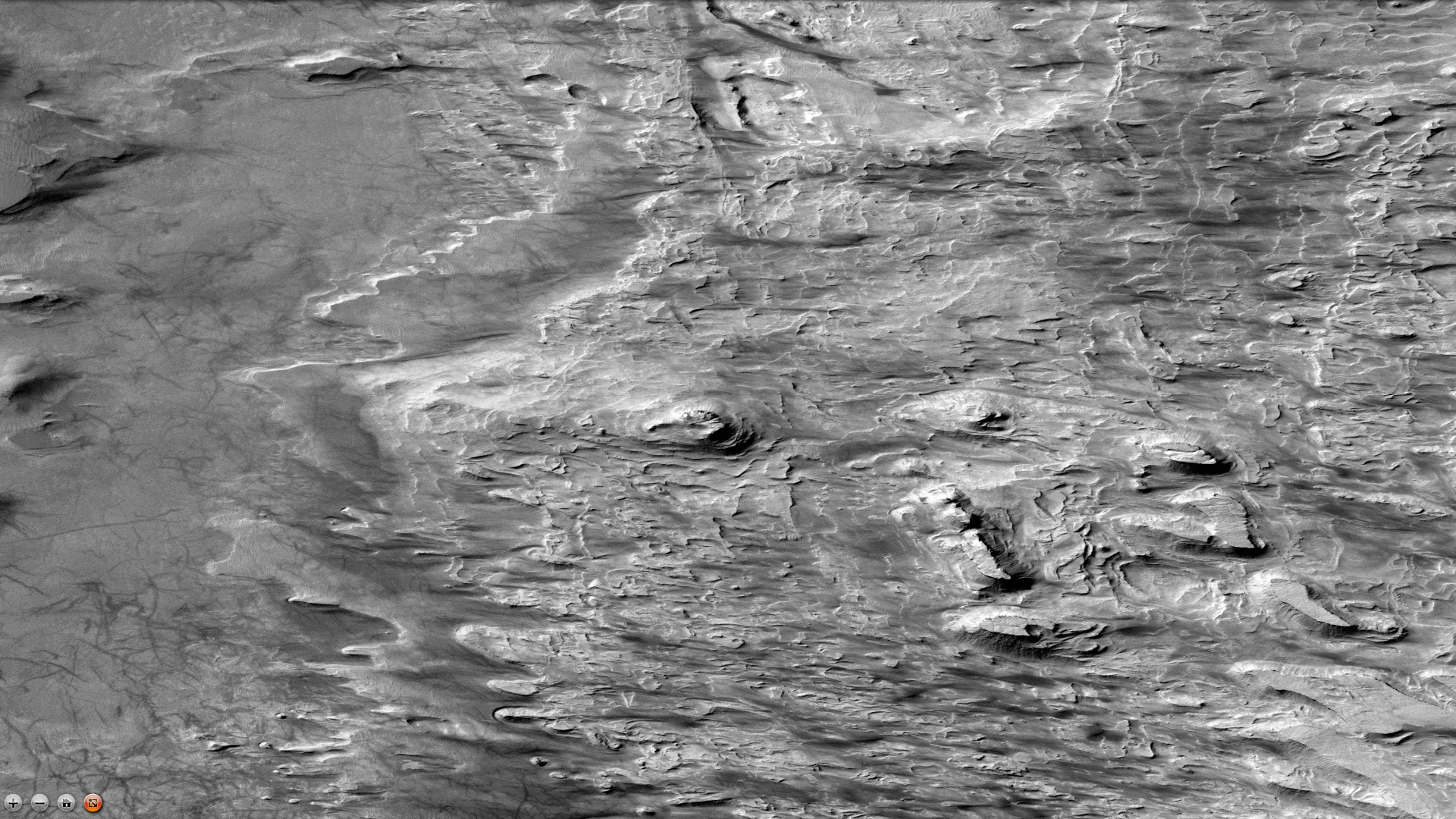
Layered deposit in Galle crater, as seen by CTX camera. Note: this is an enlargement of a previous image.

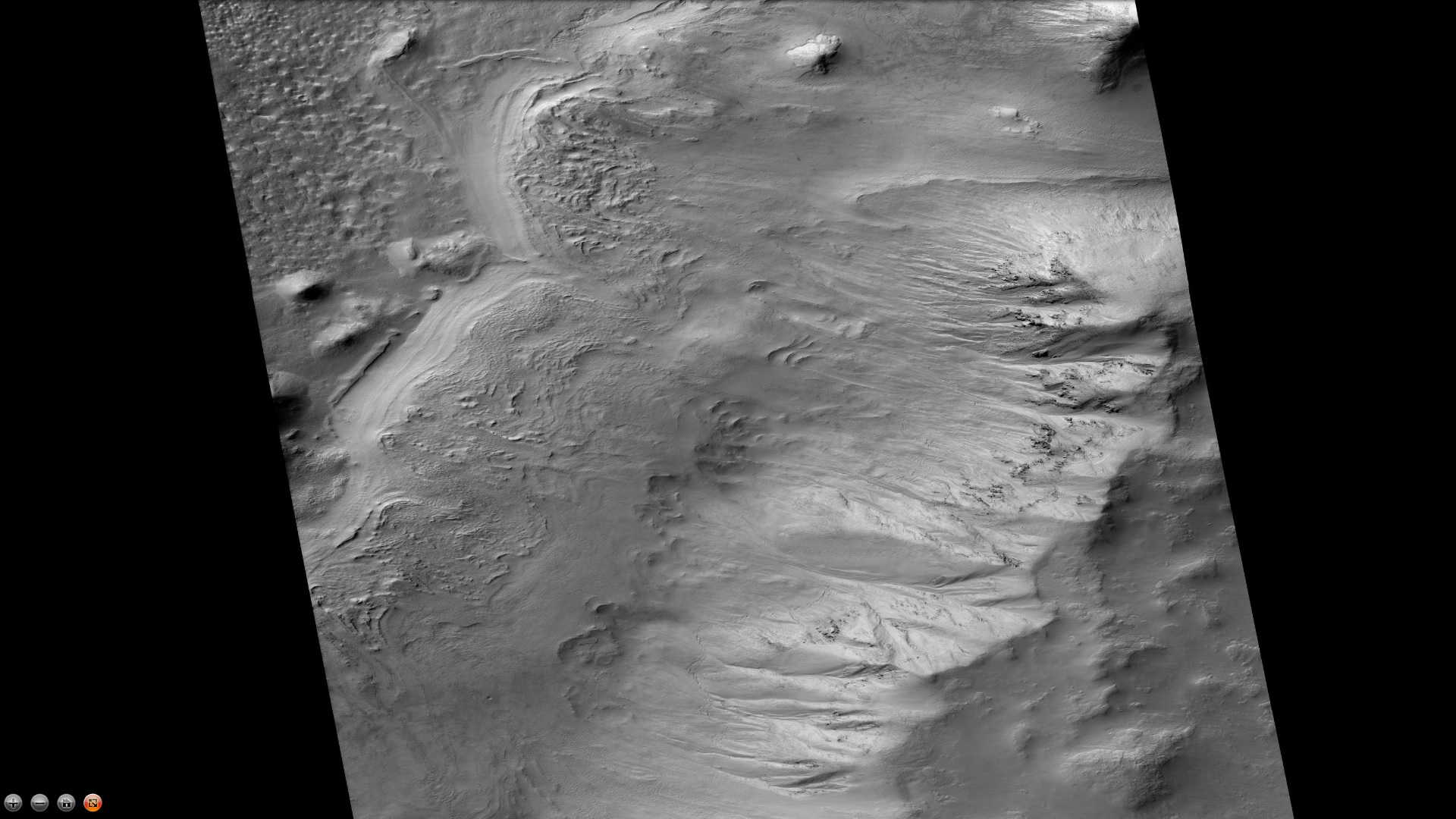
Old glacial flows and gullies on eastern side of Galle crater, as seen by CTX camera. Note: this is an enlargement of the previous photo.

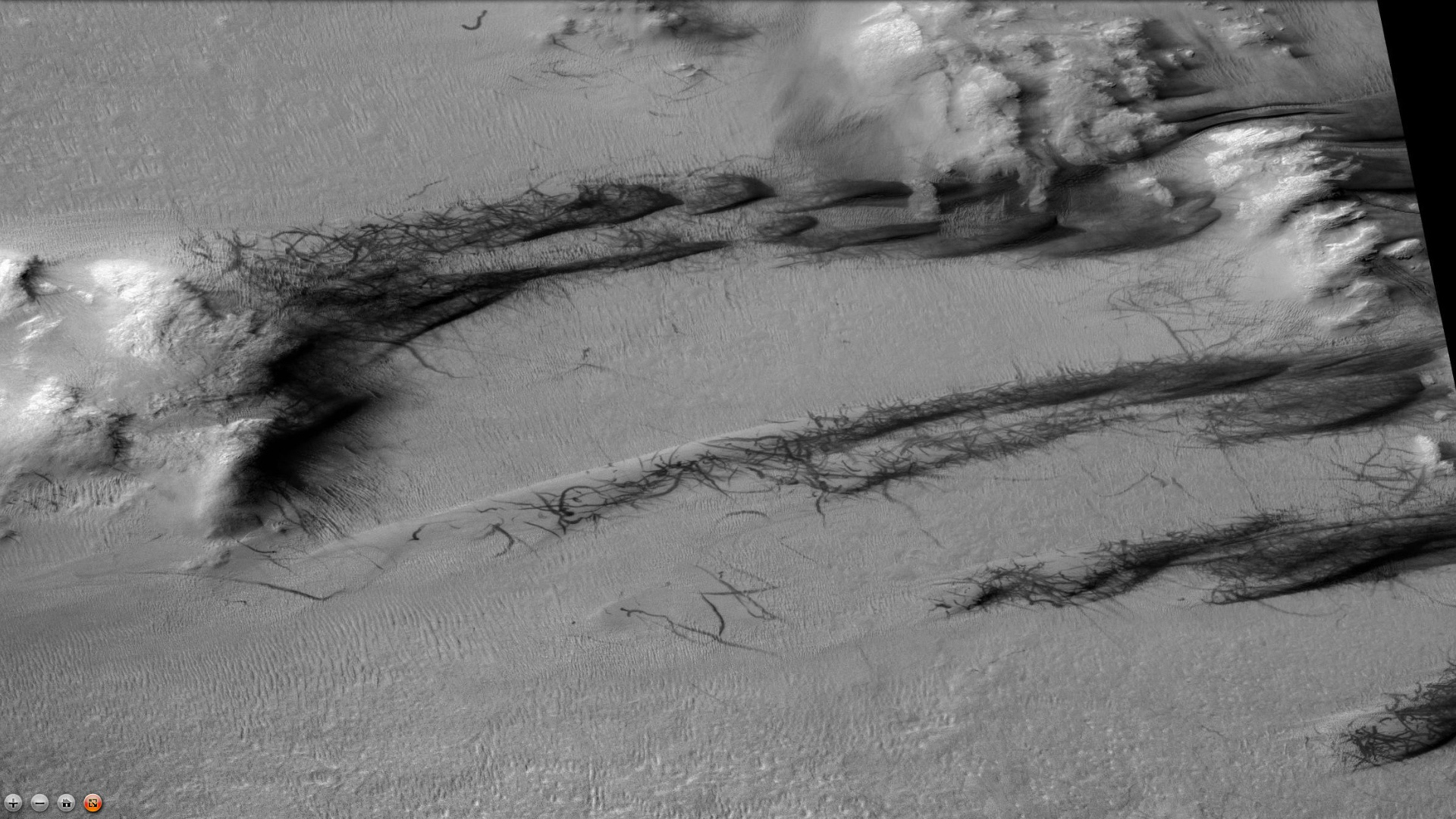
Dunes and dust devil tracks in Galle crater, as seen by CTX camera.

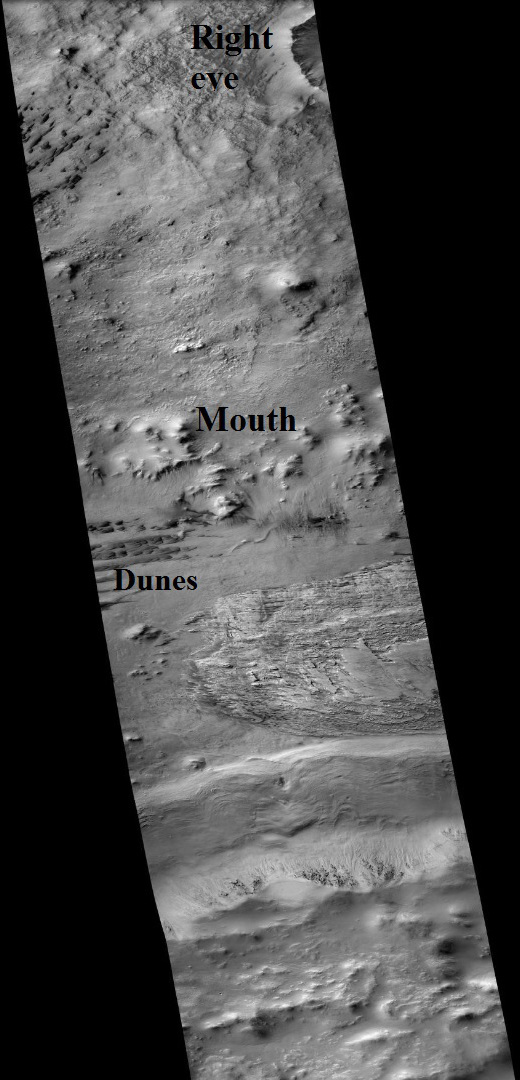
Part of Galle crater, as seen by CTX camera. The right "eye" and "mouth" are labeled. One of two dune fields are labeled as well.

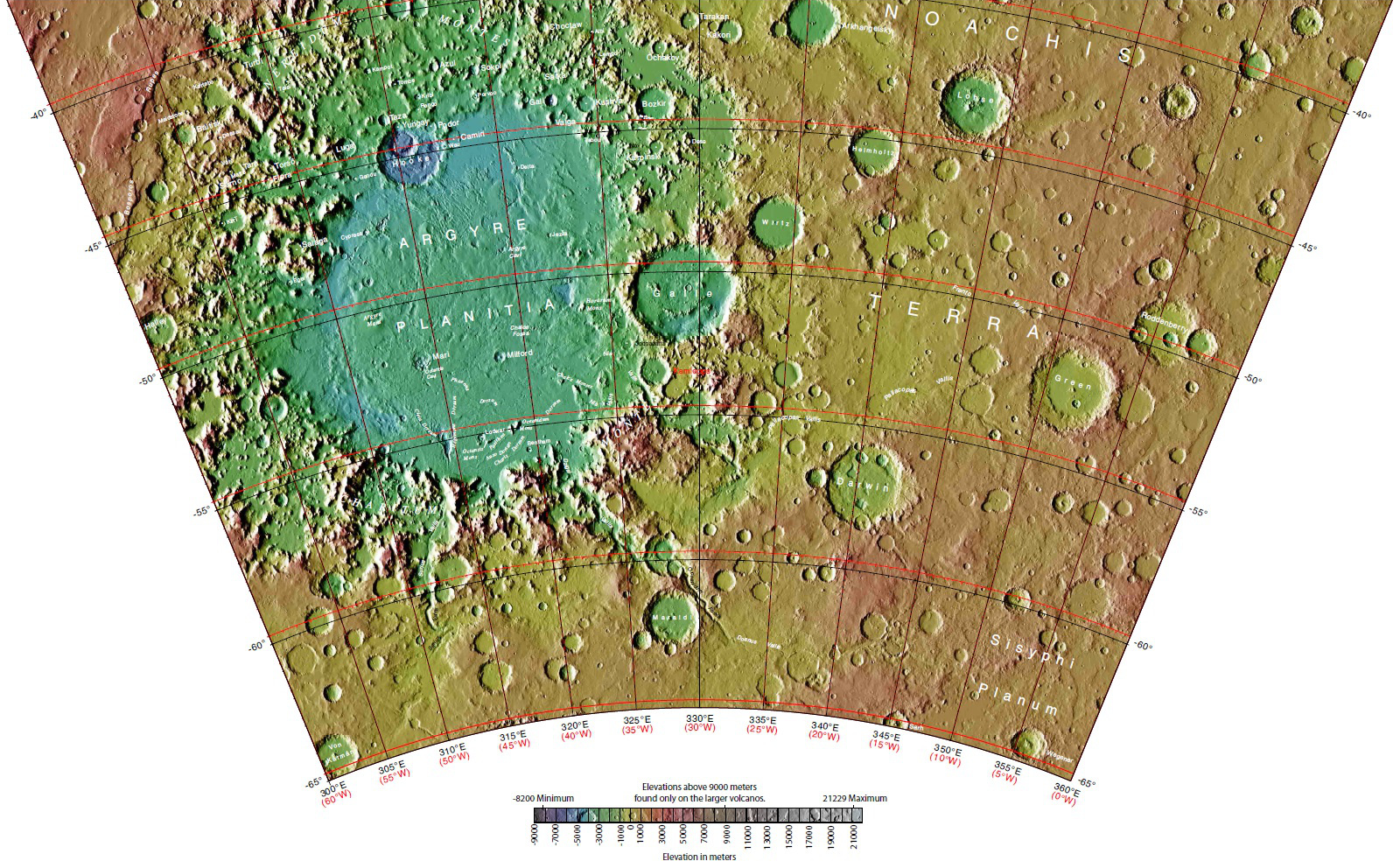
Wide view of area around Galle crater. Colors show elevations.

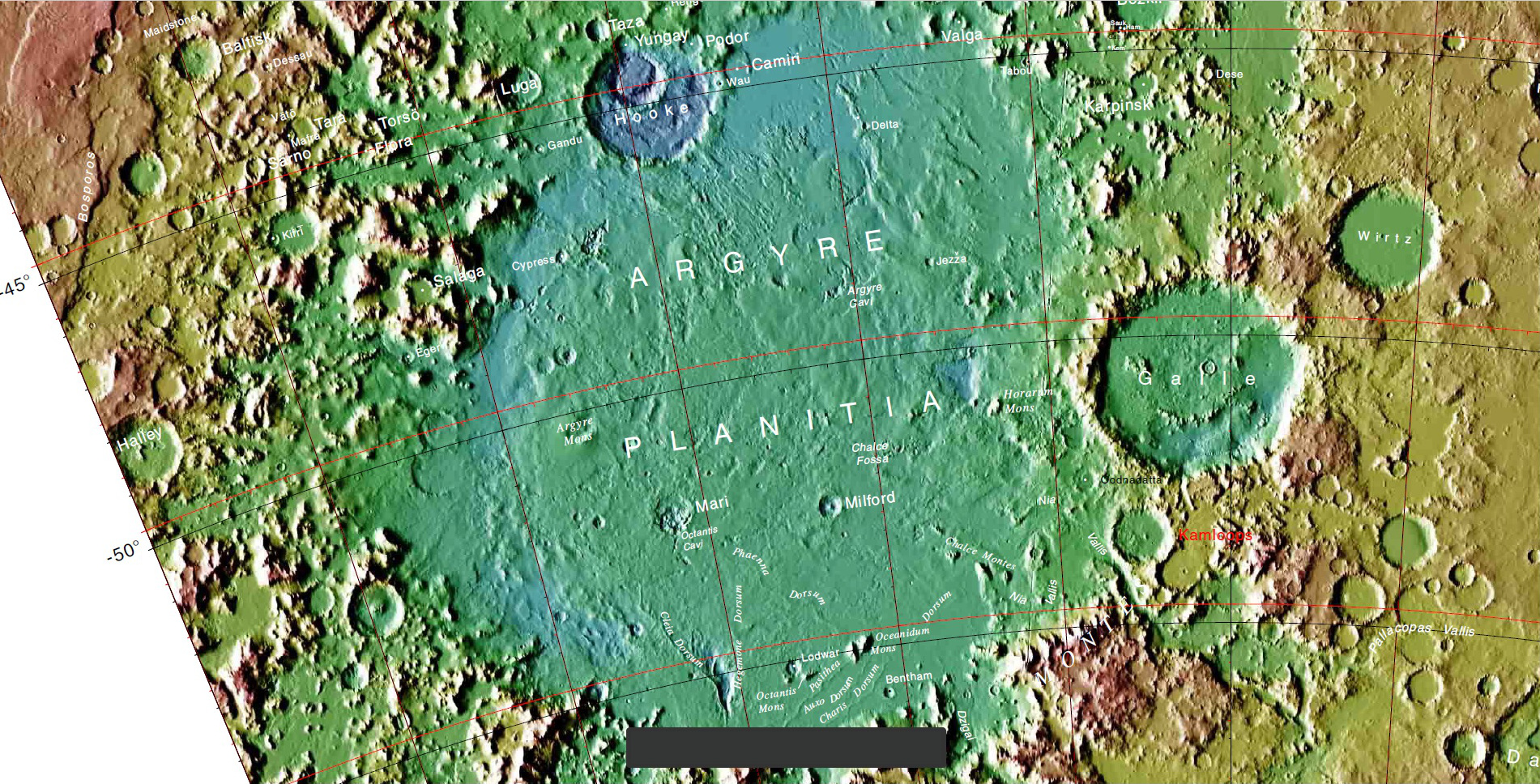
Region around Galle crater. Colors show elevations.

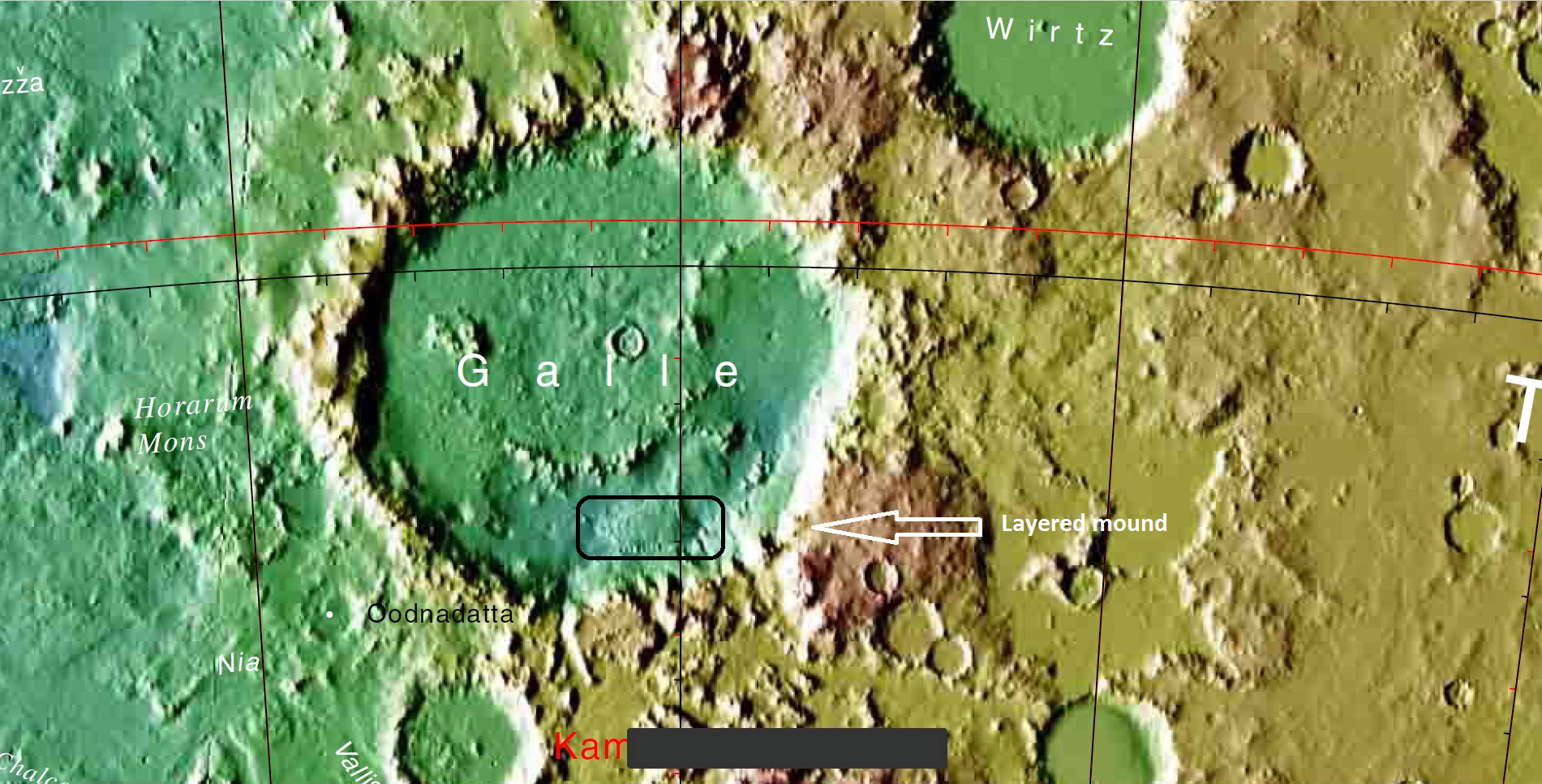
Galle crater. Colors show elevations. Arrow indicates a layered mound that is enlarged in other images to follow.

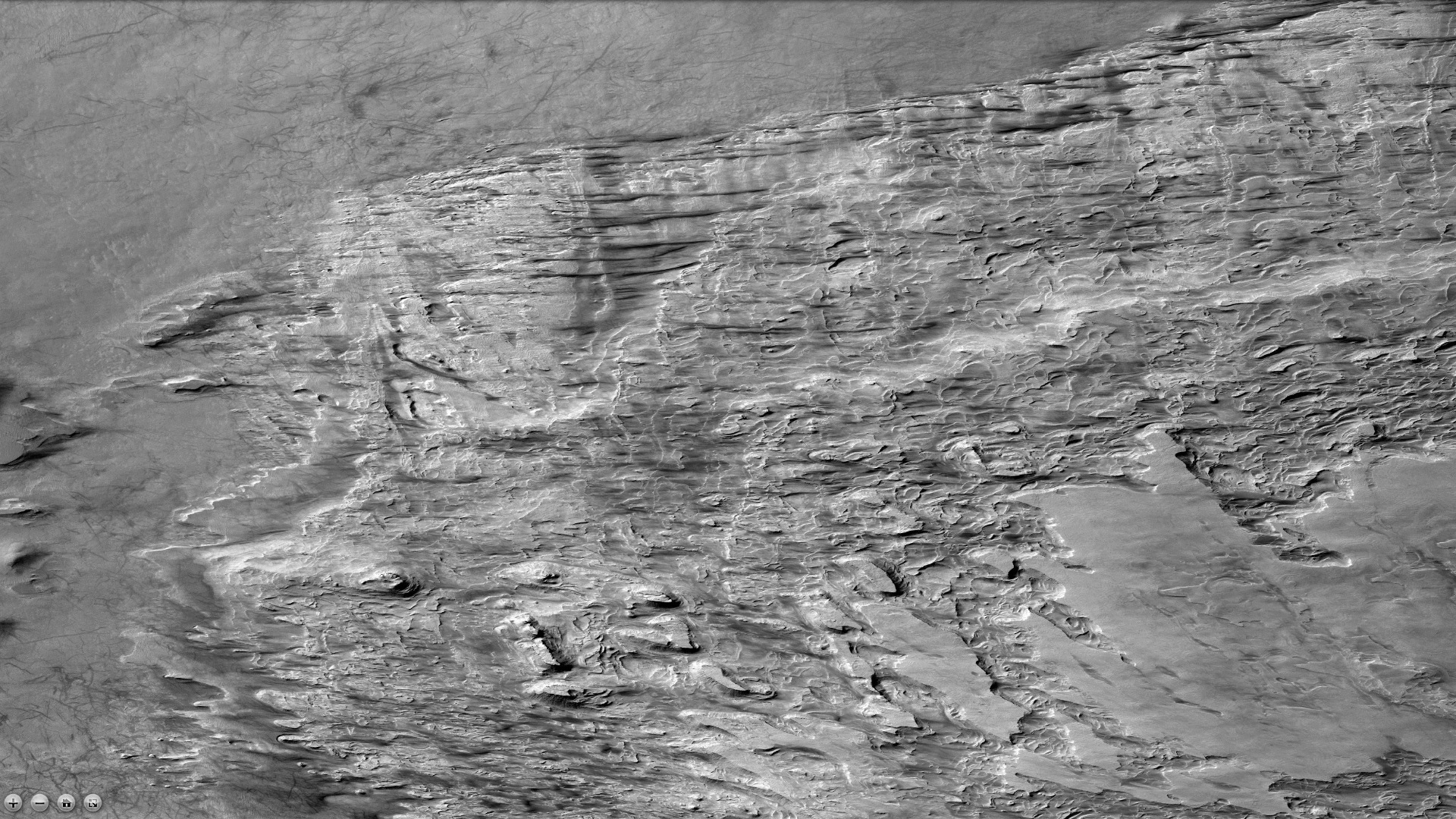
Wide CTX view of part of layered mound. Parts of this mound are enlarged in HiRISE images that follow.

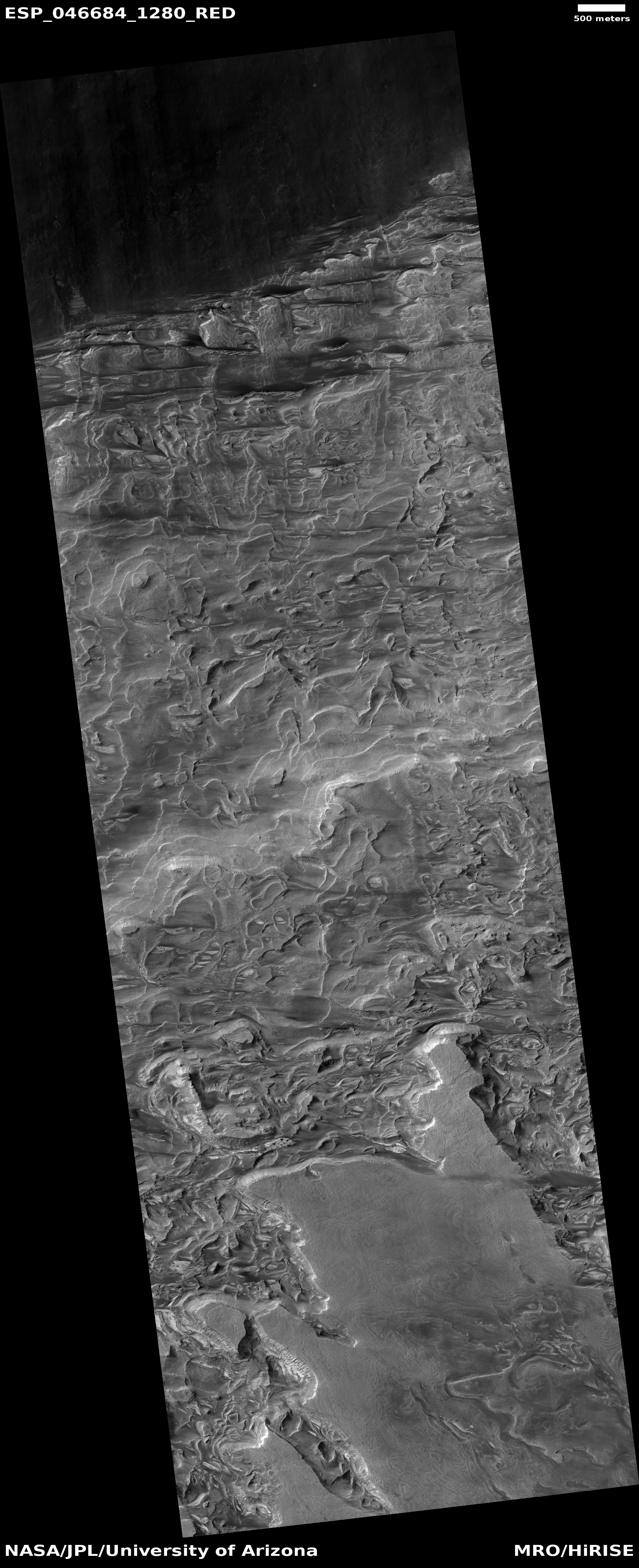
HiRISE image from area in previous image. Picture taken under HiWish program.

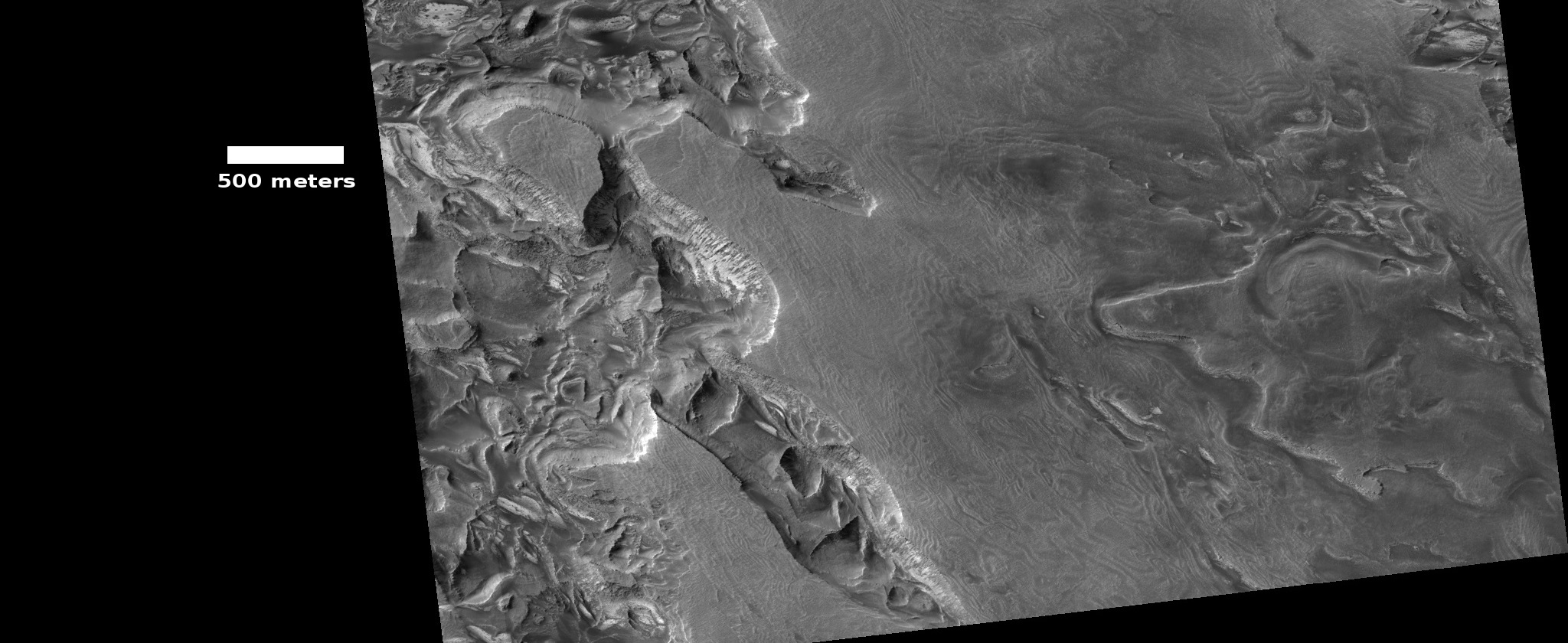
Layers in mound in Galle crater, as seen by HiRISE under HiWish program

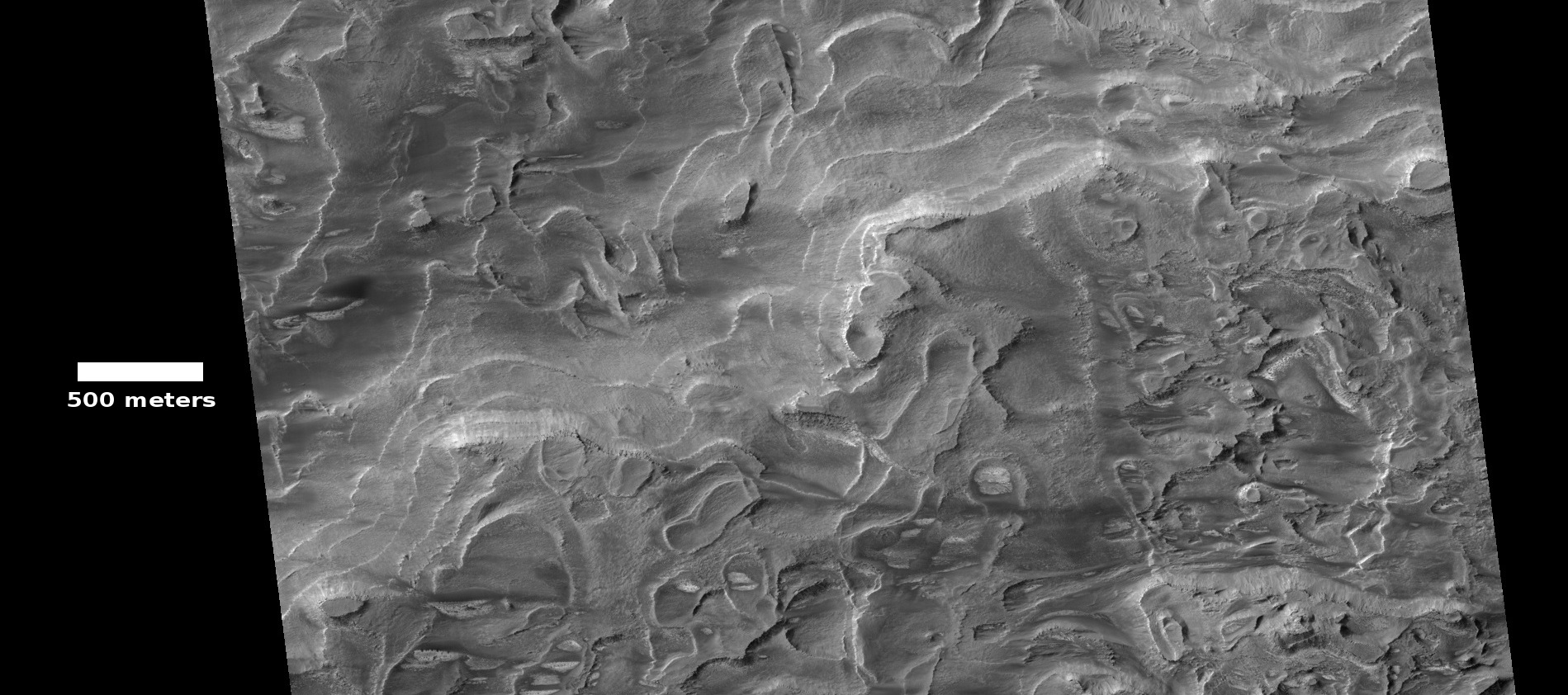
Layers in mound in Galle crater, as seen by HiRISE under HiWish program

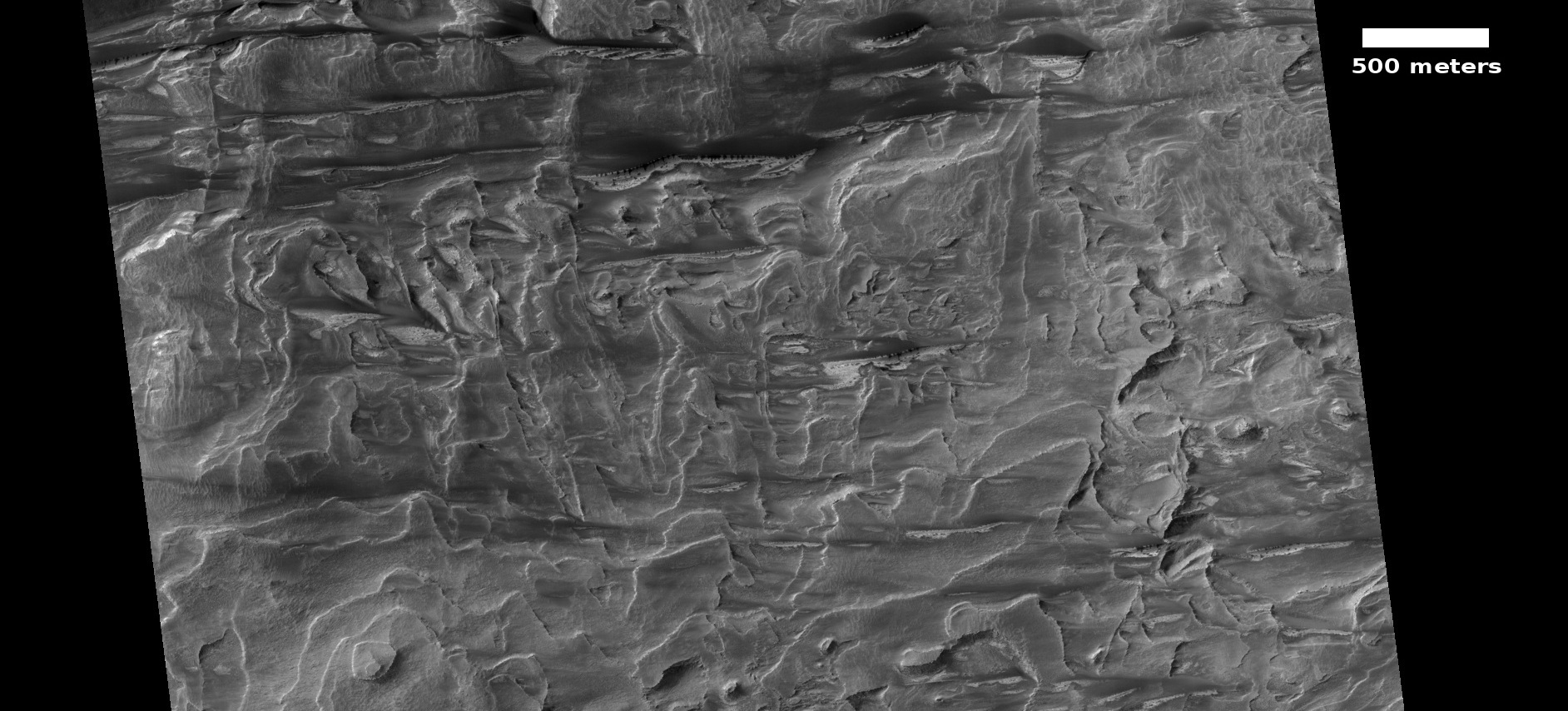
Layers in mound in Galle crater, as seen by HiRISE under HiWish program

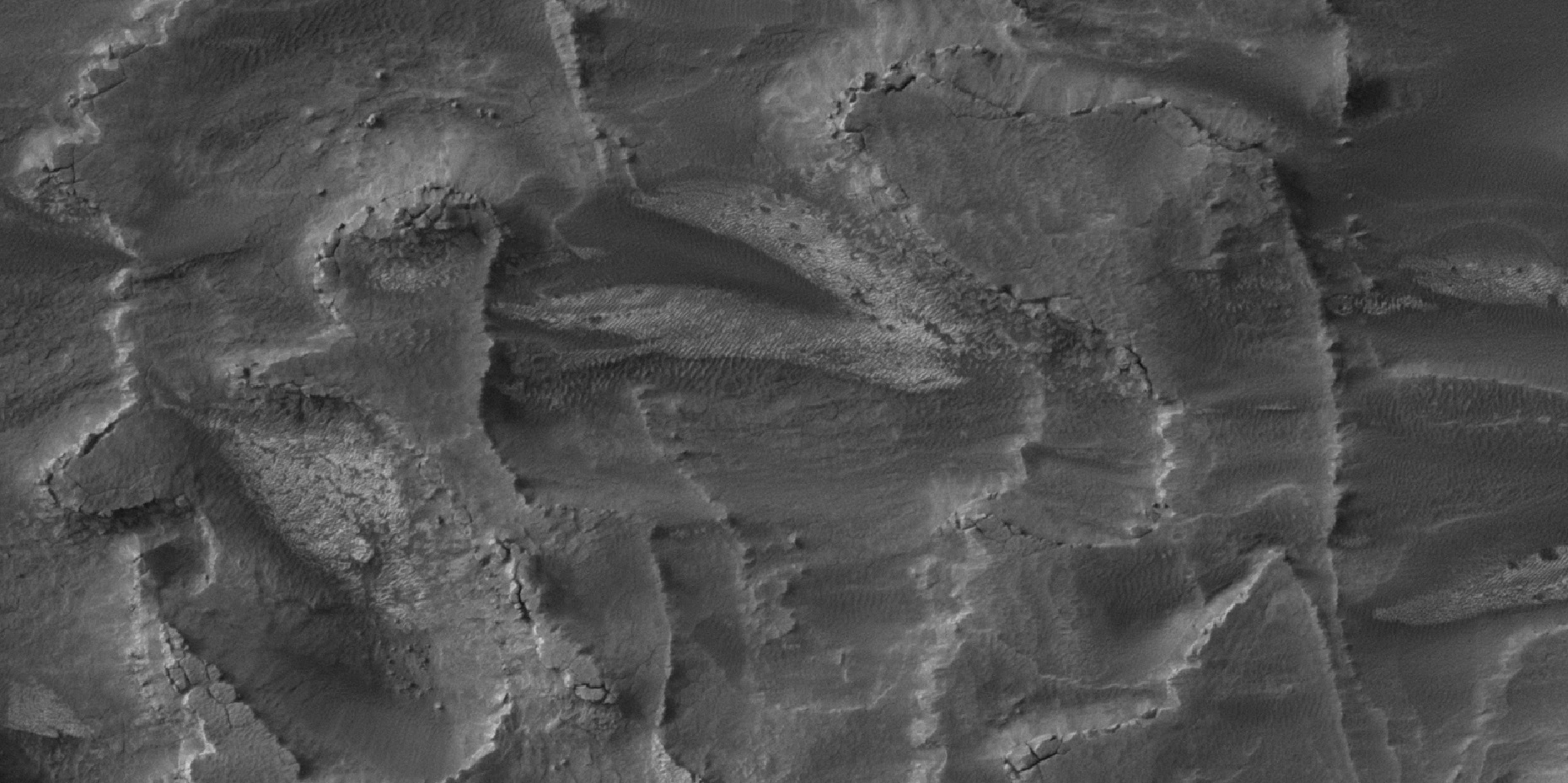
Layers breaking up into boulders in Galle crater, as seen by HiRISE under HiWish program

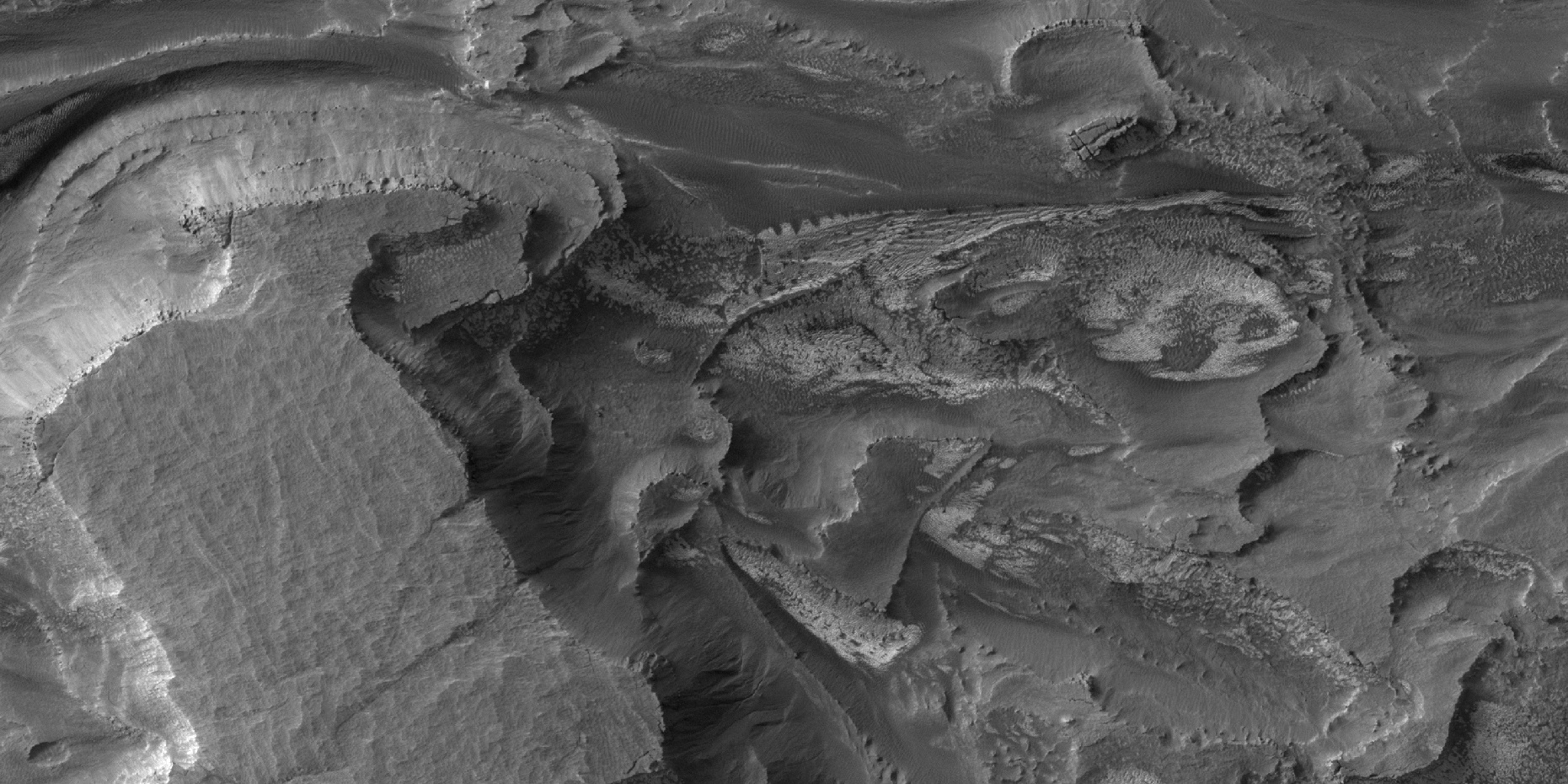
Layers and gullies in Galle crater, as seen by HiRISE under HiWish program

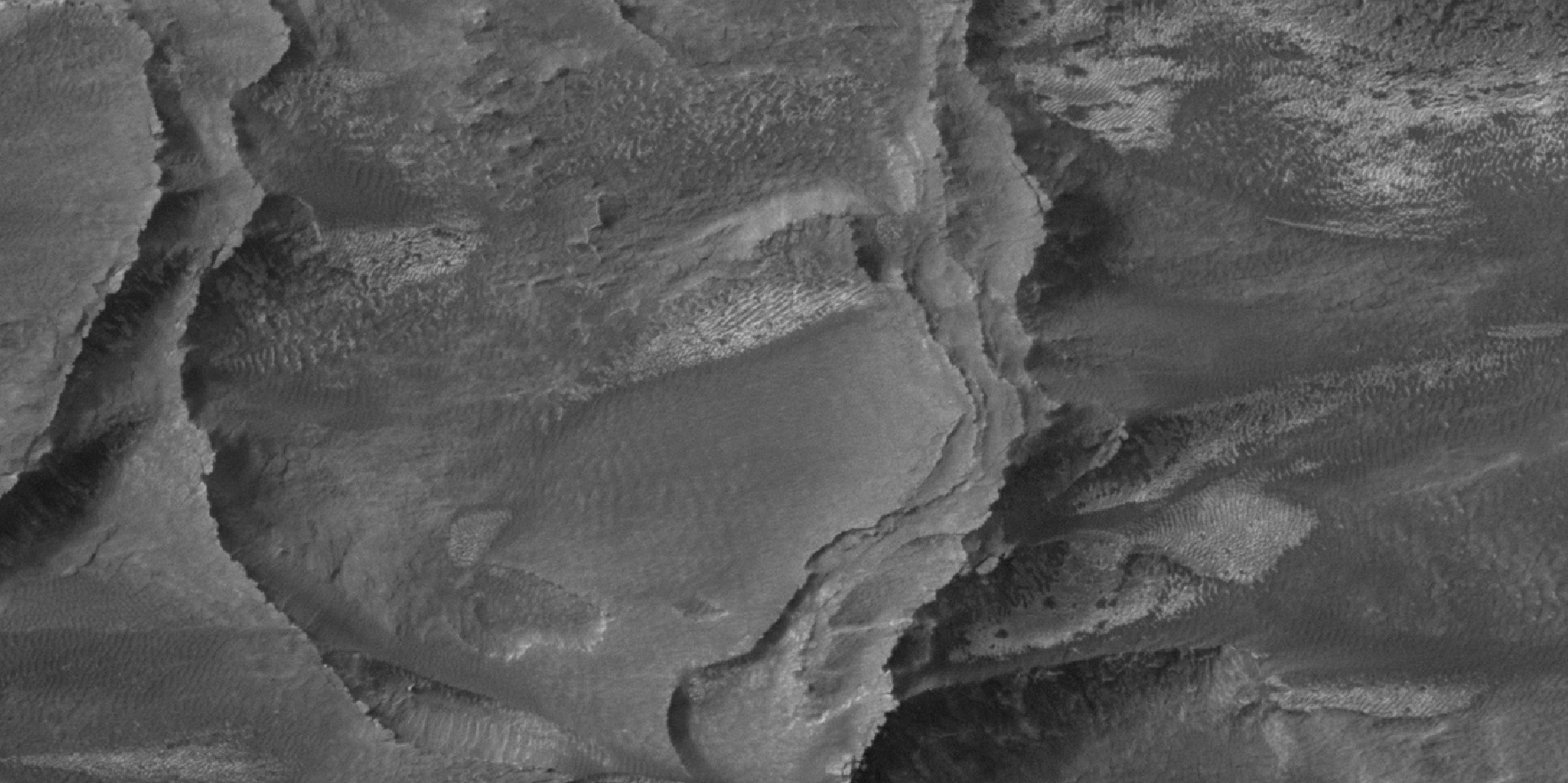
Close view of layers in mound in Galle crater, as seen by HiRISE under HiWish program

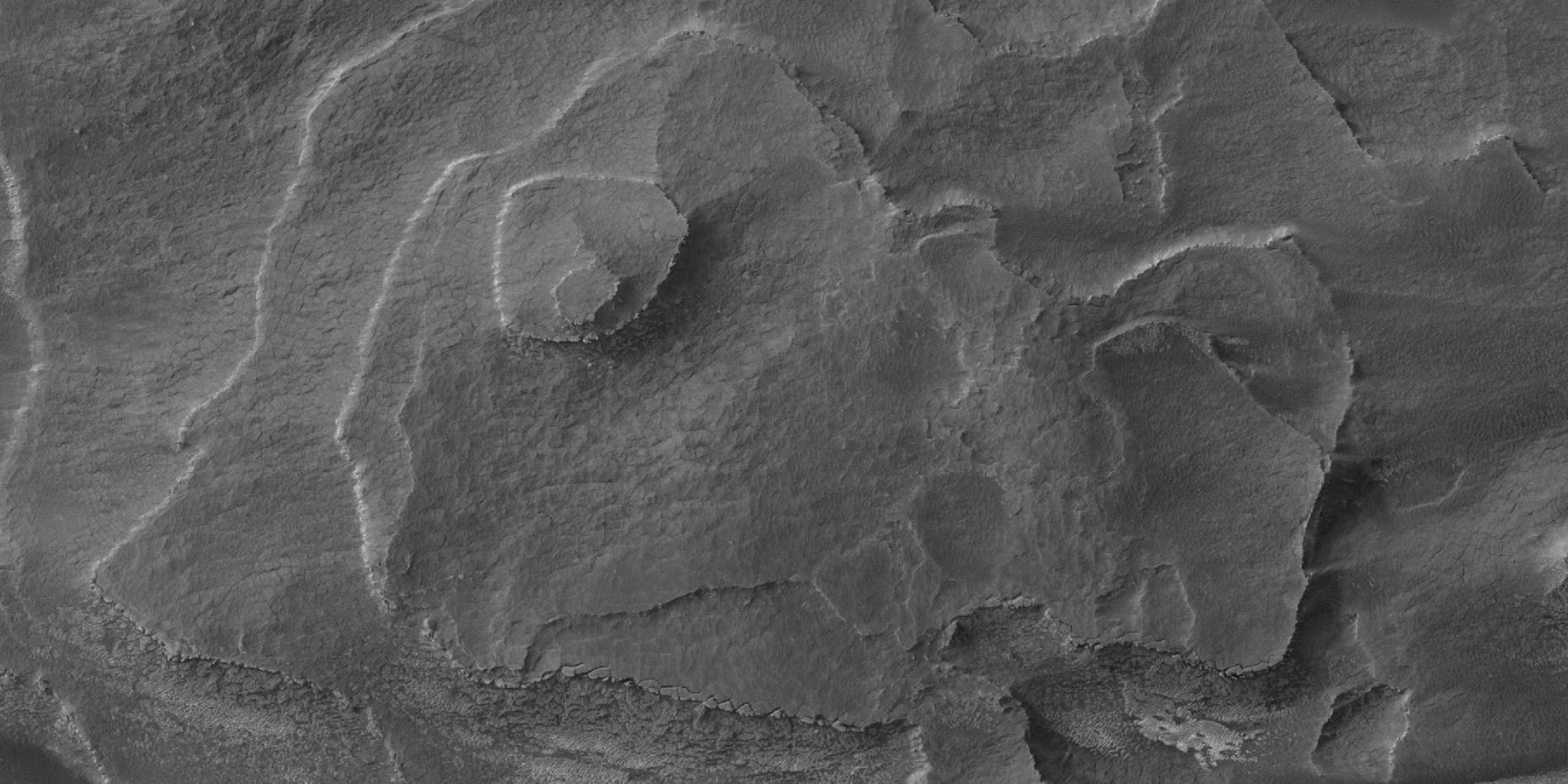
Layered mesa in mound in Galle crater, as seen by HiRISE under HiWish program

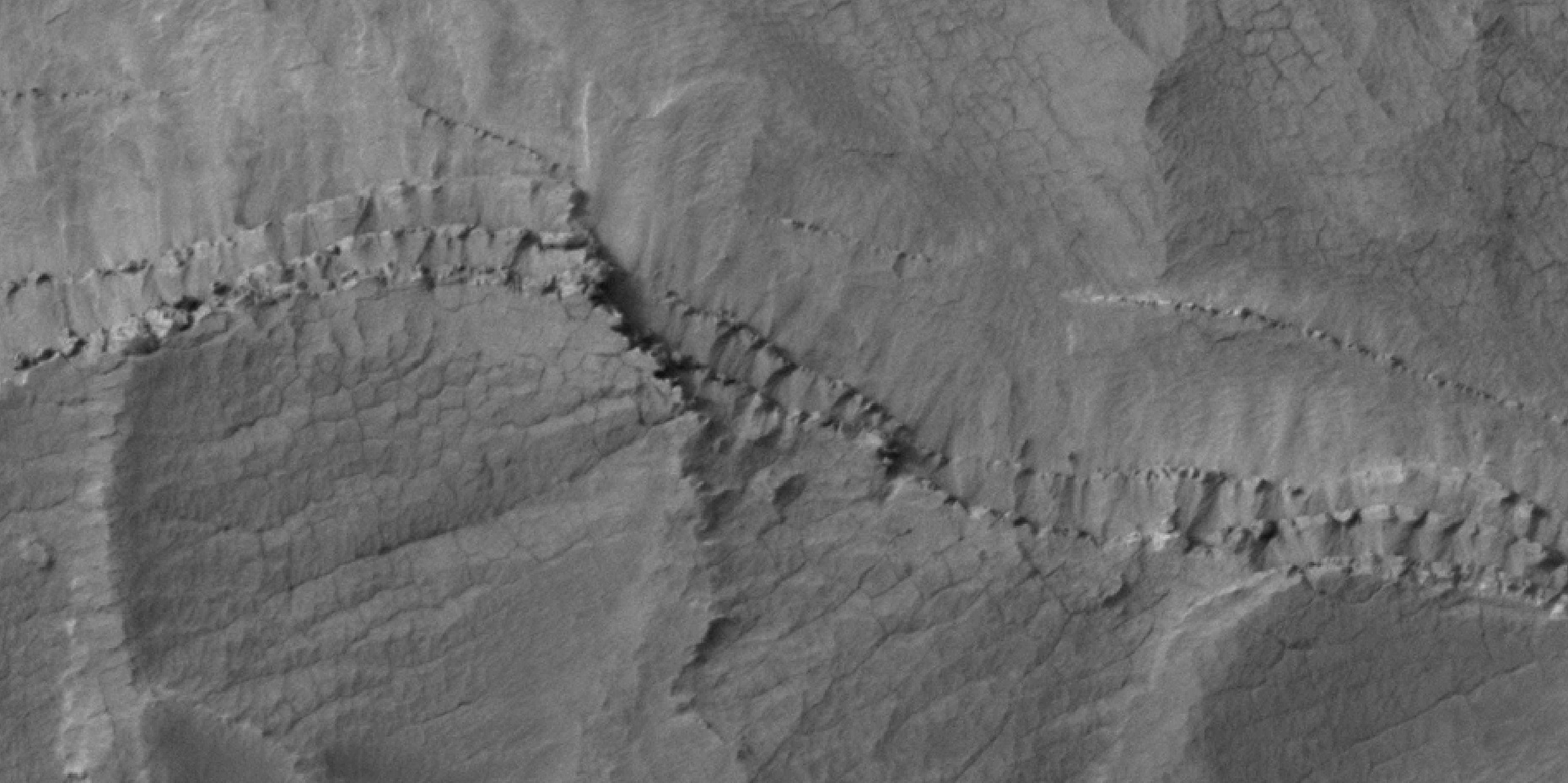
Layers and polygons in mound in Galle crater, as seen by HiRISE under HiWish program

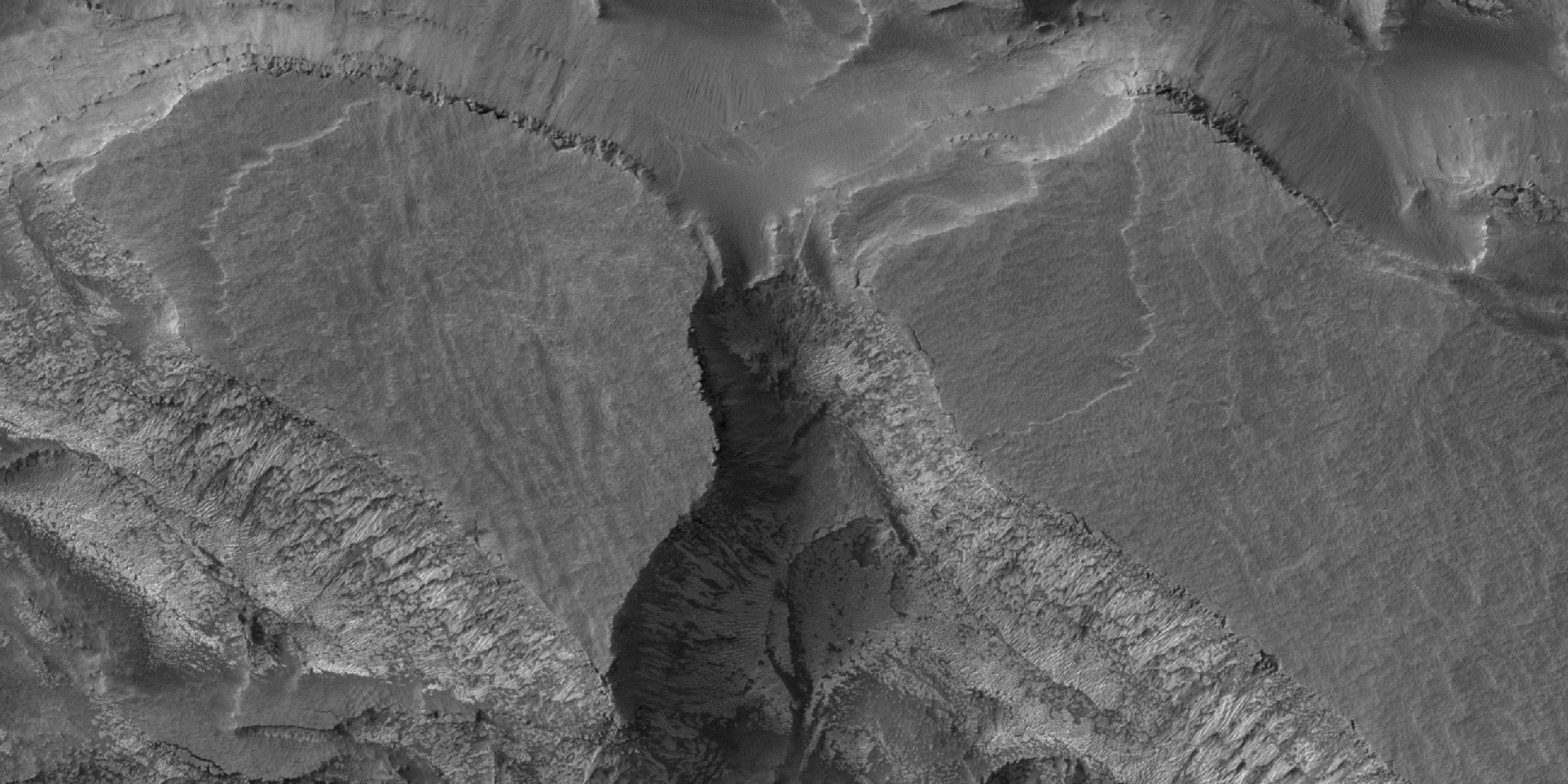
Close view of layers in mound in Galle crater, as seen by HiRISE under HiWish program

== See also ==
- "The Face on Mars"
- Galle (lunar crater)
- List of craters on Mars
