= Charitum Montes =

Large group of mountains in the Argyre quadrangle of Mars

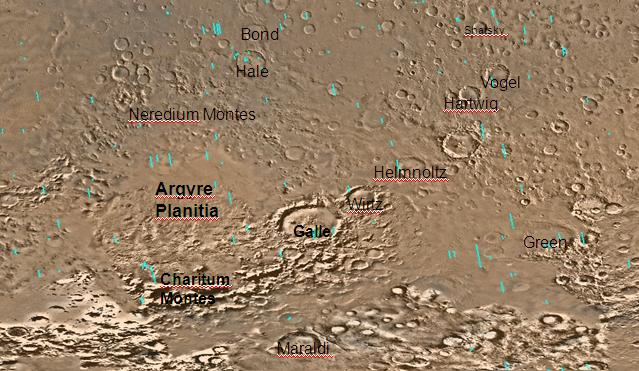
- Map of Argyre quadrangle with major features labeled.
- Feature type: Mountain range
- Location: Argyre quadrangle
- Coordinates: 58.4°S 40.29°W
- Length: 850 km

Charitum Montes is a large group of mountains in the Argyre quadrangle of Mars, located at 58.4° south latitude and 40.29° west longitude. It is 850 km across and was named after a classical albedo feature name. Charitum Montes has gullies in some areas.

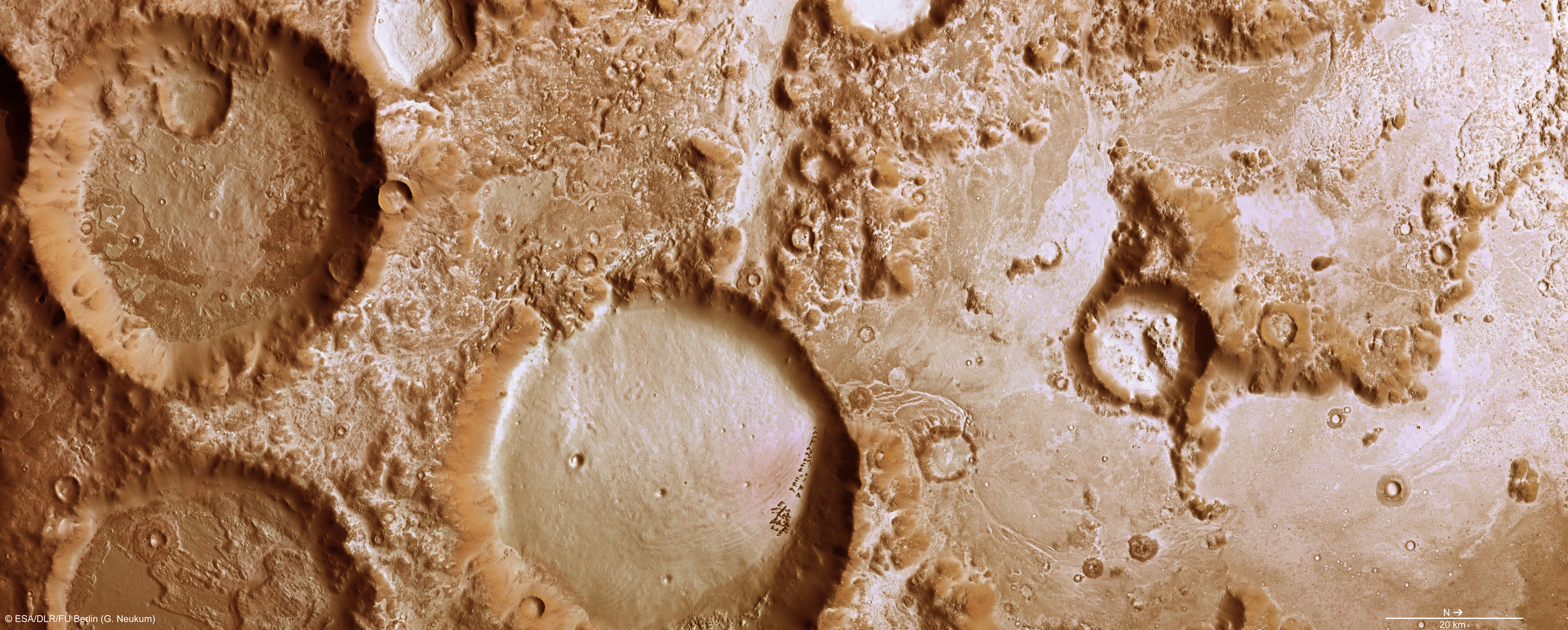
Charitum Montes, a cratered winter wonderland from the ESA's Mars Express's HRSC camera

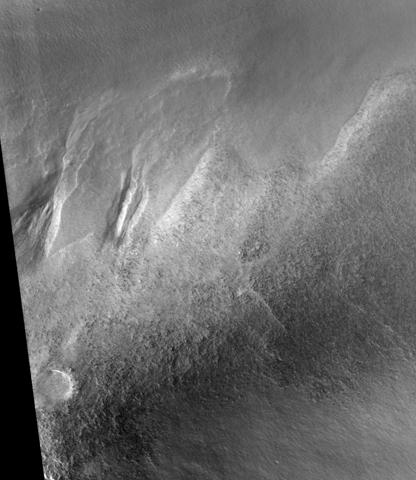
Charitum Montes Gullies, as seen by HiRISE
