= Galle (lunar crater) =

Crater on the Moon

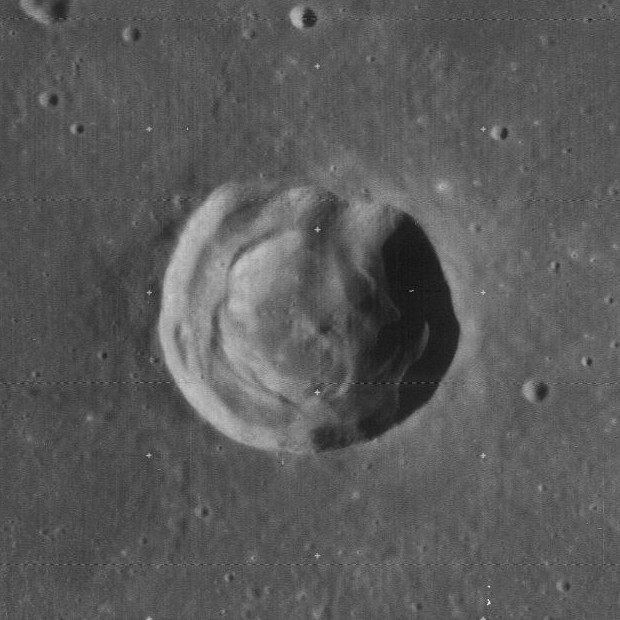
- Lunar Orbiter 4 image
- Coordinates: 55.9°N 22.3°E
- Diameter: 20.96 km (13.02 mi)
- Depth: 2.3 km (1.4 mi)
- Colongitude: 338° at sunrise
- Eponym: Johann G. Galle

Galle is a small lunar impact crater on the Mare Frigoris, to the north-northeast of the prominent crater Aristoteles. The formation is nearly circular, with a sharp-edged rim and little appearance of degredation. There are slight outward bulges in the rim to the north and northeast, but otherwise the formation is relatively symmetrical.

This feature is named after German astronomer Johann Gottfried Galle (1812-1910). His name was included in the lunar nomenclature of German astronomer J. F. Julius Schmidt during the 19th century. Its designation was formally adopted by the International Astronomical Union in 1935.

== Satellite craters ==
By convention, these features are identified on lunar maps by placing the letter on the side of the crater midpoint that is closest to Galle.

Galle	Latitude	Longitude	Diameter
A	53.9° N	22.3° E	6 km
B	55.4° N	17.4° E	7 km
C	57.8° N	24.5° E	11 km

== See also ==
- Galle (Martian crater)
