= Johann Gottfried Galle =

German astronomer (1812–1910)

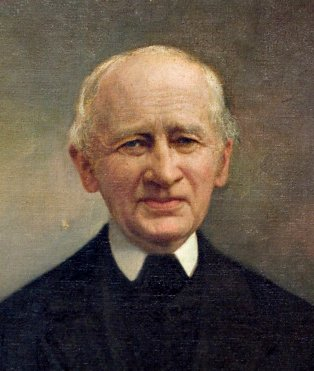
- Born: 9 June 1812; Radis, Kingdom of Prussia
- Died: 10 July 1910 (aged 98); Potsdam, German Empire
- Education: University of Berlin
- Known for: Discovery of Neptune
- Awards: Lalande Prize (1839)
- Scientific career
- Fields: Astronomy
- Workplaces: Berlin Observatory; University of Breslau

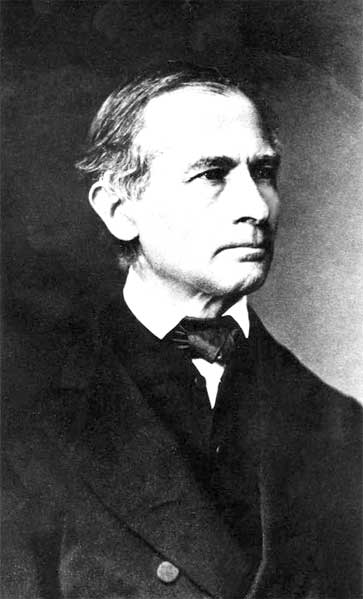
Johann Gottfried Galle, 1880

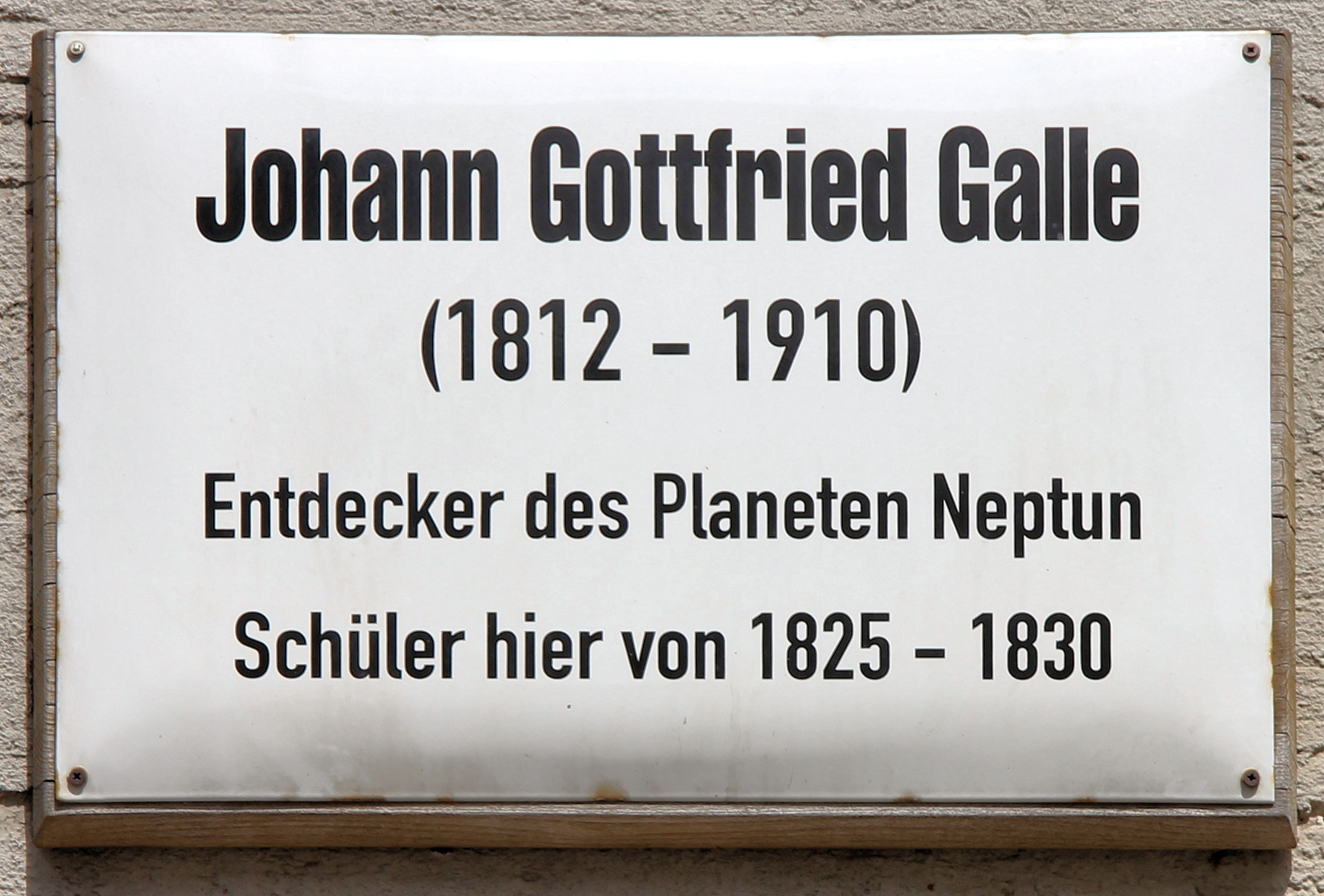
Memorial plaque in Wittenberg

Johann Gottfried Galle (9 June 1812 – 10 July 1910) was a German astronomer from Radis, Germany, at the Berlin Observatory who, on 23 September 1846, with the assistance of student Heinrich Louis d'Arrest, was the first person to view and identify the planet Neptune. Urbain Le Verrier had predicted the existence and position of Neptune, and sent the coordinates to Galle, asking him to verify. Galle found Neptune in the same night he received Le Verrier's letter, within 1° of the predicted position. The discovery of Neptune is widely regarded as a dramatic validation of celestial mechanics, and is one of the most remarkable moments of 19th-century science.

== Early life ==
Galle was born in the Papsthaus (a house in the Pabst wood) 2 km west of Radis in the vicinity of the town of Gräfenhainichen, as the first son of Marie Henriette née Pannier (1790–1839) and Johann Gottfried Galle (1790–1853), an operator of a tar oven. He attended the Gymnasium in Wittenberg and studied at Friedrich-Wilhelms-Universität Berlin from 1830 to 1833. He became a teacher at the Gymnasium in Guben, teaching mathematics and physics. Later on, he transferred to the Gymnasium in Berlin.

== Berlin Observatory ==
He had started to work as an assistant to Johann Franz Encke in 1835 immediately following the completion of the new Berlin Observatory. Galle worked there for the next 16 years, making use especially of a Fraunhofer-refractor with 9 Zoll (~22.5 cm) aperture. In 1838 he discovered an inner, dark ring of Saturn. From 2 December 1839 to 6 March 1840 he discovered three new comets.

In 1845 Galle was awarded a Dr. phil. His doctoral thesis was a reduction and critical discussion of Ole Rømer's observation of meridian transits of stars and planets on the days from 20 October to 23 October 1706.

=== Discovery of Neptune ===
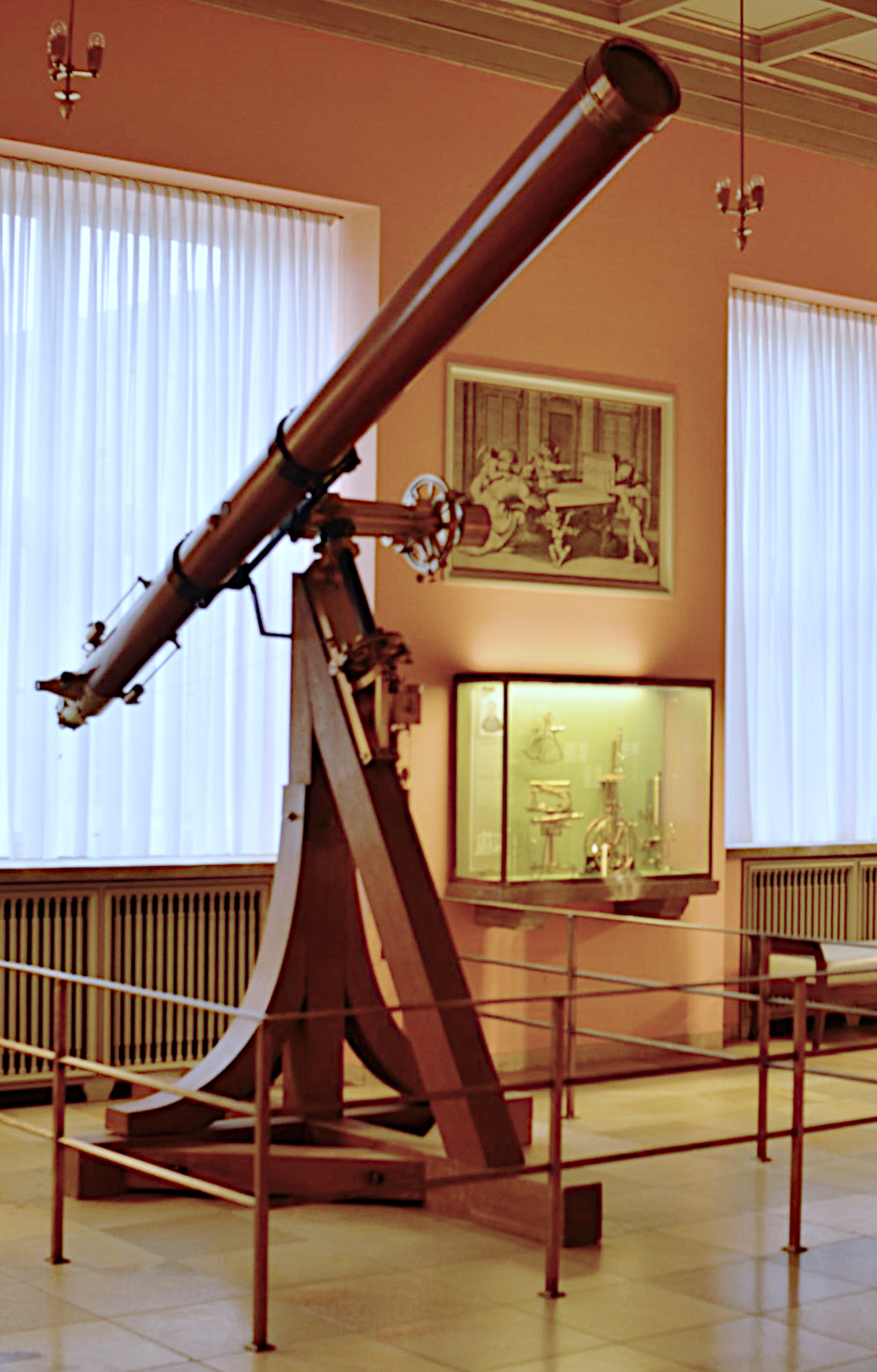
The 9" refractor telescope which Galle used to discover Neptune

Around the same time in 1845 he sent a copy of his thesis to Urbain Le Verrier, but only received an answer a year later. Sent on 18 September 1846, it reached Galle on the morning of 23 September. Le Verrier had been investigating the perturbations of the orbit of the planet Uranus and from this he derived the position of a still undiscovered planet, and requested Galle to search in the corresponding section of sky. The very same night (after Encke gave permission to search, against his own judgement), in collaboration with his assistant Heinrich Louis d'Arrest, Galle discovered a star of 8th magnitude, only 1° away from the calculated position, which was not recorded in the Berliner Akademischen Sternkarte. Over the next two evenings, a proper motion of the celestial object of 4 seconds of arc was measured, which determined it absolutely as a planet, for which Le Verrier proposed the name Neptune. Galle always refused to be acknowledged as the discoverer of Neptune; he attributed the discovery to Le Verrier.

In 1847 Galle was designated as the successor to Friedrich Wilhelm Bessel as Director of Königsberg Observatory. Before the enacted nomination from Friedrich Wilhelm IV effected de facto, Galle withdrew his application at the beginning of 1848 due to an intrigue against him led by Carl Gustav Jacob Jacobi.

== Breslau Observatory ==
In 1851 he moved to Breslau (today Wrocław) to become the director of the local observatory, and in 1856 he became Professor of Astronomy at the Schlesischen Friedrich-Wilhelms-Universität Breslau. He worked in Breslau for over 45 years. For the academic year 1875/76 he was elected Rector. At Breslau he dealt with the exact determination of planetary orbits and developed methods for calculating the height of the aurorae and the path of meteors, and consolidated the data for all 414 comets discovered up to 1894 into one work (with the help of his son). Otherwise he concerned himself with the Earth's magnetic field and climatology. Altogether he published over 200 works.

== Later years ==
In 1897 Galle returned to Potsdam, where he died in 1910 at the age of 98. He was survived by his wife and two sons, Andreas Galle and Georg Galle (1860–1946).

The town of Gräfenhainichen, which is close to his birthplace, erected a memorial to him in 1977.

Two craters, one on the Moon and the "happy face" one on Mars, the asteroid 2097 Galle, and a ring of Neptune have been named in his honor.

In Breslau (today Wrocław) itself, Galle was commemorated by naming one of the streets with his last name – Gallestrasse. This name was in force until the end of World War II. Its contemporary name is Wapienna (meaning limestone in Polish) Street.
