= Argyre quadrangle =

Map of Mars

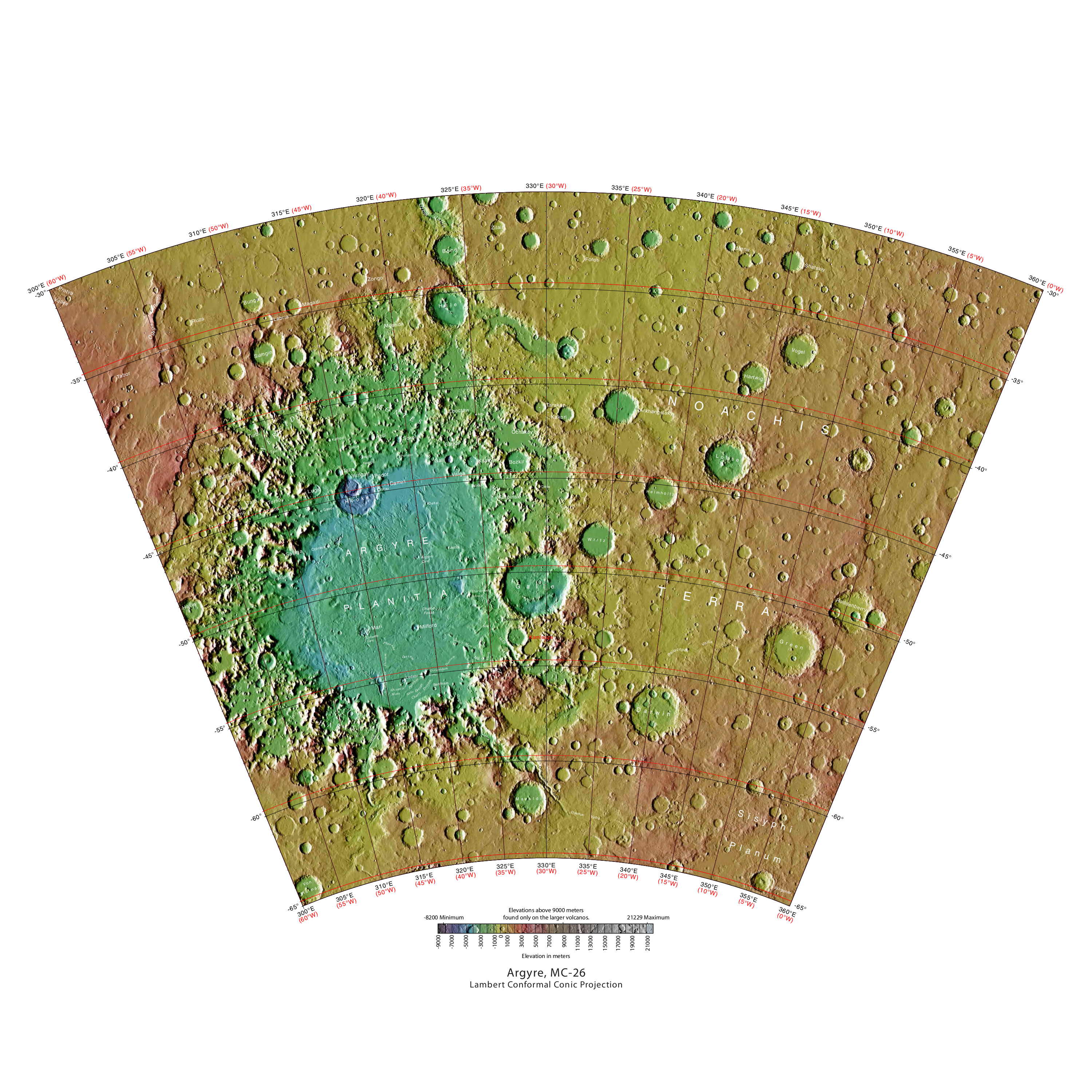
- Map of Argyre quadrangle from Mars Orbiter Laser Altimeter (MOLA) data. The highest elevations are red and the lowest are blue.
- Coordinates: 47.5°S 30°W

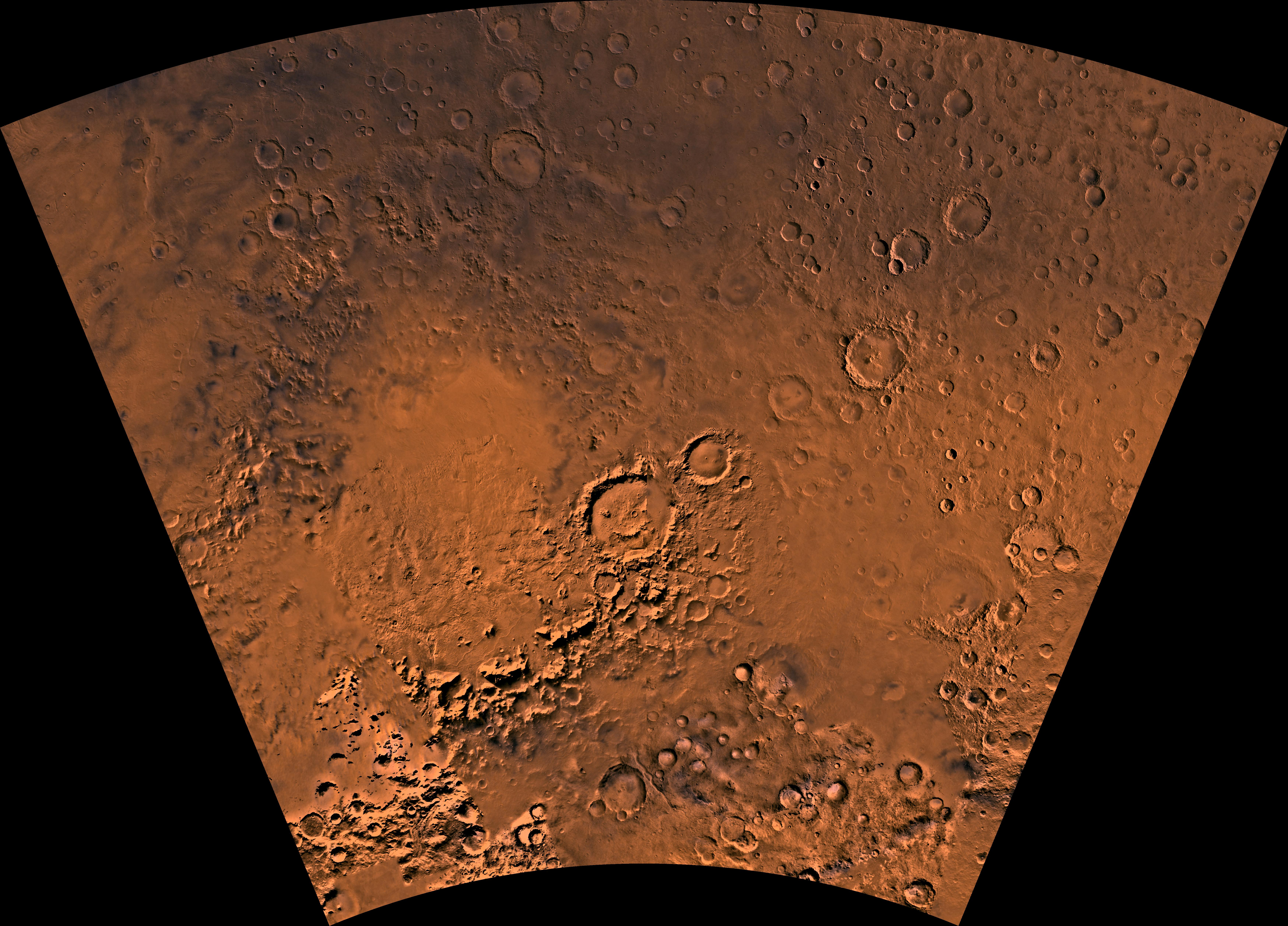
Image of the Argyre Quadrangle (MC-26). The west-central part contains the Argyre basin, defined by a rim of rugged mountain blocks that surrounds a nearly circular expanse of light-colored plains. The large basin is surrounded by heavily cratered highlands.

The Argyre quadrangle is one of a series of 30 quadrangle maps of Mars used by the United States Geological Survey (USGS) Astrogeology Research Program. The Argyre quadrangle is also referred to as MC-26 (Mars Chart-26). It contains Argyre Planitia and part of Noachis Terra.

== Name ==
The word Argyre is named after a legendary silver at the mouth of the Ganges--[Arakan, Berma.

The Argyre quadrangle covers the area from 0° to 60° west longitude and from 30° to 65° south latitude on Mars. It contains Galle crater, which resembles a smiley face and the Argyre basin, a giant impact crater. Research published in the journal Icarus has found pits in Hale Crater that are caused by hot ejecta falling on ground containing ice. The pits are formed by heat forming steam that rushes out from groups of pits simultaneously, thereby blowing away from the pit ejecta. Many steep slopes in this quadrangle contain gullies, which are believed to have formed by relatively recent flows of water.

== Martian gullies ==
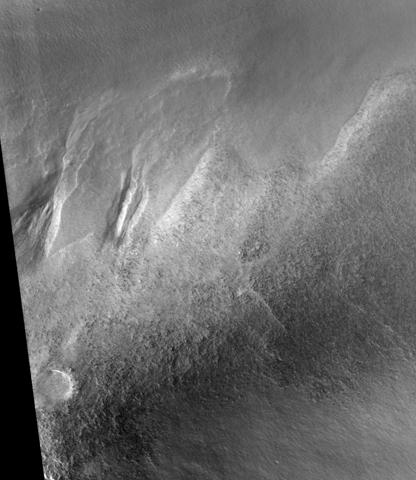
Charitum Montes Gullies, as seen by HiRISE

Gullies are common in some latitude bands on Mars. Usually, martian gullies are found on the walls of craters or troughs, but Charitum Montes, a group of mountains, has gullies in some areas (see the image below).

Gullies occur on steep slopes, especially on the walls of craters. Gullies are believed to be relatively young because they have few, if any craters. Moreover, they lie on top of sand dunes which themselves are considered to be quite young. Usually, each gully has an alcove, channel, and apron. Some studies have found that gullies occur on slopes that face all directions, others have found that the greater number of gullies are found on poleward facing slopes, especially from 30 to 44 S.

Although many ideas have been put forward to explain them, the most popular involve liquid water coming from an aquifer, from melting at the base of old glaciers, or from the melting of ice in the ground when the climate was warmer. Because of the good possibility that liquid water was involved with their formation and that they could be very young, scientists are excited. Maybe the gullies are where we should go to find life.

There is evidence for all three theories. Most of the gully alcove heads occur at the same level, just as one would expect of an aquifer. Various measurements and calculations show that liquid water could exist in aquifers at the usual depths where gullies begin. One variation of this model is that rising hot magma could have melted ice in the ground and caused water to flow in aquifers. Aquifers are layer that allow water to flow. They may consist of porous sandstone. The aquifer layer would be perched on top of another layer that prevents water from going down (in geological terms it would be called impermeable). Because water in an aquifer is prevented from going down, the only direction the trapped water can flow is horizontally. Eventually, water could flow out onto the surface when the aquifer reaches a break—like a crater wall. The resulting flow of water could erode the wall to create gullies. Aquifers are quite common on Earth. A good example is "Weeping Rock" in Zion National Park, Utah.

As for the next theory, much of the surface of Mars is covered by a thick smooth mantle that is thought to be a mixture of ice and dust. This ice-rich mantle, a few yards thick, smooths the land, but in places it has a bumpy texture, resembling the surface of a basketball. The mantle may be like a glacier and under certain conditions the ice that is mixed in the mantle could melt and flow down the slopes and make gullies. Because there are few craters on this mantle, the mantle is relatively young. An excellent view of this mantle is shown below in the picture of the Ptolemaeus Crater Rim, as seen by HiRISE. The ice-rich mantle may be the result of climate changes. Changes in Mars's orbit and tilt cause significant changes in the distribution of water ice from polar regions down to latitudes equivalent to Texas. During certain climate periods water vapor leaves polar ice and enters the atmosphere. The water comes back to ground at lower latitudes as deposits of frost or snow mixed generously with dust. The atmosphere of Mars contains a great deal of fine dust particles. Water vapor will condense on the particles, then fall down to the ground due to the additional weight of the water coating. When Mars is at its greatest tilt or obliquity, up to 2 cm of ice could be removed from the summer ice cap and deposited at midlatitudes. This movement of water could last for several thousand years and create a snow layer of up to around 10 meters thick. When ice at the top of the mantling layer goes back into the atmosphere, it leaves behind dust, which insulating the remaining ice. Measurements of altitudes and slopes of gullies support the idea that snowpacks or glaciers are associated with gullies. Steeper slopes have more shade which would preserve snow. Higher elevations have far fewer gullies because ice would tend to sublimate more in the thin air of the higher altitude.

The third theory might be possible since climate changes may be enough to simply allow ice in the ground to melt and thus form the gullies. During a warmer climate, the first few meters of ground could thaw and produce a "debris flow" similar to those on the dry and cold Greenland east coast. Since the gullies occur on steep slopes only a small decrease of the shear strength of the soil particles is needed to begin the flow. Small amounts of liquid water from melted ground ice could be enough. Calculations show that a third of a mm of runoff can be produced each day for 50 days of each Martian year, even under current conditions.

== Argyre basin ==
The Argyre basin was created by a giant impact that occurred 70 million years after the Hellas impact. It is believed to have contained a lake early in the history of Mars. At least three river valleys (Surius Vallis, Dzigal Vallis, and Palacopus Vallis) drain into it from the south. After it froze solid, the ice formed eskers which are visible today. An article written by 22 researchers in Icarus concluded that the impact that formed the Argyre basin probably stuck an ice cap or a thick permafrost layer. Energy from the impact melted the ice and formed a giant lake that eventually sent water to the North. The lakes's volume was equal to that of Earth's Mediterranean Sea. The deepest part of the lake may have taken more than a hundred thousand years to freeze, but with the help of heat from the impact, geothermal heating, and dissolved solutes it may have had liquid water for many millions of years. Life may have developed in this time. This region shows a great deal of evidence of glacial activity with flow features, crevasse-like fractures, drumlins, eskers, tarns, aretes, cirques, horns, U-shaped valleys, and terraces. Because of the shapes of Argyre sinuous ridges, the authors concluded that they are eskers. Studies with advanced cameras, such as CTX, and MRO High Resolution Imaging Science Experiment (HiRISE) suggests that these ridges are probably eskers.

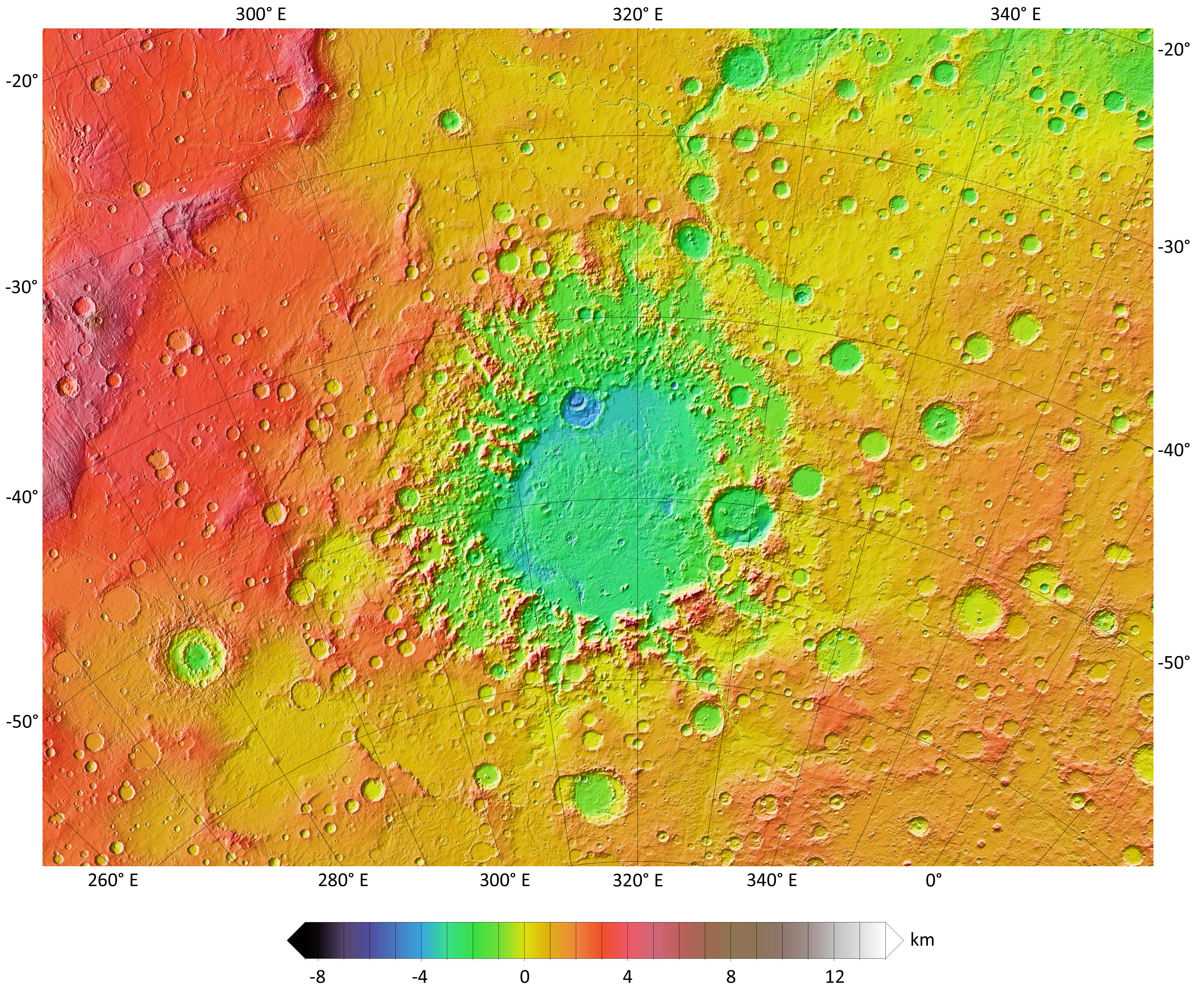
Topography of the Argyre basin, the major feature in the Argyre quadrangle

== Layers ==
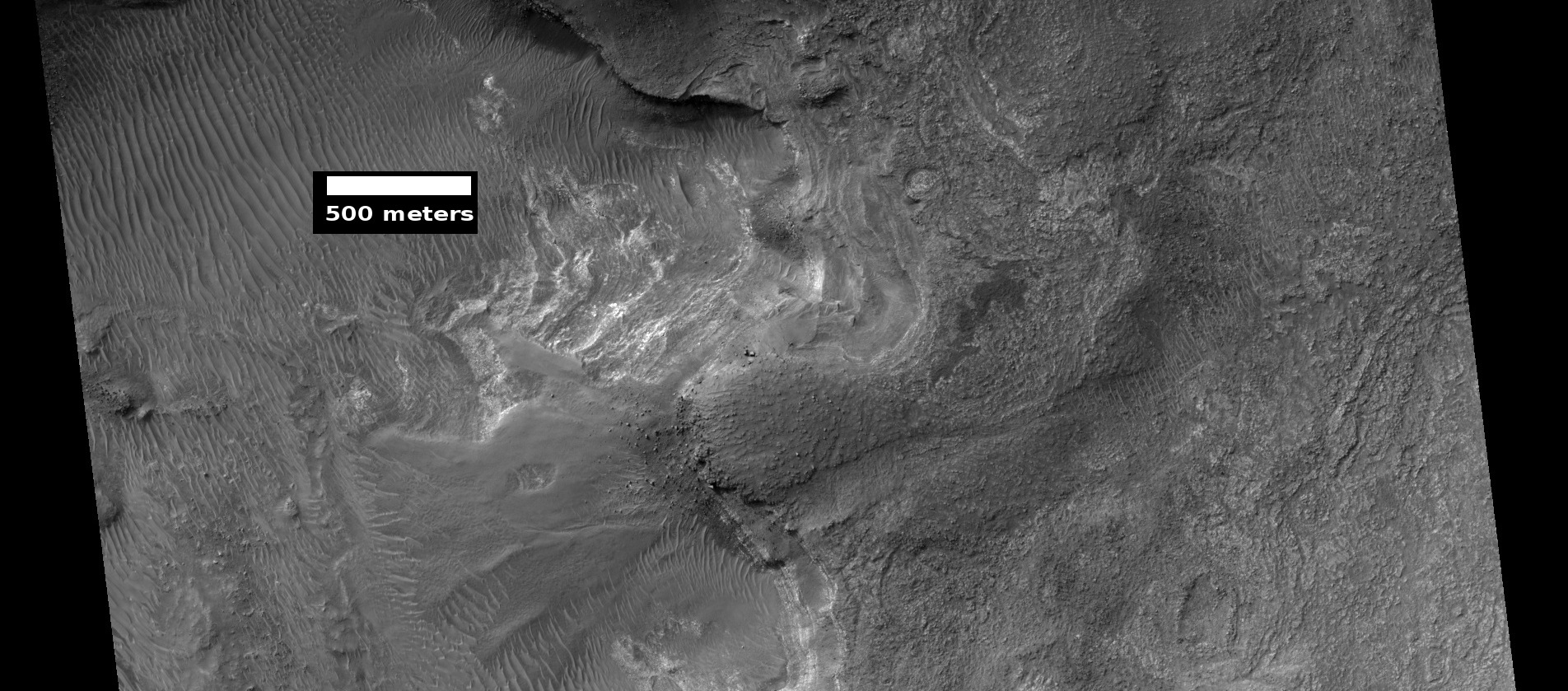
Layers exposed in Nereidum Montes, as seen by HiRISE under HiWish program The light-toned layers may contain sulfates which are good for preserving traces of ancient life.

Layers may be formed by groundwater rising up depositing minerals and cementing sediments. The hardened layers are consequently more protected from erosion. This process may occur instead of layers forming under lakes. Some locations on the Red Planet show groups of layered rocks. In some places the layers are arranged into regular patterns. It has been suggested that the layers were put into place by volcanoes, the wind, or by being at the bottom of a lake or sea. Calculations and simulations show that groundwater carrying dissolved minerals would surface in the same locations that have abundant rock layers. According to these ideas, deep canyons and large craters would receive water coming from the ground. Many craters in the Arabia area of Mars contain groups of layers. Some of these layers may have resulted from climate change.

The tilt of the rotational axis of Mars has repeatedly changed in the past. Some changes are large. Because of these variations of climate, at times the atmosphere of Mars would have been much thicker and contained more moisture. The amount of atmospheric dust also has increased and decreased. It is believed that these frequent changes helped to deposit material in craters and other low places. The rising of mineral-rich ground water cemented these materials. The model also predicts that after a crater is full of layered rocks, additional layers will be laid down in the area around the crater. So, the model predicts that layers may also have formed in intercrater regions; layers in these regions have been observed.

Layers can be hardened by the action of groundwater. Martian ground water probably moved hundreds of kilometers, and in the process it dissolved many minerals from the rock it passed through. When ground water surfaces in low areas containing sediments, water evaporates in the thin atmosphere and leaves behind minerals as deposits and/or cementing agents. Consequently, layers of dust could not later easily erode away since they were cemented together. On Earth, mineral-rich waters often evaporate forming large deposits of various types of salts and other minerals. Sometimes water flows through Earth's aquifers, and then evaporates at the surface just as is hypothesized for Mars. One location this occurs on Earth is the Great Artesian Basin of Australia. On Earth the hardness of many sedimentary rocks, like sandstone, is largely due to the cement that was put in place as water passed through.

== Channels ==
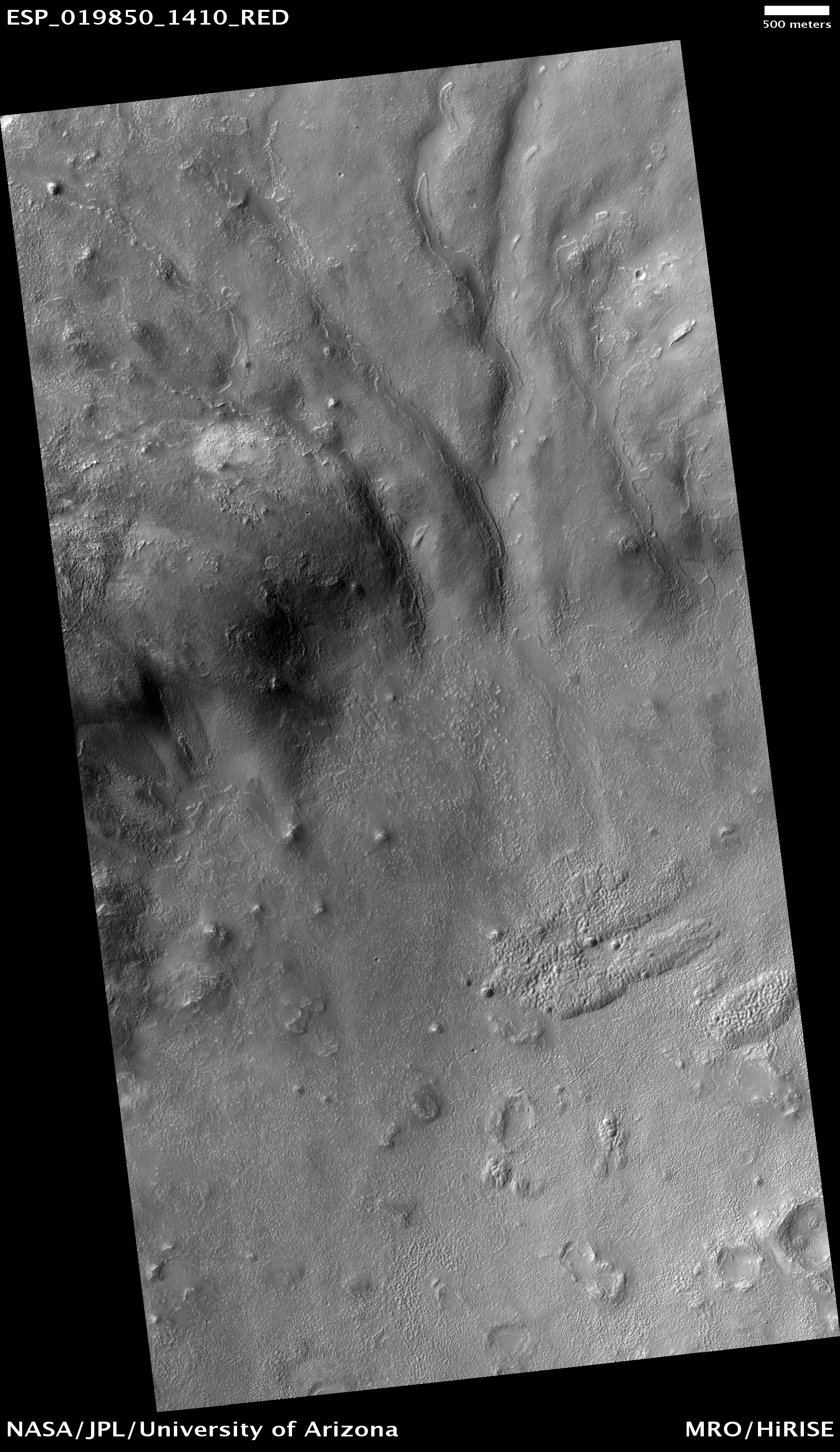
Channels in Argyre quadrangle as seen by HiRISE, under the HiWish program. This is the image of the surface from a single HiRISE image. The scale bar at the top is 500 meters long.

There is enormous evidence that water once flowed in river valleys on Mars. Images of curved channels have been seen in images from Mars spacecraft dating back to the early 1970s with the Mariner 9 orbiter. Indeed, a study published in June 2017, calculated that the volume of water needed to carve all the channels on Mars was even larger than the proposed ocean that the planet may have had. Water was probably recycled many times from the ocean to rainfall around Mars. Many places on Mars show channels of different sizes. Many of these channels probably carried water, at least for a time. The climate of Mars may have been such in the past that water ran on its surface. It has been known for some time that Mars undergoes many large changes in its tilt or obliquity because its two small moons lack the gravity to stabilize it, as the Moon stabilizes Earth; at times the tilt of Mars has even been greater than 80 degrees

== See also ==
- Climate of Mars
- Dust Devil Tracks
- HiRISE
- HiWish
- Impact crater
- Lakes on Mars
- List of quadrangles on Mars
- Martian Gullies
- Ore resources on Mars
- Unconformity
- Water on Mars

MC-01 Mare Boreum (features)
MC-02 Diacria (features)		MC-03 Arcadia (features)	MC-04 Acidalium (features)	MC-05 Ismenius Lacus (features)		MC-06 Casius (features)	MC-07 Cebrenia (features)
MC-08 Amazonis (features)	MC-09 Tharsis (features)	MC-10 Lunae Palus (features)	MC-11 Oxia Palus (features)	MC-12 Arabia (features)	MC-13 Syrtis Major (features)	MC-14 Amenthes (features)	MC-15 Elysium (features)
MC-16 Memnonia (features)	MC-17 Phoenicis Lacus (features)	MC-18 Coprates (features)	MC-19 Margaritifer Sinus (features)	MC-20 Sinus Sabaeus (features)	MC-21 Iapygia (features)	MC-22 Mare Tyrrhenum (features)	MC-23 Aeolis (features)
MC-24 Phaethontis (features)		MC-25 Thaumasia (features)	MC-26 Argyre (features)	MC-27 Noachis (features)		MC-28 Hellas (features)	MC-29 Eridania (features)
MC-30 Mare Australe (features)
