= Nereidum Montes =

Montes on Mars

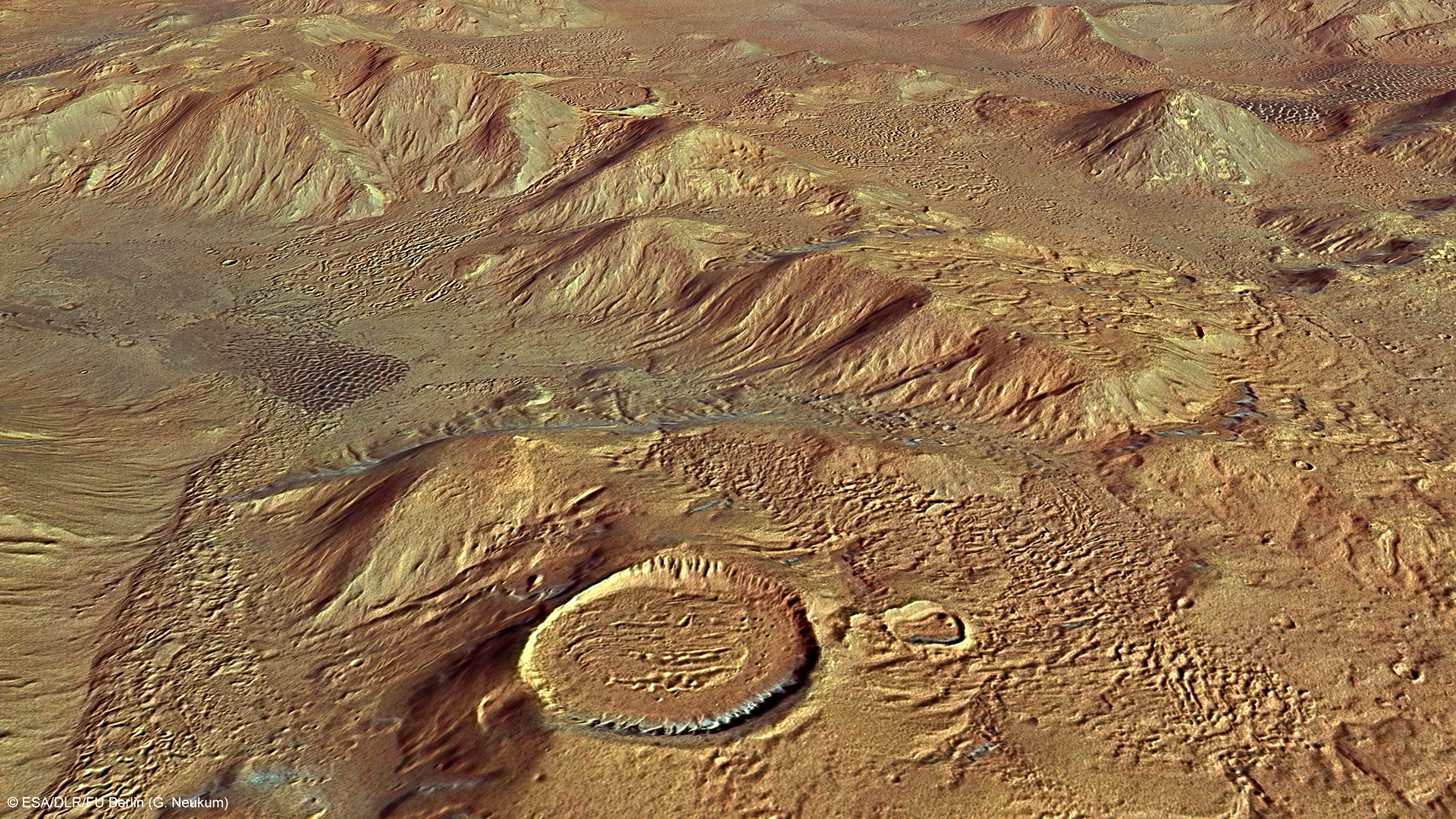
- Computer-generated perspective view of Nereidum Montes from the High-Resolution Stereo Camera (HRSC) on ESA's Mars Express.
- Location: Argyre quadrangle
- Coordinates: 37.57°S 43.21°W
- Length: 1,143 km
- Eponym: Classical albedo feature

The Nereidum Montes is a mountain range on Mars. It stretches 1,143 km, northeast of Argyre Planitia. It is in the Argyre quadrangle. The mountains are named after a Classical albedo feature. Nereidum Montes has gullies in some areas.

A hummocky relief resembling Veiki moraines has been found in Nereidum Montes. The relief is hypothesized to result, very much like Veiki moraines, from the melting of a Martian glacier.
