= Freital-Potschappel station =

Railway station in Freital, Germany

Freital-Potschappel
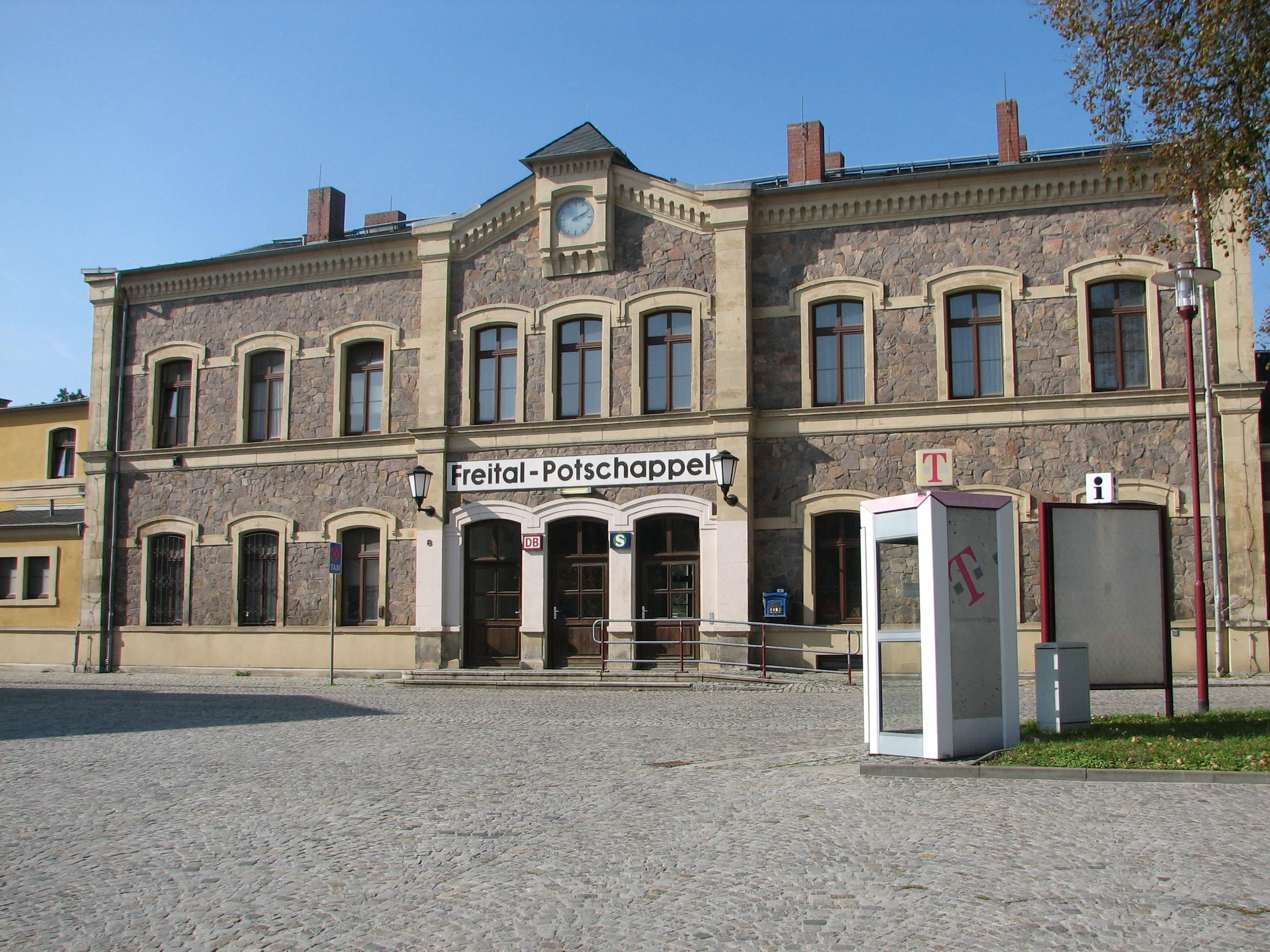
- Entrance building from the street side

General information
- Location: Am Bahnhof 8, 01705, Freital, Saxony; Germany
- Coordinates: 51°00′48″N 13°39′43″E
- Lines: Dresden–Werdau (km 6.84); Freital-Potschappel–Nossen (km 0.00; former); Potschappel–Hainsberg (km 0.00; former)
- Platforms: 2

Construction
- Accessible: Yes

Other information
- Station code: 1914
- DS100 code: DPA
- IBNR: 8013445
- Category: 5
- Website: www.bahnhof.de

History
- Opened: 28 June 1855

Services
Preceding station	Mitteldeutsche Regiobahn	Following station
Freital-Deuben towards Zwickau Hbf	RB 30	Dresden-Plauen towards Dresden Hbf
Preceding station	Dresden S-Bahn	Following station
Freital-Deuben towards Freiberg (Sachs)	S 3	Dresden-Plauen towards Dresden Hbf
Location
- Location within Saxony Location within Germany Location within Europe

Freital-Potschappel station is a station on the Dresden–Werdau railway in the district of Potschappel of the municipality of Freital in the German state of Saxony. From 1884 to 1972, the station was the starting point of the 750 mm gauge Freital-Potschappel–Nossen railway. Today, Freital-Potschappel serves in particular as an access point to line S3 of the Dresden S-Bahn.

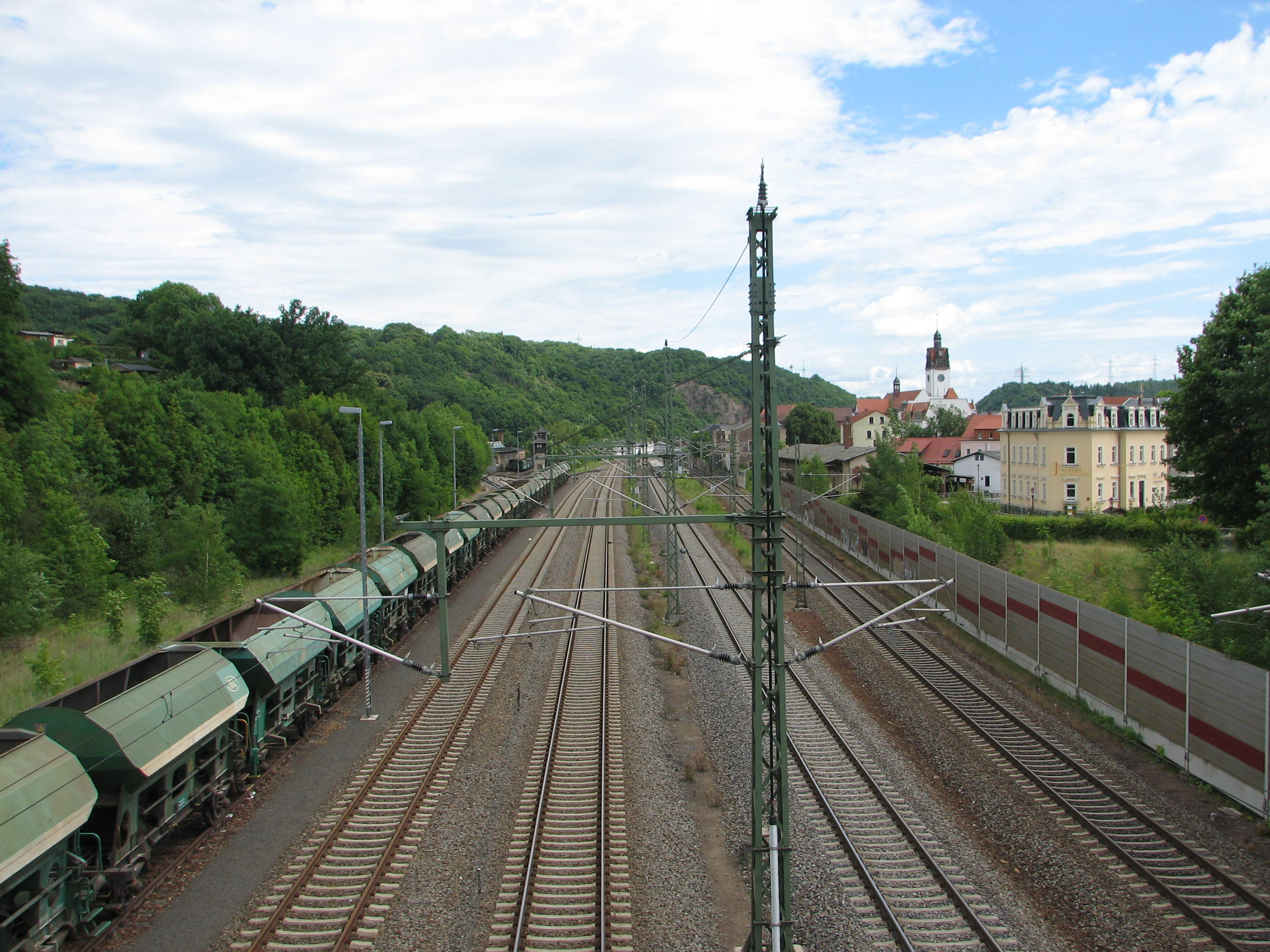
Looking towards Dresden with the station in the background

== History ==
Potschappel station was opened on 28 June 1855 with the inauguration of the two-track line of the Albertsbahn AG and now part of the Dresden–Werdau railway. The Albertsbahn (Albert’s Railway) was built with the aim of transporting hard coal mined in the Döhlen Basin (Döhlener Becken) to Dresden more quickly. Potschappel was an important location for the Saxon coal industry, so the opening of a railway station proved to be a good idea. A year later, on 1 December 1856, the Niederhermsdorfer Kohlezweigbahn (Niederhermsdorf coal branch railway) was opened to connect with the coal fields of the Königliche Steinkohlenwerk Zauckerode (Royal Zauckerode colliery). It branched off at Potschappel station in the area of the Dresden Porcelain factory (Sächsische Porzellanmanufaktur Dresden), crossed the street of Roßthalerstrasse (now Carl-Thieme-Strasse) and followed the course of Wiederitz to the village of Niederhermsdorf.

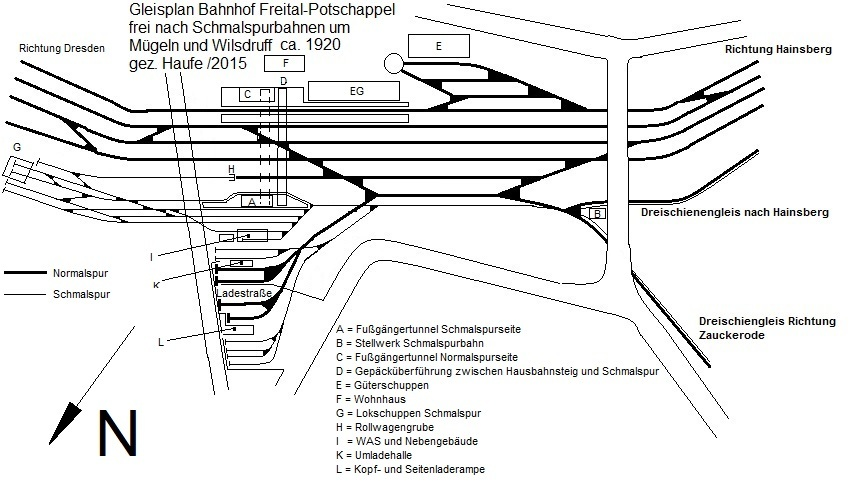
Track plan of Potschappel station in the 1920s

From 1856 to 1875, more than a million loads with 100 tons of coal each were handled in Potschappel. This meant that the 1860s the station was one of the most important stations for handling freight in Saxony. At the same time, the passenger traffic between Dresden and the growing industrial communities of the Döhlen Basin developed. In 1886, approximately 488,000 passengers were carried daily in 22 trains, and in 1897 twice as many trains each day handled over one million passengers.

In 1886, the Potschappel–Wilsdruff narrow-gauge railway was opened and provided further traffic. This line, which was extended to Nossen in 1889, was the first part of the system that developed into the Wilsdruff network (Wilsdruffer Netz). The narrow-gauge railway used the track bed of the Niederhermsdorf coal branch railway between Potschappel and Niederhermsdorf, a third rail only was inserted. The station infrastructure had already been expanded by the end of the 1870s.

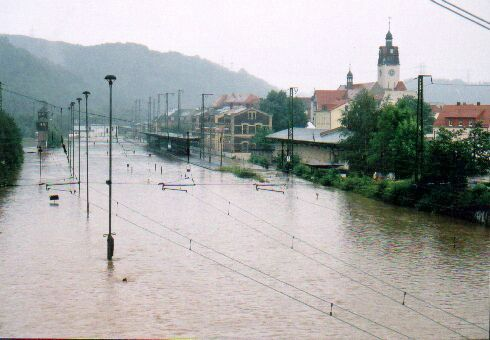
Freital Potschappel station during the flood of 2002

The resulting high traffic density on the railway congested and delayed traffic. The situation was further intensified with the start-up of the tramway through the Plauenscher Grund (the valley of the Weißeritz between Plauen and Freital) in 1902. The exit from Potschappel towards Dresden created a chokepoint, which could only be eased by the raising of the railway from 1905 to 1909. As a result of the upgrading, reconstruction work was also carried out at the entrance building erected in 1855. The railway was upgraded to four tracks, with work completed in 1914, allowing passenger and goods traffic to be handled separately at Potschappel station. During this time, signal box B1 was built, which is still preserved one and under heritage protection.

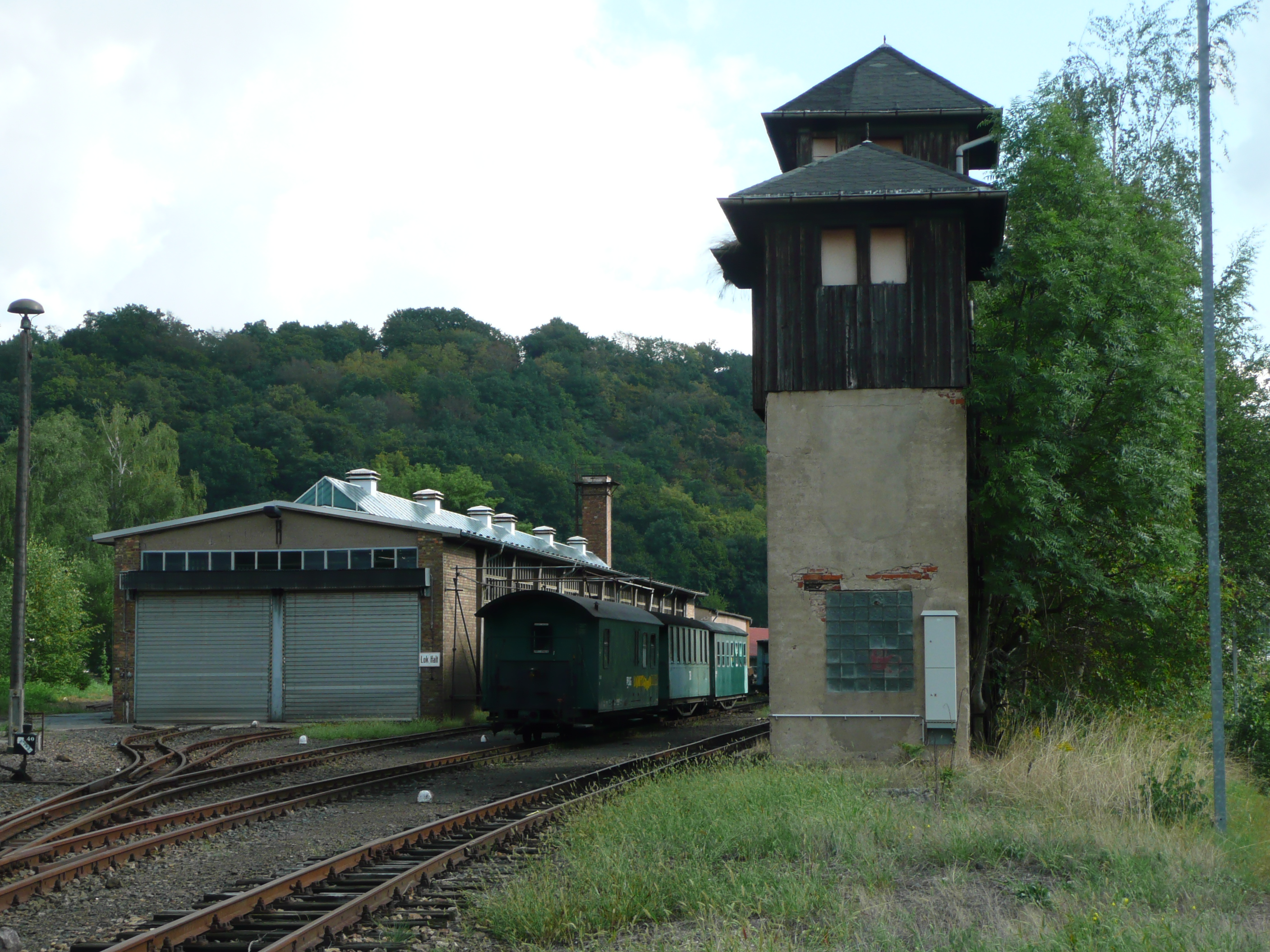
Narrow gauge precinct of the station in 2015

The introduction of a narrow-gauge link between Hainsberg and Potschappel was first considered in the 1900s. This would allow the exchange of locomotives between the Wilsdruff narrow-gauge network and the Weißeritz Valley Railway (Weißeritztalbahn), which starts in Hainsberg. It was also realised that it would be possible to have the Weißeritz Valley Railway start in Potschappel via this route. After the upgrading of the Dresden-Werdau railway, the Potschappel–Hainsberg connecting railway (Potschappel-Hainsberger Verbindungsbahn, PHV) was operational from September 1913 onwards; this included a section of industrial connecting line into which a third rail had been inserted. After that, the carriages of the Weißeritz Valley Railway were serviced in the carriage repair shop at the Potschappel narrow-gauge depot. Until the 1960s and again in the 1990s special excursions were offered over the Weißeritz Valley Railway from Potschappel via the PHV.

With the formation of the town of Freital from the municipalities of Deuben, Döhlen and Potschappel, Potschappel station was renamed Freital-Potschappel on 1 June 1921. A bomb dropped during the air raids on Dresden hit the station facilities on 16 April 1945.

The coal mining industry on the left (eastern) bank of the Weißeritz was completely abandoned at the end of the 1950s. Consequently, the sections of line running to the mining sites were no longer profitable. The narrow-gauge railway running to Wilsdruff was closed in 1972, although the standard-gauge section continued to operate for a few years afterwards. The tracks have been preserved in the station area to this day. Since its closure, Potschappel station has reverted to being a through station only.

Since 31 May 1992, Freital-Potschappel station has been served by the Dresden S-Bahn. The flood in August 2002 caused devastating damage to the tracks, so that in the following years extensive repairs and new works had to be carried out. The platform and a bridge north of the station were moved somewhat to the southeast, but the abutments of the old building including the entrance to the platform were preserved. During the reconstruction work, large parts of the PHV line were also dismantled so that a continuous narrow-gauge link between Hainsberg and Potschappel no longer exists. The carriages of the Weißeritz Valley Railway and those of the Radebeul–Radeburg railway (Lößnitzgrundbahn) have since then been transported by low-loader to the carriage repair shop in Potschappel.
