= 1st Lithuanian Dragoon Regiment =

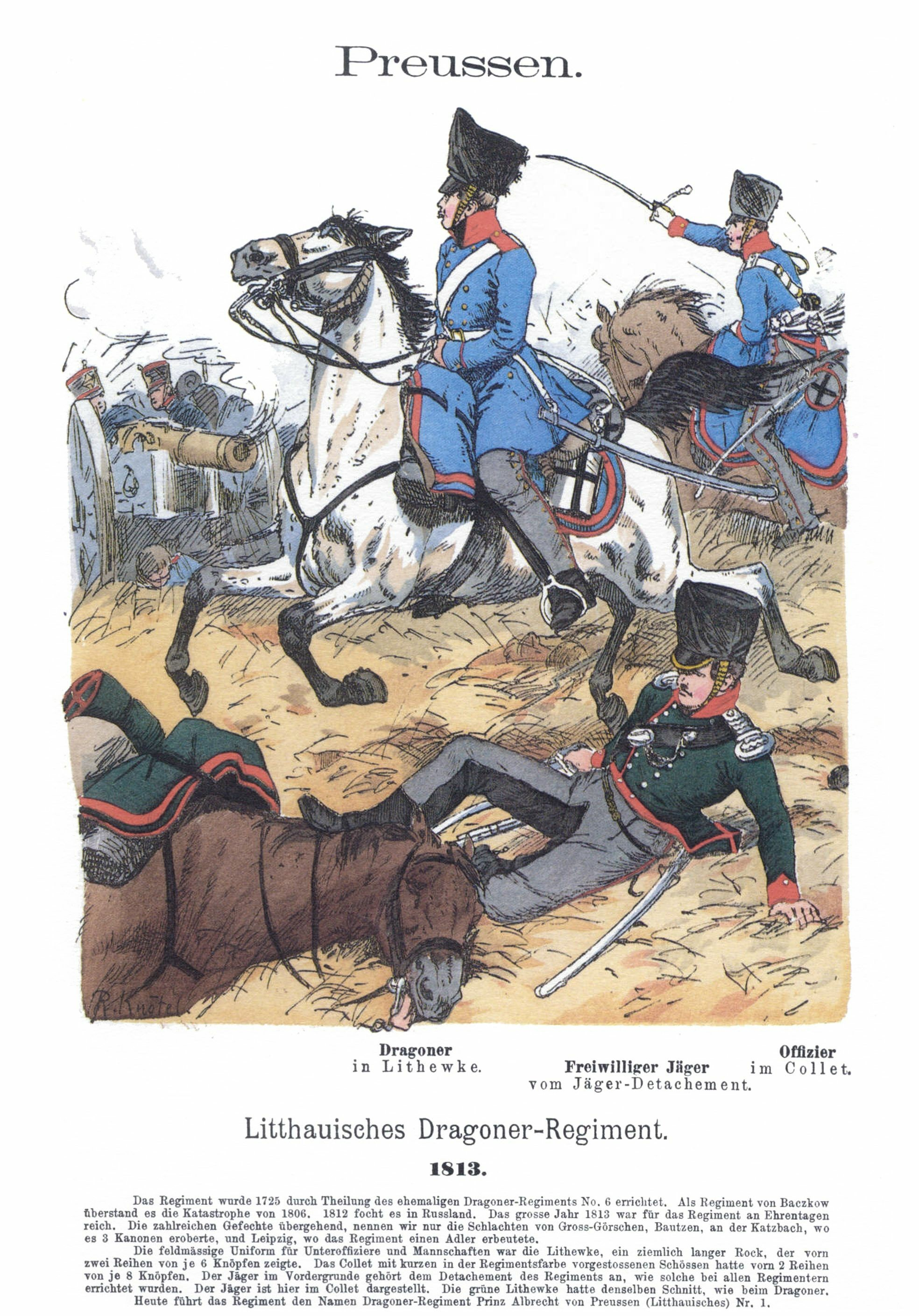
- The Lithuanian Dragoon Regiment in 1813
- Active: 1717–1919
- Country: Kingdom of Prussia
- Branch: Prussian Army
- Type: Dragoons
- Most known garrison: Tilsit, Lithuania Minor, East Prussia
- Nickname: "Porcelain Regiment"
- Engagements: War of the Austrian Succession; First Silesian War; Battle of Chotusitz; Second Silesian War; Battle of Kesselsdorf; Seven Years' War; Battle of Gross-Jägersdorf; Battle of Zorndorf; Battle of Fehrbellin; Battle of Freiberg; War of the Bavarian Succession; Napoleonic Wars; War of the Fourth Coalition; Battle of Eylau; Battle of Heilsberg; French invasion of Russia; Siege of Riga (1812); War of the Sixth Coalition; German campaign of 1813; Battle of Möckern; Battle of Lützen; Battle of the Katzbach; Battle of Wartenburg; Battle of Leipzig; Campaign in north-east France (1814); Battle of Montmirail; Battle of Château-Thierry; Battle of Laon; Battle of Paris; Unification of Germany; Austro-Prussian War; Battle of Trautenau; Battle of Königgrätz; Franco-Prussian War; Battle of Borny–Colombey; Siege of Metz; Battle of Noisseville; Siege of Mézières; Battle of Amiens; World War I (Eastern Front); Russian invasion of East Prussia (1914); Battle of Gumbinnen; Battle of Tannenberg; Battle of the Masurian Lakes; First Battle; Second Battle; Siege of Kaunas (1915); Battle of Vilnius (1915); Riga offensive (1917); Operation Faustschlag

1st Lithuanian Dragoon Regiment (German: Litthauisches Dragoner-Regiment Nr. 1; Lithuanian: 1-asis lietuvių dragūnų pulkas) was a dragoon regiment of the Royal Prussian Army, which recruited heavily among the Prussian Lithuanians of Lithuania Minor. The regiment was formed in spring 1717 and disbanded in June 1919. This regiment was one of the oldest in the whole Prussian army.

The regiment was recruited almost exclusively from volunteers from its immediate homeland, i.e., Lithuania Minor, and was well-regarded in the army at all times for having the best horses and riders. In the memoirs of the inhabitants of Lithuania Minor, it is written that they were proud of serving in this regiment. Even until the end of the First World War, the signs outside the soldiers' barracks were in Lithuanian and German languages.

== Formation ==
=== 1710s ===
On 19 April 1717, King Frederick William I of Prussia ordered major general Heinrich Jordan von Wuthenau to form a regiment from 780 Saxon cavalrymen and dragoons, which Augustus II the Strong gifted the Prussian King.

As early as May, von Wuthenau divided the regiment into 8 companies. The uniform consisted of a white coat with light blue embroidery, because of which the regiment was called the "Porcelain regiment".

In December, the regiment was ordered to march to Insterburg, Tilsit, Ragnit, Goldap, Stallupönen and Pillkallen.

In 1718, the whole regiment was assembled in a single place for a military exercise in Insterburg, and by August of that year, it already had 10 companies. In 1725, it was established that each company would have 110 dragoons, and each company was renamed a squadron.

=== 1720s ===
When General von Wuthenau died in 1727, the regiment was divided into two regiments, which were that of von Cosel and von Dockum. The regiment von Cosel maintained the same uniform and was assigned all of the same garrisons except Tilsit. The Dragoon Regiment von Dockum remained in Tilsit with its 5 squadrons and received white coats with red embroidery and received silver timpani the next year. The Dragoon Regiment von Dockum was later called the 7th Dragoon Regiment.

== Frederick the Great ==
Between 1734 and 1746, the regiment was often relocated to various places, such as Berlin, Magdeburg, Potsdam, or Tilsit. Finally, in 1746, Tilsit was established as the regiment's permanent garrison.

=== First Silesian War (1740–1742) ===
In the final, extremely costly battle of the First Silesian War – the hard-fought Battle of Chotusitz – the dragoons, under the command of General Buddenbrock, engaged the Imperial–Royal von Birkenfeld Cuirassier Regiment, but suffered such heavy losses during the subsequent Austrian counter-attack that the Prussian cavalry could no longer be deployed. In the process, the Leibstandarte was lost when Austrian grenadiers snatched the banner from the severely wounded Ensign Paul Wilhelm von Roop in the heat of battle.

The regiment's casualties were the following: 4 officers and 152 men killed, 6 officers and 71 men wounded, and 3 officers and 280 men taken prisoner.

=== Second Silesian War (1744–1745) ===
During the Second Silesian War, on 13 December 1745, the Dragoon Regiment, together with the left wing of the Prussian cavalry, came under a surprise attack by strong Saxon cavalry units in a sunken road near Nieder-Zehren, in conditions of black ice and darkness, sustaining numerous casualties. The regimental commander, Major General Friedrich Alexander von Roëll, was stabbed to death, whilst the regimental adjutant, Lieutenant Friedrich Wilhelm von Blankenburg, lost the kettledrums and the Leibstandarte, which had already been brought to safety.

Two days later, the dragoon regiment fought in the Battle of Kesselsdorf. Initially, the regiment faced the Saxon mounted Carabiniers Guard and Grenadiers à cheval. It attacked the Electoral Saxon Guard on foot and the Niesemeuschel regiment. The dragoon Stiecklies captured the regimental standard of the Niesemeuschel regiment, whilst a standard and a pair of silver kettledrums were seized from the Carabiniers Guard. The Saxon colonel and regimental commander Christoph Gottfried von Niesemeuschel was taken prisoner by the Prussians three days later in Dresden.

=== Seven Years' War (1757–1763) ===
During the Seven Years' War, the regiment faced the Hungarian–Serbian Hussar Regiment and the Chuguyev Cossack Regiment at the Battle of Gross-Jägersdorf (30 August 1757), driving them back behind the Russian infantry as the battle progressed. Together with the Leib Squadron, an enemy battery of 10 heavy guns was captured, and a grenadier battalion was successfully engaged. Three squadrons, together with the von Platen Dragoon Regiment, attacked the Vologda and Suzdal infantry regiments, inflicting significant losses (136 men) upon them. In mid-September/early October 1757, the dragoons fought at Setzlaken and Tilsit.

==== 1758 ====
They then marched to Pomerania, taking part in the skirmish at Sternberg on 5 August 1758 and in the advance on Zielenzig from 9 to 14 August 1758. At the Battle of Zorndorf, the dragoons were able to effectively engage several Russian regiments pursuing the defeated vanguard. In the process, 5 cannons were captured. The vanguard was subsequently able to regroup in an orderly fashion. Their own losses amounted to 4 officers, 59 men and 115 horses.

On 23 September 1758, the skirmish at Zehdenick took place, followed by the skirmish at Linum on 25 September 1758. During these engagements, the Swedish Leib-Cuirassier Regiment lost a total of 3 officers and 300 men were taken prisoner. In an attack on a Swedish battalion, however, the regiment lost 2 officers and 104 men. This was followed by the Battle of Fehrbellin on 28 September 1758, the skirmish at Boitzenburg on 15 October 1758 and the skirmish at Eilenburg on 15 November 1758. Together with the Malachowski Hussar Regiment, 2 cannons and 2 ammunition wagons were captured during these engagements. This was followed by another march to the Polish–Lithuanian Commonwealth.

==== 1759 ====
On 1 January 1759, the regiment took part in the assault on Damgarten and the capture of Anklam. This was followed on 27 August 1759 by the skirmish at Zahna, on 29 August 1759 by a skirmish at Torgau, and on 4 September 1759 by the skirmish at Großenhain. Here, the Imperial–Royal Palatinate Hussar Regiment suffered losses of 368 men and 500 horses. On 5 September 1759, the skirmish at Dresden took place, followed by another skirmish at Torgau on 8 September 1759. Once again, 8 cannons and 16 ammunition wagons were captured, and 26 officers and 850 men were taken prisoner. Own losses were estimated at 4 officers and 186 men. In the skirmish at Triebsche on 16 September and that at Korbitz on the same day, the Serbelloni Cuirassier Regiment was driven into a ravine near Stroischen. As many as 10 enemy officers and 64 men were taken prisoner. The regiment lost 8 officers, 180 men and 68 horses in the process. The next encounters with the enemy took place on 7 November 1759 at the skirmish near Niederzehren, on 9 November at the skirmish near Meissen, and on 23 November 1759 at the skirmish near Unsewitz.

==== 1760 ====
In 1760, battles were fought in Pomerania, at Kavelpaß, Lübbersdorf, Jogow, Taschenberg, Prenzlau, Röppersdorf, Schiedeberg and near Berlin. Near Berlin, the regiment lost two officers and 80 men. This was followed by engagements at Belzig, Leipzig, on 19 October 1760 at Taschenberg, and the skirmish at Tessin (Zarnewanz). Here, a squadron routed the Swedish cavalry and captured a cannon.

==== 1761 ====
The campaign in Pomerania continued into 1761. Skirmishes took place near Belgard from 12 to 18 June. These were followed by the skirmish at Körlin on 19 August, the skirmish at Gröpfack-Krug on 4 September, and the skirmish at Garrin on 6 September. Here, the Russian Archangelgorod Dragoon Regiment was defeated and three standards captured. In the skirmish at Treptow on 12 September, the dragoon Kleibitz managed to capture Colonel Count Wittgenstein. In the skirmish at Körlin, two unicorns (long, smooth-bore howitzers) were captured.

The regiment also fought on 2 October in the skirmish at Spie, on 10 October in the skirmish at Gervin, on 16 October in the skirmish at Triglaff, on 20 October in the skirmish at Schwanteshagen, on 20 October at Kantecker Wald, and on 22 October during the bombardment of Gollnow. This was followed by participation on 3 November in the skirmish at Paßkrug, on 15 November in the skirmish at Greiffenberg, on 12 December in the assault on Spie, and finally in the skirmish at Klempin. The regiment lost one officer, 136 men and 154 horses.

==== 1762 ====
The year 1762 began with the skirmish at Malchin. From 4 to 10 January, the regiment conducted patrols in Mecklenburg and took part in the skirmish at Döbeln. The regiment recaptured the redoubt at Klingenberg, which had been lost by the von Bähr Grenadier Battalion, taking 500 prisoners in the process. On 15 October, skirmishes took place at Ruppersdorf, Tuttendorf and Konradsdorf. On 16 October, the regiment was stationed at Kleinwaltersdorf.

In the Battle of Freiberg, the Bayreuth Cuirassier Regiment was defeated, and the von Salm regiment was scattered. Eight cannons were captured in the process. Two of the dragoon regiment's squadrons also routed the 51st and 33rd Regiments, taking 17 officers and 700 men prisoner, whilst losing one officer, 66 men and 72 horses.

=== War of the Bavarian Succession (1778–1779) ===
During the War of the Bavarian Succession, the regiment took part in the skirmish at Braunsdorf on 28 July 1778 and in the raid at Eckertsdorf against the Austrians on 11 August 1778. Its own losses amounted to two officers, 151 men and 157 horses.

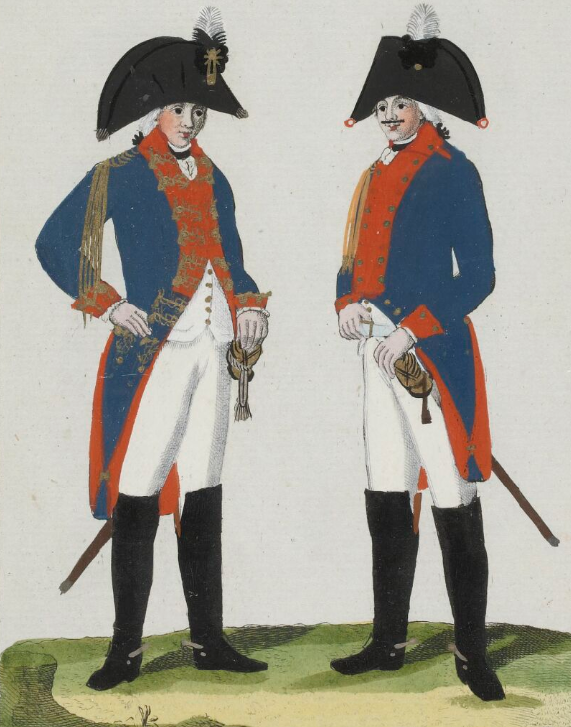
The regiment's uniforms just before the war of 1806

== Napoleonic Wars ==
=== War of the Fourth Coalition (1806–1807) ===
The regiment was one of the few pre-war regiments that survived the War of the Fourth Coalition.

At Schulitz in 1806, Lieutenant von Sydow succeeded in breaking through a line of 500 hussars with 50 men and Lieutenant Heinrich Erdmann Gottlieb von Massow (13th Dragoon Regiment); on 6 December 1806, the rearguard succeeded in breaking out of Thorn, which had by then been occupied by the French; from 20 to 23 December, skirmishes took place at Biezun on the Soldau; in 1807, the skirmish at Schippenbeil.

At the Battle of Eylau, Lieutenant von Turau saved a gun; this was followed by skirmishes at Spanden and Dietrichsdorf. The regiment fought at the Battle of Heilsberg. It is claimed that there it fought the Gens-d'armes d'élite (which perhaps refers to the Gendarmerie d'ordonnance).

=== Peacetime ===
After the Treaties of Tilsit and the cabinet order of 14 September 1808, regiments were no longer named after their commanders. During the Prussian Army's reorganisation, the regiment was initially called the East Prussian Dragoon Regiment (Ostpreußisches Dragoner-Regiment), and after the cabinet order of 14 September 1808, the regiment was called the 3rd Dragoon Regiment. The Lithuanian Dragoon Regiment was at first garrisoned in Tilsit and Insterburg.

=== French invasion of Russia ===
Two of the regiment's squadrons were made part of the 1st Mobile Dragoon Regiment, which was part of Yorck's Prussian Auxiliary Corps. This corps fought on Napoleon's side in the French invasion of Russia in 1812.

At the end of July 1812, the regiment was stationed at Eckau, where it celebrated the King's birthday on 3 August and Napoleon's birthday on 15 August – Prussia being, at that time, forced into an alliance with him. After the fighting began, on 22 August 1812 near Dahlenkirchen (not far from Ķekava), Lieutenant Kyckbusch and five dragoons captured 45 Russian skirmishers; this was followed by further skirmishes at Bauske, Gräfenthal and Dahlenkirchen from 27 to 30 September.

The Lithuanian Dragoon Regiment broke through two Russian infantry squares and captured a cannon Piktupėnai; on 28 December 1812, the skirmish at Ragnit took place. Then, the convention of Tauroggen (Tauragė) was signed on 30 December 1812.

=== War of the Fifth Coalition (1813–1814) ===
Later, the Lithuanian Dragoons Regiment fought in Germany and France in 1813 and 1814 and repeatedly distinguished themselves in Yorck's Corps, especially at Möckern. In the Battle of Leipzig, the regiment captured a French Imperial Eagle.

At the Battle of Möckern on 5 April 1813, the regiment, under the command of Major von Platen, led the 2nd West Prussian Dragoons, the vanguard of an attack carried out jointly with Prussian Leibhussars against some 1,200 men of French cavalry entrenched behind trenches, who, with few losses of their own (3 dead, 3 wounded officers, including Platen, 19 horses) were overrun, driven into the arms of the Queen's Dragoons and Russian Grodno Hussars, and largely wiped out.

On 7 April, the regiment joined Yorck's Corps and fought at Merseburg, Großgörschen, Colditz, Königswartha-Weißig, Waldau (losses up to the armistice at Pläswitz: 610 men, of which 49 killed and 258 died from exhaustion), Gröditzberg and Löwenberg.

In the Battle of the Katzbach, the 1st, 2nd and Jäger squadrons captured 30 guns of the French reserve artillery. During an attack on a square formation, a further 4 guns were captured. Their own losses amounted to 3 officers, 89 men and 108 horses.

On 3 October, the dragoons fought at Wartenburg; on 16 October in the Second Battle of Möckern, a preliminary skirmish of the Battle of the Nations near Leipzig, where in the evening a particularly bloody attack against a square of French Marine Guard infantry was carried out mainly by the dragoons, whose eagle was captured and 2,000 prisoners taken (casualties: one officer, 17 men, 28 horses).

==== Campaign in north-east France ====
The Lithuanian Dragoon Regiment fought on in the Campaign in north-east France (1814).

On 11 January 1814, the regiment fought at Saint-Avold. The 1st Squadron saw action at Manheulles on 19 January. The unit subsequently took part in the fighting at La Chaussée, Châlons and Montmirail. At Battle of Château-Thierry, the regiment fought with the French Guard Cavalry (casualties: one officer, 35 men, 28 horses). In the Battle of Laon, the regiment reached the artillery park and captured 9 guns and a war chest. Following fighting at Sézanne, the regiment took part in the Battle of Paris on 30 March.

In total, the regiment lost 7 officers, 22 non-commissioned officers, 247 men, and 325 horses during the Wars of Liberation.

=== 1815 ===
The regiment was already back in Pomerania on its return march from France when, in the spring of 1815, it learnt of Napoleon's return to power and the beginning of the Hundred Days. It became part of the reserve cavalry of the 5th Brigade under Gustav Kalixt von Biron and set off on the march to Belgium (then the Southern part of the United Kingdom of the Netherlands) without taking part in any combat operations. After returning to Pomerania, it marched to Detmold in September 1815 to carry out a planned federal execution against Lippe, which, however, did not take place. After a three-week stay, it returned to Berlin, where it awaited the King’s return.

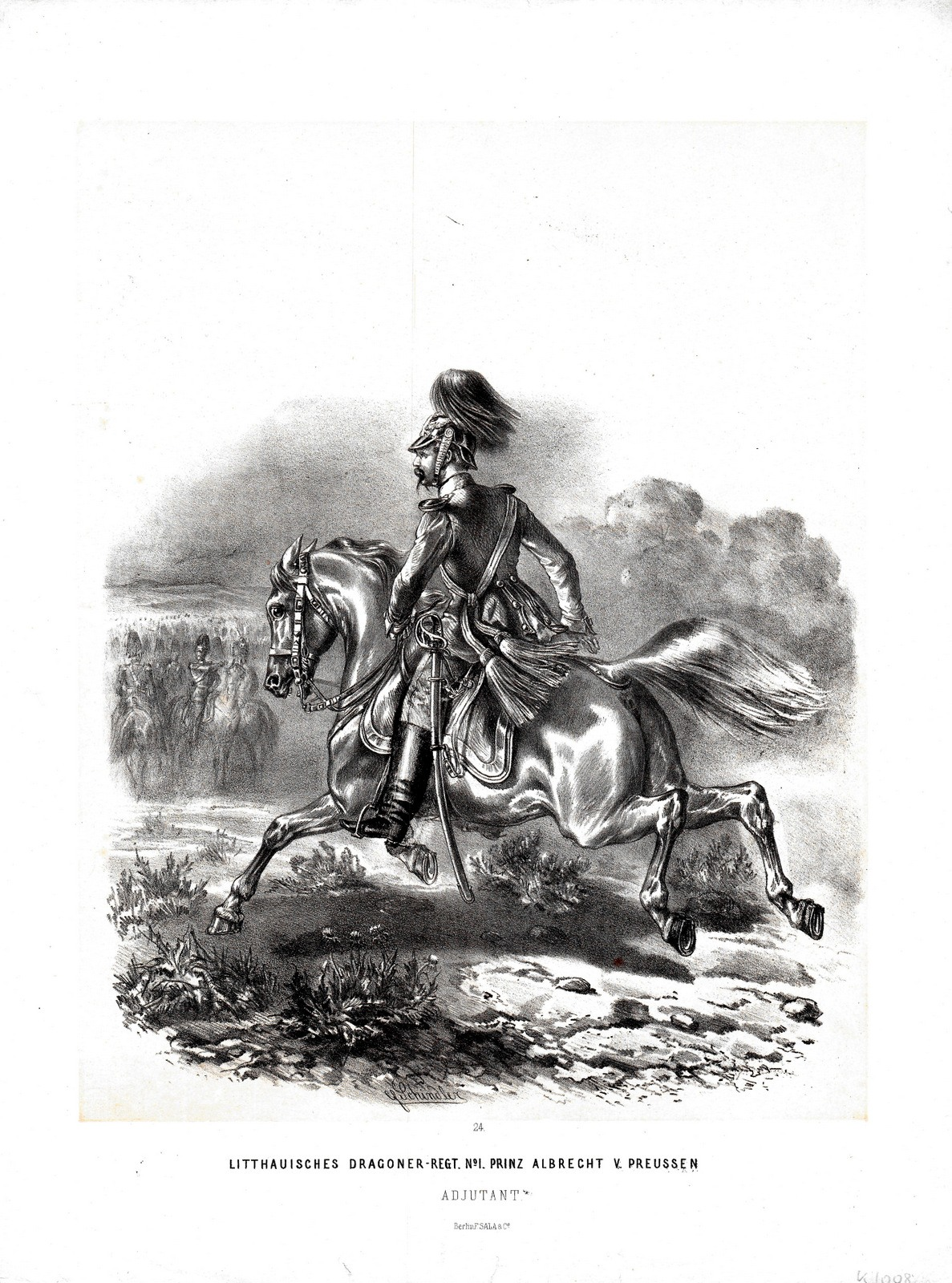
Adjutant from the regiment, mid-19th c.

== 1815–1914 ==
=== After the Napoleonic wars ===
Circa 1815–1816, the regiment's soldiers were dispersed into other parts of the Prussian Kingdom, i.e. Berlin, Demmin or Tilsit. In 1819, the regiment was renumbered from being the 3rd in the dragoon regiments' sequence to being the 1st. During 1860–1866, the regiment garrisoned different parts of East Prussia such as Insterburg or Ragnit.

To mark the coronation of King Wilhelm I, the regiment was named after his youngest brother, Colonel-General Prince Albert of Prussia (1809–1872), and on 18 October 1861 was designated the 1st Lithuanian Dragoon Regiment (Prince Albert of Prussia) (Litthauisches Dragoner-Regiment Nr. 1 (Prinz Albrecht von Preußen)). The name was later changed on 15 October 1872 to 1st Dragoon Regiment "Prince Albert of Prussia" (Lithuanian) (Dragoner-Regiment „Prinz Albrecht von Preußen“ (Litthauisches) Nr. 1).

Finally, from 1879 onward, the regiment was stationed only in Tilsit.

=== Unification of Germany ===
==== Austro-Prussian War (1866) ====
During the Austro-Prussian War, the regiment was attached to the 1st Division and later served as the vanguard of the I Corps within the combined cavalry brigade. At the Battle of Trautenau, the 3rd and 5th Squadrons, as well as 3 platoons of the 1st Squadron, fought against the Austrian Windischgrätz Dragoon Regiment, suffering losses of 4 officers, 73 men and 67 horses. The regiment also took part in the famous battle of Königgrätz. It also fought at Tobitschau thereafter.

In total, it lost 5 officers, 126 men and 219 horses during the war.

==== Franco-Prussian War (1870–71) ====
At the start of the Franco-Prussian War, the 1st and 4th Squadrons saw action near Flanville on 13 August 1870. On 14 August, the regiment took part in the Battle of Colombey and was subsequently deployed in the encirclement and Siege of Metz until 27 October 1870. During this period, the unit also fought in the Battle of Noisseville on 31 August/1 September.

Following the surrender of Metz, the regiment was deployed from 14 to 22 November 1870 during the siege of Mézières. The 3rd and 4th Squadrons fought in the Battle of Amiens on 27 November.

At Rougemontier, the 1st Squadron succeeded in capturing two French batteries and a fully laden ammunition wagon on 4 January 1871.

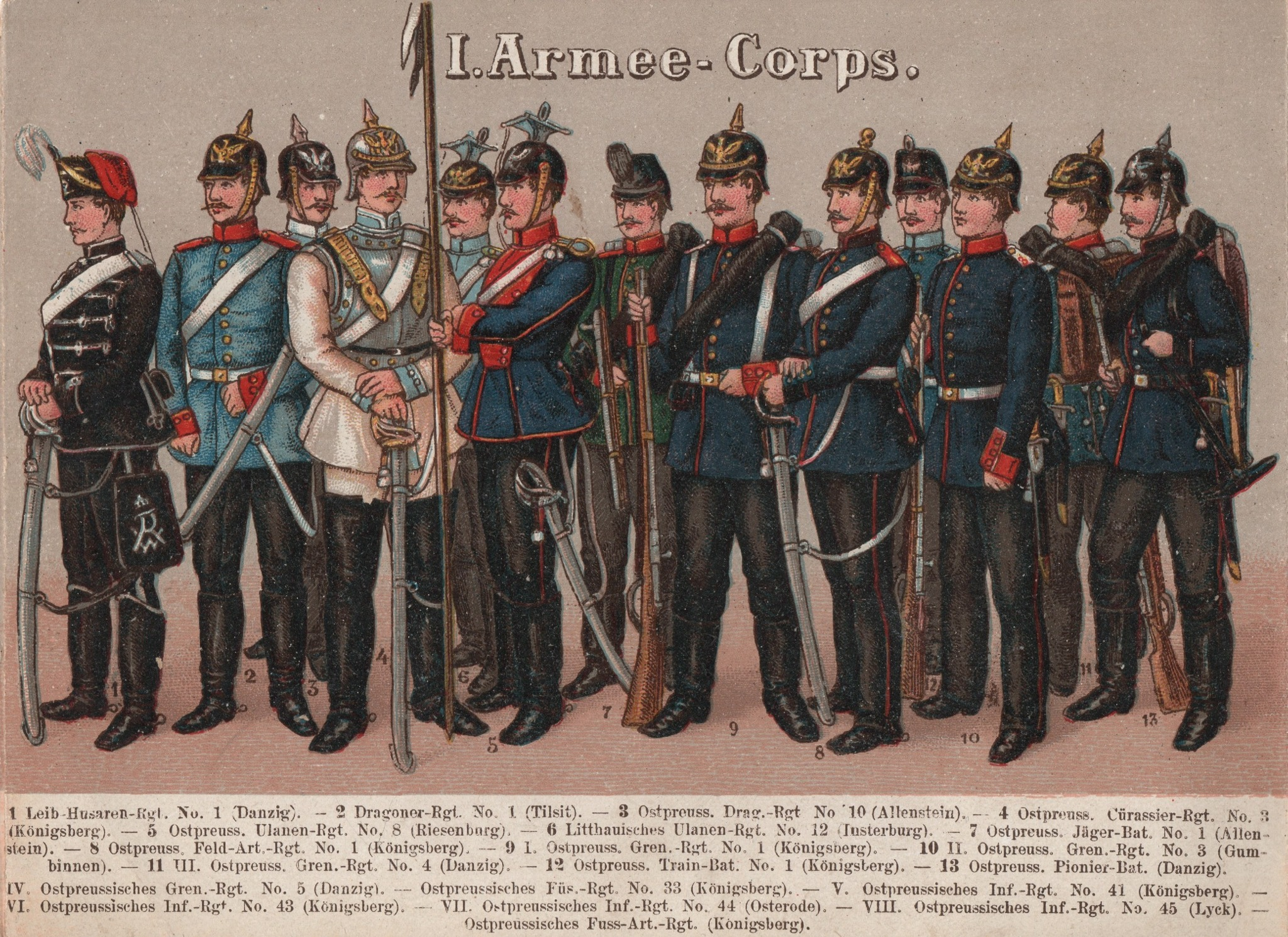
Uniforms of the German I Corps to which the 1st Lithuanian Dragoon Regiment was assigned. The dragoon wears the light blue uniform.

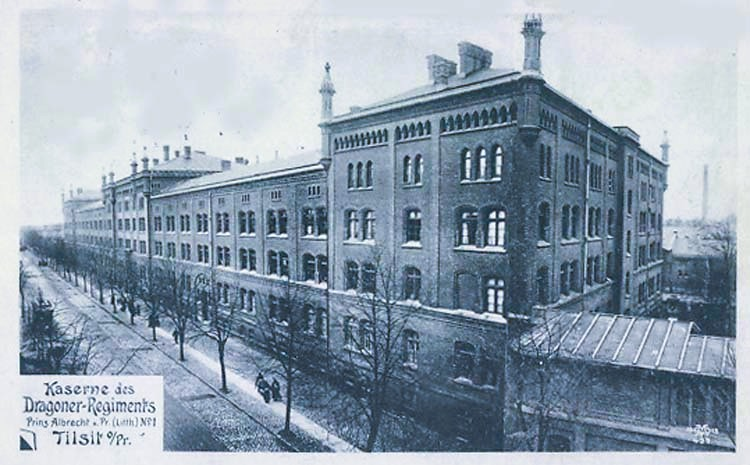
The regimental barracks in Tilsit

== 20th century ==
=== World War I ===
With the outbreak of World War I, the regiment was mobilised as part of the 1st Cavalry Division and saw action on the Eastern Front throughout the war. In the early months of the war, it took part in the defence of East Prussia and fought in 1914 at the Battle of Gumbinnen, the Battle of Tannenberg and the First Battle of the Masurian Lakes, as well as in the Winter Battle of Masuria in February and March 1915. During 1915, the regiment took part in the German occupation of Lithuania and the siege of Kaunas, and fought in the Battle of Vilnius. In 1917, it took part in the Riga offensive.

As part of the occupation of Ukraine to enforce peace with Soviet Russia, the Lithuanian Dragoon Regiment marched into Kyiv in the spring of 1918 and, at the time of the Armistice of 11 November 1918, was stationed in the Poltava region of eastern Ukraine, where, in the course of November 1918, troops under the former Ukrainian Minister of Military Affairs, Symon Petliura, seized power; they turned against the Ukrainian State's Hetman Skoropadsky's government, which had hitherto been supported by the German Empire, whilst simultaneously preparing for the fight against the Red Army, in which the Germans were not permitted to take part. As the Petliura militias controlled the railway links to Kyiv and did not permit the transport of German troops by rail, the Lithuanian Dragoon Regiment had to undertake the retreat to its home in Lithuania Minor, then still part of Germany, which it was ordered on 24 November 1918, on horseback. The dragoons set off on 7 December 1918 on a 2,000-kilometre ride through Eastern Europe and reached their garrison town of Tilsit on 23 February 1919.

Proceedings were brought against the regimental commander, Lieutenant Colonel Osterroth, for aggravated insubordination, as he had given the order to retreat of his own accord, contrary to the instructions of the High Command in Kyiv. Following Lieutenant Colonel Osterroth's regimental report, the proceedings against him were dropped, as he, being a lower-ranking officer on the ground, was better able to assess the situation than his superior and was therefore justified in acting contrary to orders.

Upon its return, the Lithuanian Dragoon Regiment was demobilised and disbanded by June 1919.

== Aftermath ==
A statue commemorating the regiment's fallen soldiers was built after World War I.

Within the Reichswehr, the regiment's traditions were passed on by the 1st Squadron of the 1st (Prussian) Cavalry Regiment, newly-formed in Tilsit, which was part of the 1st Cavalry Division.

In the Wehrmacht, the regiment staff and the 1st Squadron of the 1st Cavalry Regiment in Insterburg continued the tradition.

During World War II, the 1st Cavalry Regiment was employed in creating the 1st Cavalry Division, which was in turn converted into the 24th Panzer Division in late 1941.

The regimental standard was kept in the Tannenberg Memorial until it was blown up in 1945. In 1962, it was transferred to the Panzertruppenschule in Munster and has been exhibited at the German Tank Museum in Münster since its founding in 1983.

== Uniforms ==
During World War I, the uniforms of the regiment's soldiers had red piping.

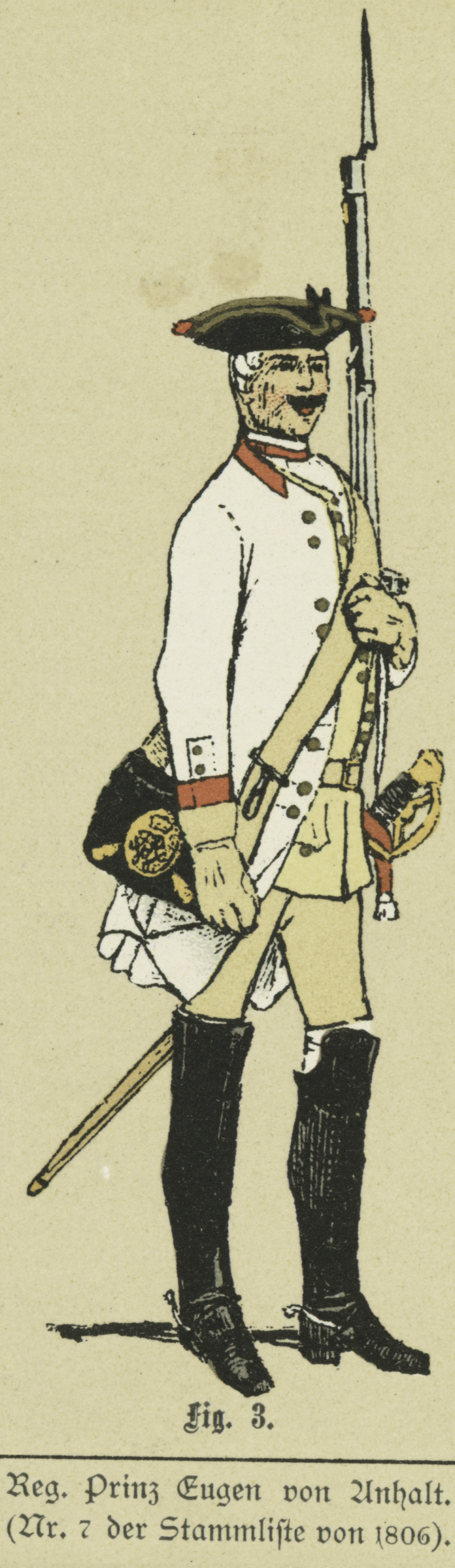
In 1740

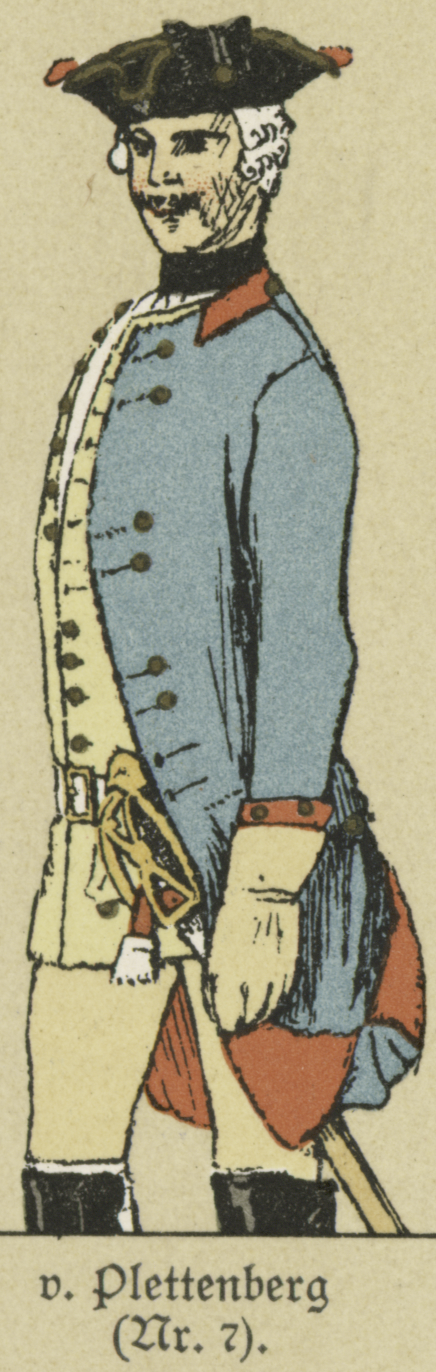
In the late 1740s

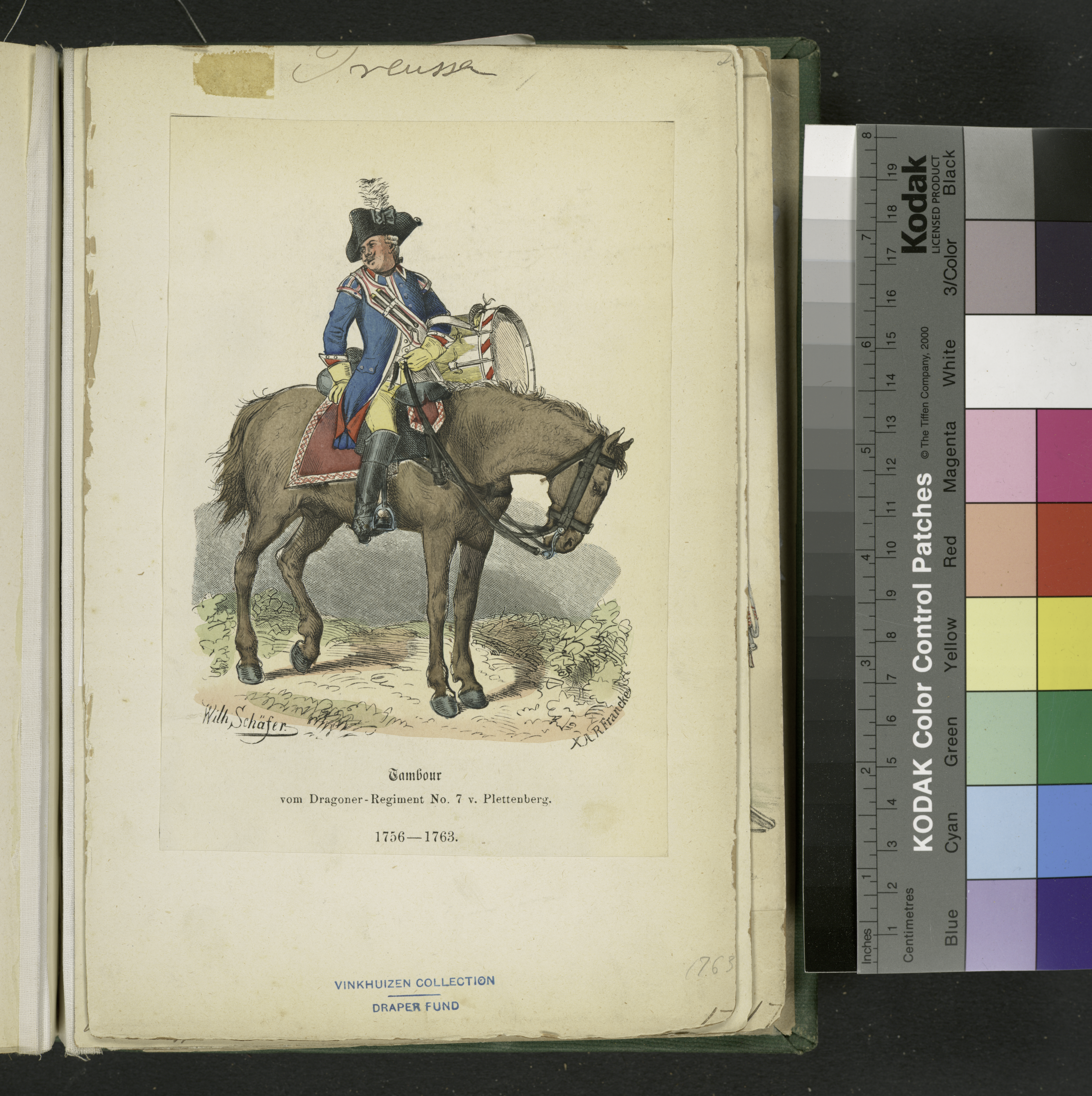
Drummer in 1763

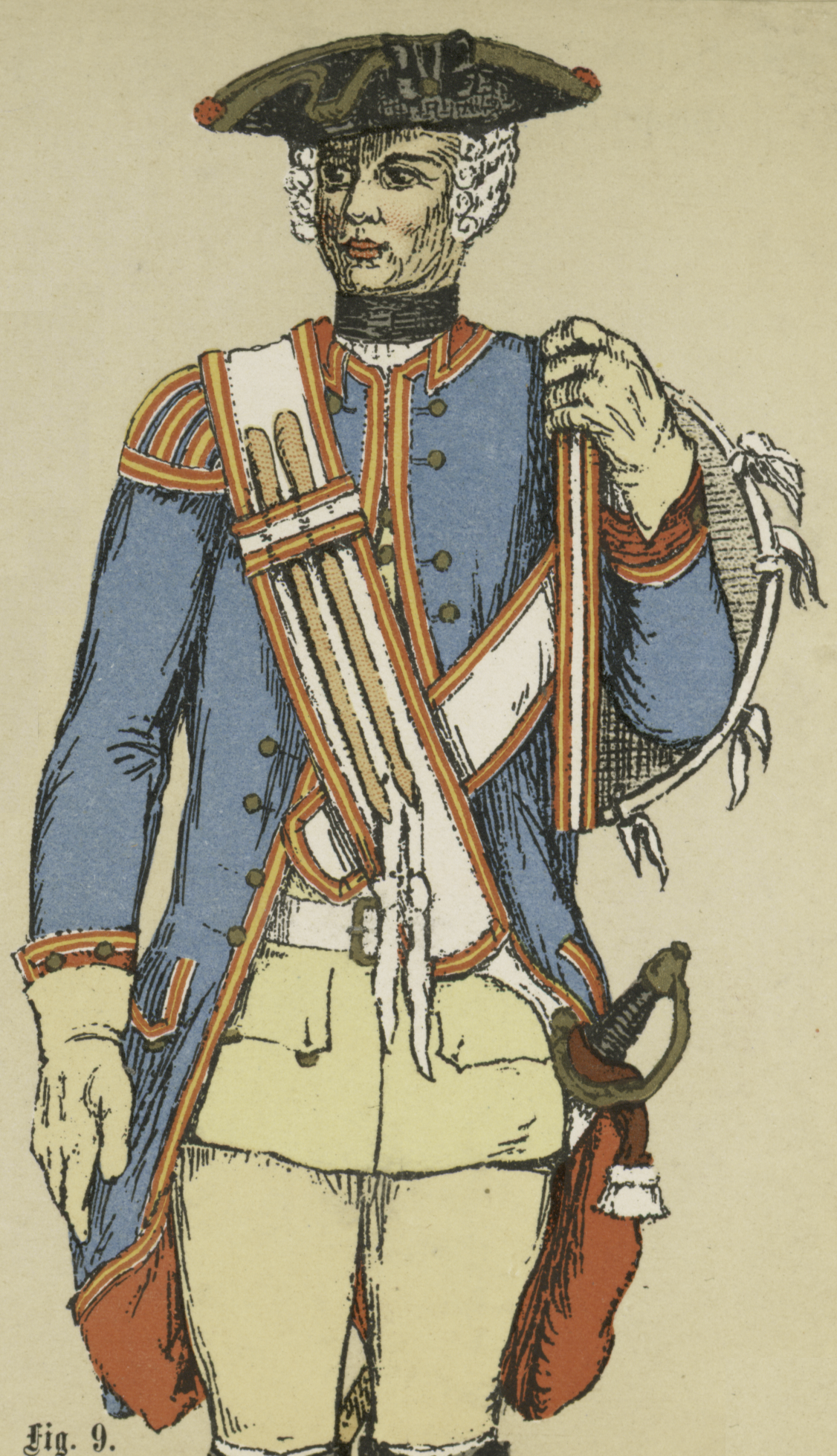
The regiment's drummer in 1756

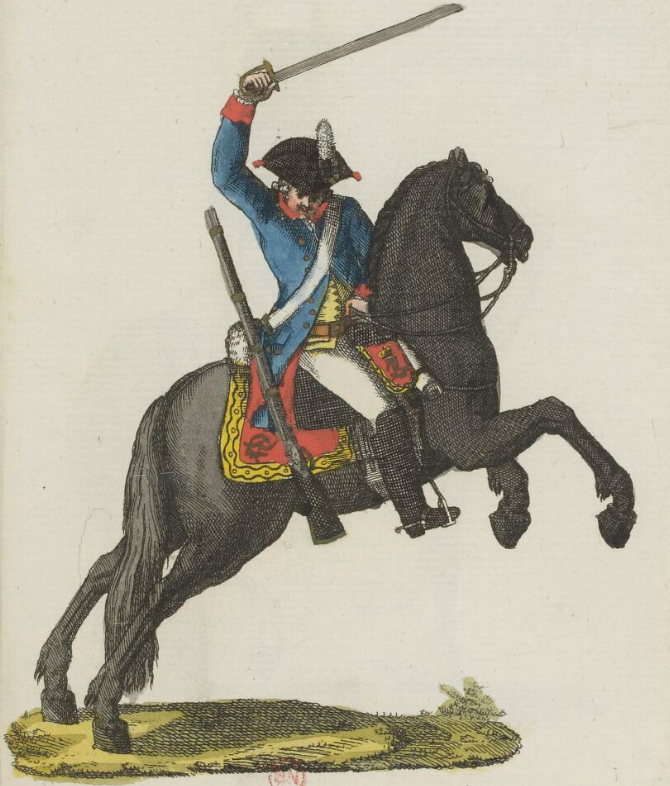
In the 1780s

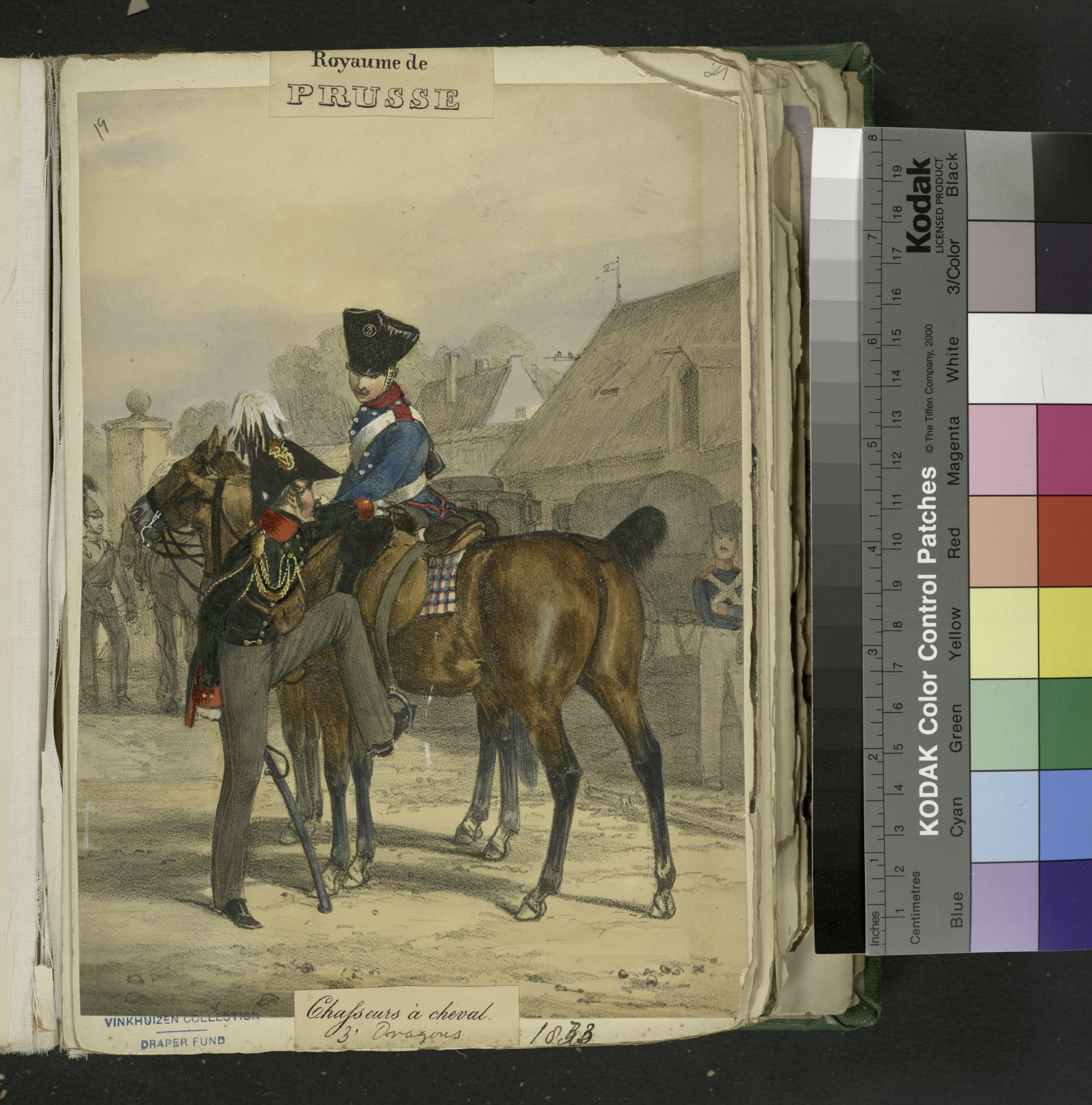
When the regiment was briefly numbered as the 3rd Dragoon Regiment in 1810s

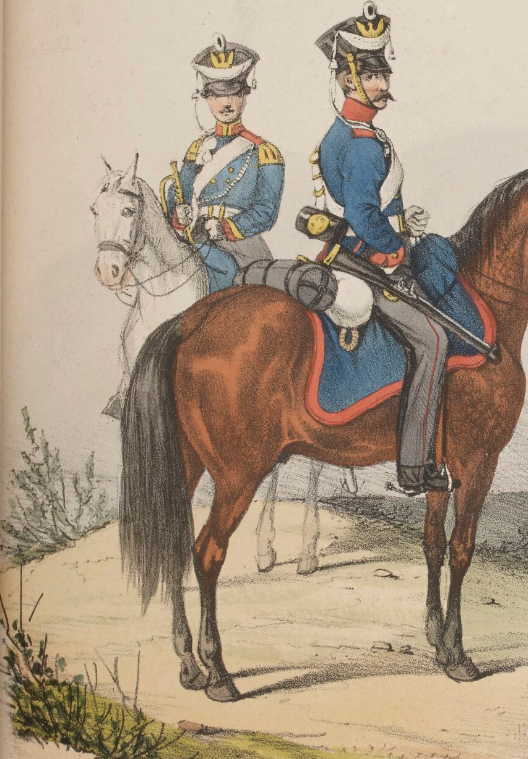
Dragoon and Trumpeter in 1836

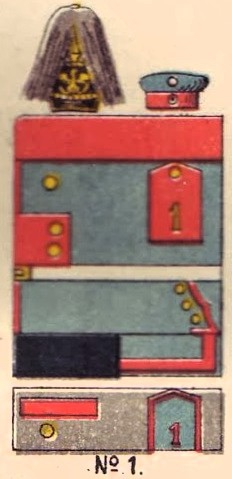
Colour scheme of the uniform in the Belle Époque

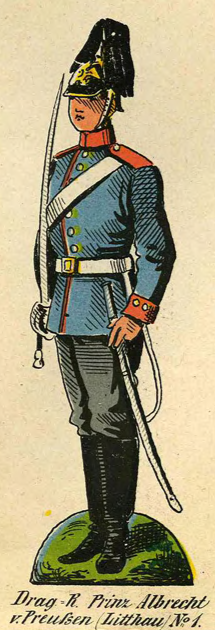
In 1890

== Commanders ==
The regimentschef in 1861 was Prince Albrecht of Prussia the Elder, from 1831 until his death in 1872. He was succeeded in 1895 by his son, Generalfeldmarschall Prince Albrecht of Prussia the Younger, who died in 1906.

The regimental commanders were the following:

No.	Portrait	Commander	Took office	Left office	Time in office
1	Anton Ludolph von Krosigk	Oberst; Anton Ludolph von Krosigk (1667–1737)	19 April 1717	31 March 1721	3 years, 346 days
2	Franz Christoph von Friesenhausen	Oberst; Franz Christoph von Friesenhausen	31 March 1721	15 June 1727	6 years, 76 days
3	Wilhelm von Rappe	Oberstleutnant; Wilhelm von Rappe	15 June 1727	3 May 1737	9 years, 322 days
4	Friedrich von Stosch [de]	Oberst; Friedrich von Stosch (1689–1752)	3 May 1737	1 November 1744	<7 years, 5 months
5	Friedrich Ludwig I. Truchseß von Waldburg [de]	Oberstleutnant; Friedrich Ludwig I. Truchseß von Waldburg (1711–1777)	1 November 1744	19 January 1746	<1 year, 2 months
6	Joachim Wilhelm von Ahlimb [de]	Oberstleutnant; Joachim Wilhelm von Ahlimb (1701–1763)	19 January 1746	17 April 1754	<8 years, 2 months
7	Johann Heinrich Friedrich von Spaen [de]	Major; Johann Heinrich Friedrich von Spaen (1705–1762)	17 April 1754	18 February 1759	<4 years, 10 months
8	Carl Sigismund von Pogrell	Major; Carl Sigismund von Pogrell	1759	? (c.1760)	<10 months
9	Heinrich Ernst von Loßberg	Major; Heinrich Ernst von Loßberg	? (c.1760)	until September 1760	<8 months
10	Joachim Anton von Massow	Oberst; Joachim Anton von Massow	23 September 1760	29 November 1762	<2 years
11	Karl von Eberstein	Major; Karl von Eberstein	29 November 1762	27 October 1778	<15 years, 10 months
12	Sylvius von Frankenberg und Proschlitz [de]	Major, then Oberstleutnant, later Oberst and then Generalmajor; Sylvius von Frankenberg und Proschlitz (1732–1795)	6 November 1778	26 September 1790	<11 years, 10 months
13	Joseph Albrecht Christoph von Bieberstein-Pilchowsky [de]	Oberst; Joseph Albrecht Christoph von Bieberstein-Pilchowsky (1730–1815)	26 September 1790	27 November 1793	<3 years, 2 months
14	Franz von Quoos	Major, then Oberstleutnant, then Oberst; Franz von Quoos	27 November 1793	25 September 1798	<4 years, 9 months
15	Joseph Theodor Sigismund von Baczko [de]	Oberstleutnant, then Oberst; Joseph Theodor Sigismund von Baczko (1751–1840)	25 September 1798	18 November 1806	<8 years, 1 month
16	Helmuth Dietrich von Maltzahn [de]	Oberst; Helmuth Dietrich von Maltzahn (1761–1826)	18 November 1806	1 February 1813	<6 years, 2 months
17	Gottlieb Wilhelm Christian von Platen [de]	Oberst; Gottlieb Wilhelm Christian von Platen (1765–1819)	1 February 1813	30 June 1813	<4 months
18	Theodor von Below [de]	Oberstleutnant then Oberst; Theodor von Below (1765–1839)	30 June 1813	5 January 1816	<2 years, 6 months
19	Rudolph Hiller von Gaertringen [de]	Oberst; Rudolph Hiller von Gaertringen (1771–1831)	5 January 1816	15 November 1827	<11 years, 10 months
20	Wilhelm von Tietzen und Hennig [de]	Oberstleutnant; Wilhelm von Tietzen und Hennig (1787–1869)	30 March 1828	30 March 1836	<8 years
21	Karl von Broesigke [de]	Major; Karl von Broesigke (1790–1852)	30 March 1836	29 March 1839	<2 years, 11 months
22	Heinrich Gregorovius	Heinrich Gregorovius	30 March 1839	23 March 1841	<1 year, 11 months
23	Hans Adolf Erdmann von Auerswald	Hans Adolf Erdmann von Auerswald (1792–1848)	23 March 1841		<6 years
24	Karl von Dunker	Major; Karl von Dunker	27 March 1847	8 March 1848	<11 months
25	Otto von Trotta genannt Treyden [de]	Major then Oberstleutnant, then Oberst; Otto von Trotta genannt Treyden	9 March 1848	7 August 1854	<6 years, 4 months
26	Eduard Kehler	Major then Oberstleutnant; Eduard Kehler	5 October 1854	13 March 1857	<3 years, 2 months
27	Richard von Kalckreuth [de]	Major then Oberstleutnant then Oberst; Richard von Kalckreuth (1808–1879)	14 May 1857	15 September 1862	<5 years, 4 months
28	Otto von Bernhardi [de]	Major then Oberstleutnant then Oberst; Otto von Bernhardi (1818–1897)	16 September 1862	21 March 1868	<5 years, 6 months
29	Ferdinand von Massow [de]	Oberstleutnant then Oberst; Ferdinand von Massow (1830–1878)	22 March 1868	1 December 1871	<3 years, 8 months
30	August von Egloffstein	Oberstleutnant then Oberst; August von Egloffstein	17 December 1871	15 October 1873	<1 year, 9 months
31	Otto von Holtzendorff	Oberstleutnant then Oberst; Otto von Holtzendorff	16 October 1873	4 August 1875	<1 year, 9 months
32	Richard Manché	Major then Oberstleutnant then Oberst; Richard Manché	5 August 1875	4 July 1883	<7 years, 10 months
33	Albert von Kemnitz	Oberstleutnant then Oberst; Albert von Kemnitz	5 July 1883	16 January 1888	<4 years, 6 months
34	Hans von Meyer	Oberstleutnant then Oberst; Hans von Meyer	17 January 1888	27 July 1892	<4 years, 6 months
35	Gustav Kühls	Oberstleutnant then Oberst; Gustav Kühls	28 July 1892	13 May 1894	<5 years, 4 months
36	Hans von Gersdorff (General) [de]	Major then Oberstleutnant then Oberst; Hans von Gersdorff (General) (1847–1929)	14 May 1894	17 August 1898	<5 years, 4 months
37	Kuno von Ruppert	Oberstleutnant then Oberst; Kuno von Ruppert	18 August 1898	21 April 1901	<2 years, 8 months
38	Julius von Platen [de]	Oberstleutnant then Oberst; Julius von Platen (1853–1922)	22 April 1901	9 September 1908	<7 years, 4 months
39	Wedig von Glasenapp	Oberstleutnant then Oberst; Wedig von Glasenapp	10 September 1908	3 April 1913	<4 years, 6 months
40	Georg von Eicke und Pollwitz	Oberstleutnant; Georg von Eicke und Pollwitz	4 April 1913	11 December 1913	<8 months
41	Karl von Kanitz	Oberstleutnant then Oberst; Karl von Kanitz	12 December 1913	21 March 1918	<4 years, 3 months
42	Hermann Osterroht	Oberstleutnant; Hermann Osterroht	22 March 1918	June 1919	<1 year, 2 months

== In Lithuanian folklore ==
The 1st Lithuanian Dragoon Regiment was mentioned repeatedly in local folklore of Lithuania Minor. One example of a song from the early 18th century is this:

Lithuanian song

Lygios lankos, žalios pievos,
Balti dobilėliai;
Čia vaikščiojo, uliavojo
Du baltu dragūnu.

Ei jūs, dragūn dragūnėliai
Balti dobilėliai,
Ko vaikščiojat uliavojat
Po Slezingės žemę?

Ir atlėkė juodas varnas,
Juodasis varnelis,
Ir parnešė baltą ranką
Ir aukso žiedelį.

Ei tu, varne, juodvame,
Juodasis varneli,
Kur tu gavai baltą ranką
Ir aukso žiedelį?

Už Kistrino, pas Kistriną
Didžioj krygėj buvau;
Čion gavau aš baltą ranką
Ir aukso žiedelį.

English translation

Smooth meadows, green pastures,
White little clovers;
Here walked and galloped
Two white dragoons.

Hey you, little dragoons,
White little clovers,
Why are you walking and singing
Across the Silesian land?

And a black crow flew in,
The little black crow,
And brought a white hand
And a golden ring.

Hey you, raven, black one,
Little black raven,
Where did you get the white hand
And the golden ring?

Beyond Küstrin, at Küstrin’s
I was at a great war;
There I got the white hand
And the golden ring.

== See also ==
- List of Imperial German cavalry regiments

== Sources ==
- Bull, Stephen (2000). Newark, Tim (ed.). World War One: German Army. Brassey's History of Uniforms. ISBN 1574882783.

=== Lithuanian ===
- Rėklaitis, Povilas (November 1968). "Mažosios Lietuvos Dragūnų Pulkas". Karys (in Lithuanian). 9: 307–311.
- Jakužaitis, Hermanas, ed. (1952). "Prūsų Lietuvių Pulkai ir Batalionai". Keleivis (in Lithuanian). 1–2: 7, 14.
- Matulevičius, Algirdas (2020). "dragūnai". Mažosios Lietuvos enciklopedija (in Lithuanian). Archived from the original on 29 October 2020.

=== German ===
==== 19th-century ====
- Alt, Georg (1870). Das königlich preußische stehende Heer (in German). Vol. 2: Geschichte der Königl. Preußischen Kürassiere und Dragoner seit 1619 resp. 1631–1870. Berlin: S. Schropp (L. Beringuier & A. Berg). pp. 201–213.
- von Haber, R. (1877). Die Cavallerie des Deutschen Reiches (in German). Vol. 2. Helwing'sche Verlagsbuchhandlung (Th. Mierzinsky). pp. 101–103.
- Sieg, Alexander (1883). Geschichte des Dragoner-Regiments Prinz Albrecht von Preußen (Litthauisches) Nr. 1. 1867 bis 1881 (in German). Berlin: E.S. Mittler & Sohn – via Google Books.
- Kähler, Otto (1898). 150 Jahre des Königlich Preußischen Litthauischen Dragoner-Regiments Nr. 1 seit seiner Errichtung am 1. Mai 1717 bis zum Jahre 1867 (PDF). Berlin: E. S. Mittler & Sohn. OCLC 690775619.

==== 20th-century and later ====
- von Abel, Paul (1905). Stammliste der Königlich preußischen Armee (in German). Berlin: E.S. Mittler & Sohn. pp. 221–223.
- Berckenhagen, Ekhart; Wagner, Gretel (1982). Der bunte Rock in Preußen (in German). ISBN 3886090299.
- Osterroth, Herrmann (1930). Geschichte des Dragoner-Regiments Prinz Albrecht von Preussen (Litthauisches) Nr. 1 (PDF) (in German). Berlin: Verlag „Tradition Wilhelm Kolk“.
- von Ramin, Hans Henning (1967). "Aus der Geschichte ostpreußischer Reiterregimenter (II), abschließender Teil: 1808 bis 1914". Deutsches Soldatenjahrbuch (in German). 15. München-Lochhausen: Schild Verlag.
- Richter, Klaus-Christian (1968). "Die Blauen Dragener sie reiten...: Ein Beitrag zur Geschichte der Dragoner". Deutsches Soldatenjahrbuch (in German). 16. München-Lochhausen: Schild Verlag.

==== 21st-century ====
- Goetzke, Harry (2003). "Das Dragoner-Regiment Prinz Albrecht von Preußen (Litthauisches) Nr. 1 in Tilsit". Tilsiter Rundbrief (in German). 33. Archived from the original on 17 January 2014.
- "Die neuen preußischen Regimenter 1808 – 1918; Dragoner" (in German). Archived from the original on 6 July 2005.
