= Weisiger =

Weisiger is a German language habitational surname for someone from any of various places called Weissig. Notable people with the name include:

- Daniel Weisiger Adams (1821–1872), Confederate States Army brigadier general
- David A. Weisiger (1818–1899), Confederate States Army brigadier general
- Reed N. Weisiger (1838–1908), Texas State Senator
