= Plauen railway station =

Plauen railway station may refer to:

- Plauen (Vogtland) Oberer Bahnhof, the Upper railway station in Plauen along Leipzig–Hof railway
- Plauen (Vogtland) Unterer Bahnhof, the Lower railway station in Plauen along Elster Valley Railway
- Dresden-Plauen railway station, a railway station in Dresden along Dresden–Werdau railway
