= Windberg (Freital) =

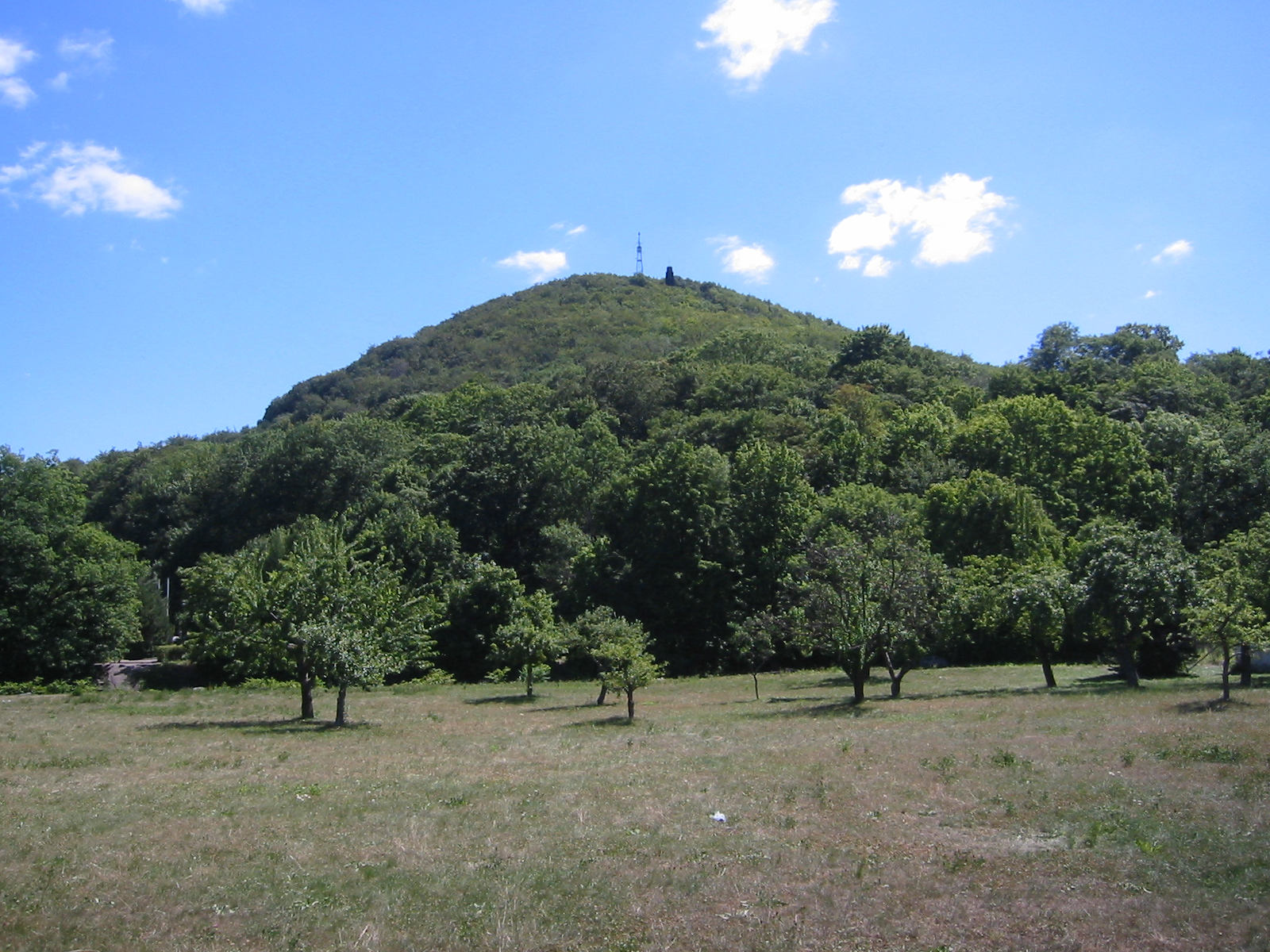

Highest point
- Elevation: 353 m (1,158 ft)
- Coordinates: 50°59′49″N 13°39′39″E

Geography
- Location within Saxony
- Location: Saxony, Germany
- Parent range: Döhlen Basin

Geology
- Rock age: Rotliegendes
- Mountain type: conglomerate with hard coal seams

The Windberg (353 m above NN) is a hill in the borough of Freital near Dresden in the German federal state of Saxony. It is the town's Hausberg or local hill.

== Geomorphology and natural features ==
The Windberg has a striking silhouette, visible from afar. Its narrow northwestern slope opens out into a long, broad and thickly wooded plateau. The hill has been designated as a nature reserve and protected area since 1967 due to its near-natural woodland and rich flora and fauna. Its tectonic cleft cavern, known as the Windbergspalte, is the deepest cave in Saxony with a depth of 44 metres (144 ft).

== Gallery ==
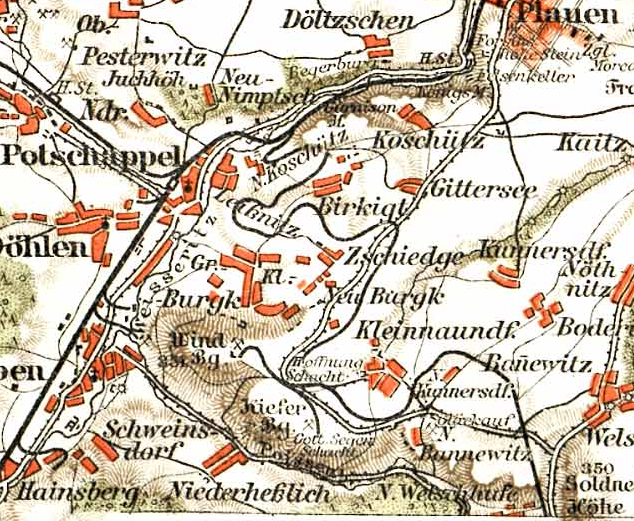
Section of an 1895 overview map with the Windberg

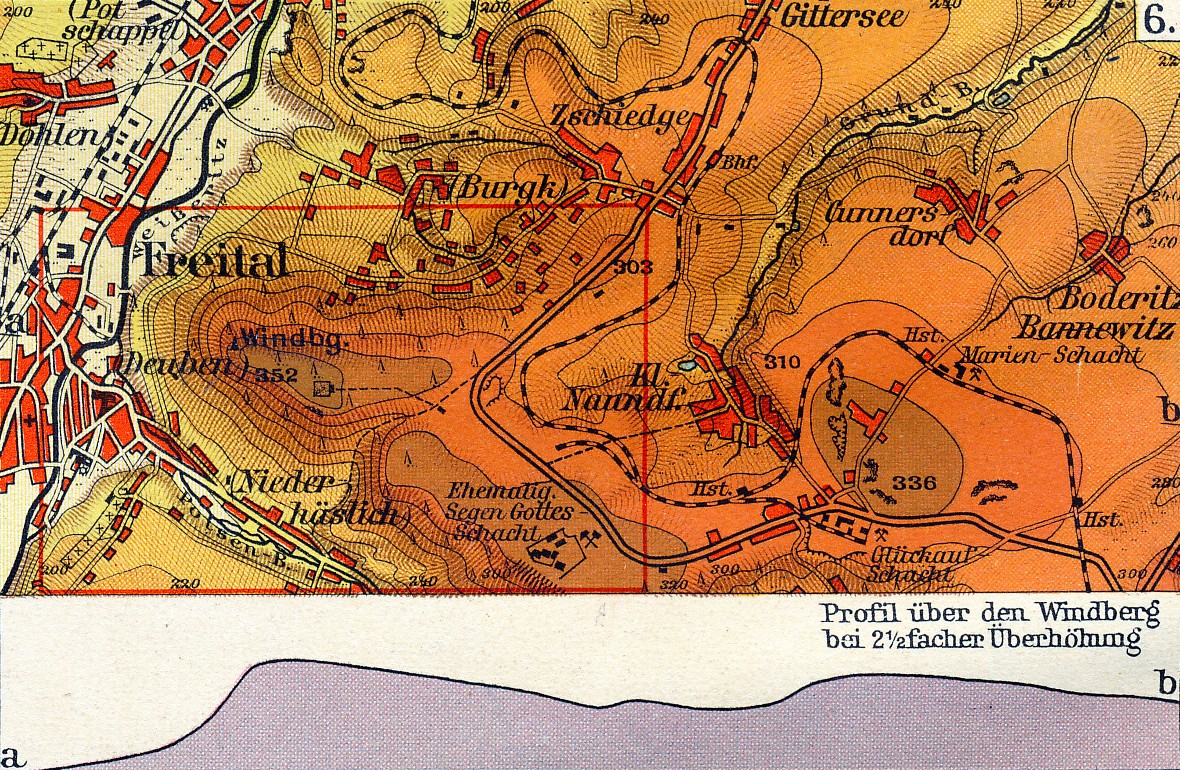
1930 topographical map of the Windberg with contours

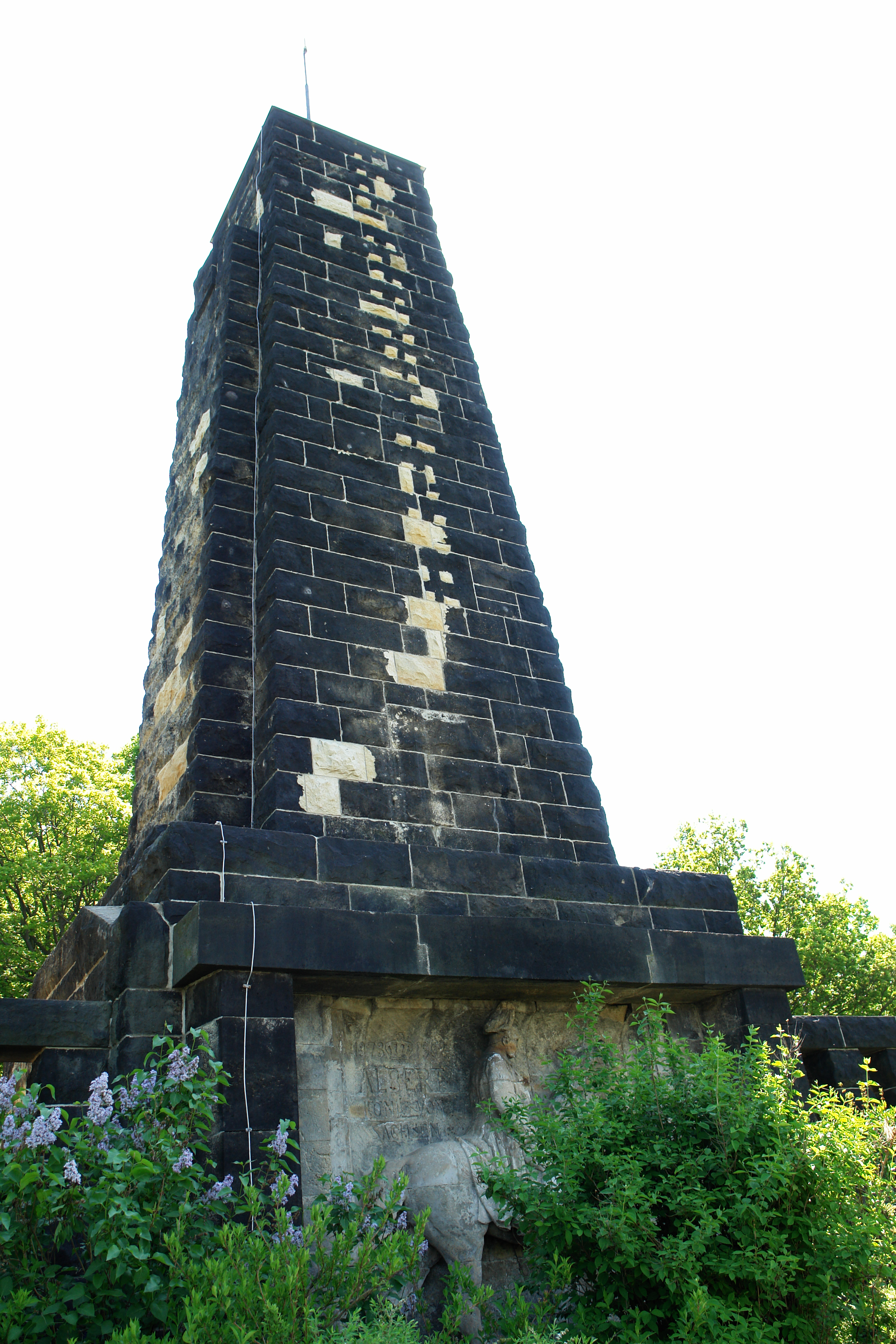
King Albert Monument on the Windberg

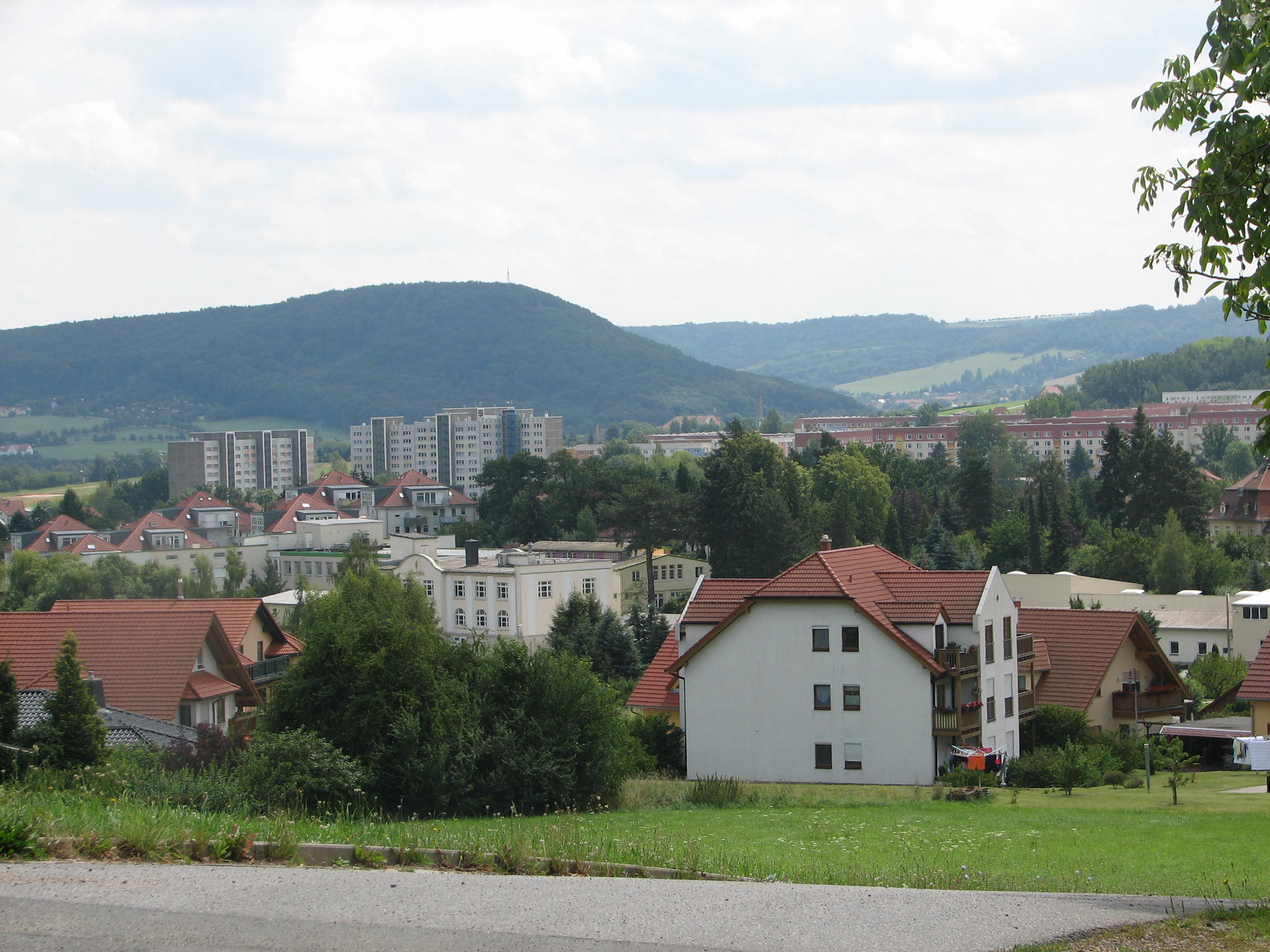
View from Freital-Wurgwitz of the Windberg

== Sources ==
- Haus der Heimat Freital (Hg.): Der Windberg, Freital 1986
