= 1st Dragoons =

The 1st Dragoons or 1st Dragoon Regiment may refer to:

- 1st The Royal Dragoons, a former British Army cavalry regiment, now part of the Blues and Royals
- Regiment "Nizza Cavalleria" (1st), an Italian Army cavalry regiment: previously the 1st Dragoons Reconnaissance Group
- 1st Lithuanian Dragoon Regiment (German: Litthauisches Dragoner-Regiment Nr. 1; Lithuanian: 1-asis lietuvių dragūnų pulkas), a former dragoon regiment of the Royal Prussian Army
- 1st Moscow Life Dragoons Regiment (Imperial Russian Army)
- 1st Cavalry Regiment (United States), previously the First US Regiment of Dragoons

== See also ==
- 1st King's Dragoon Guards
- 1st The Queen's Dragoon Guards
