= Somsdorf =

Coordinates: 50°59′N 13°36′E

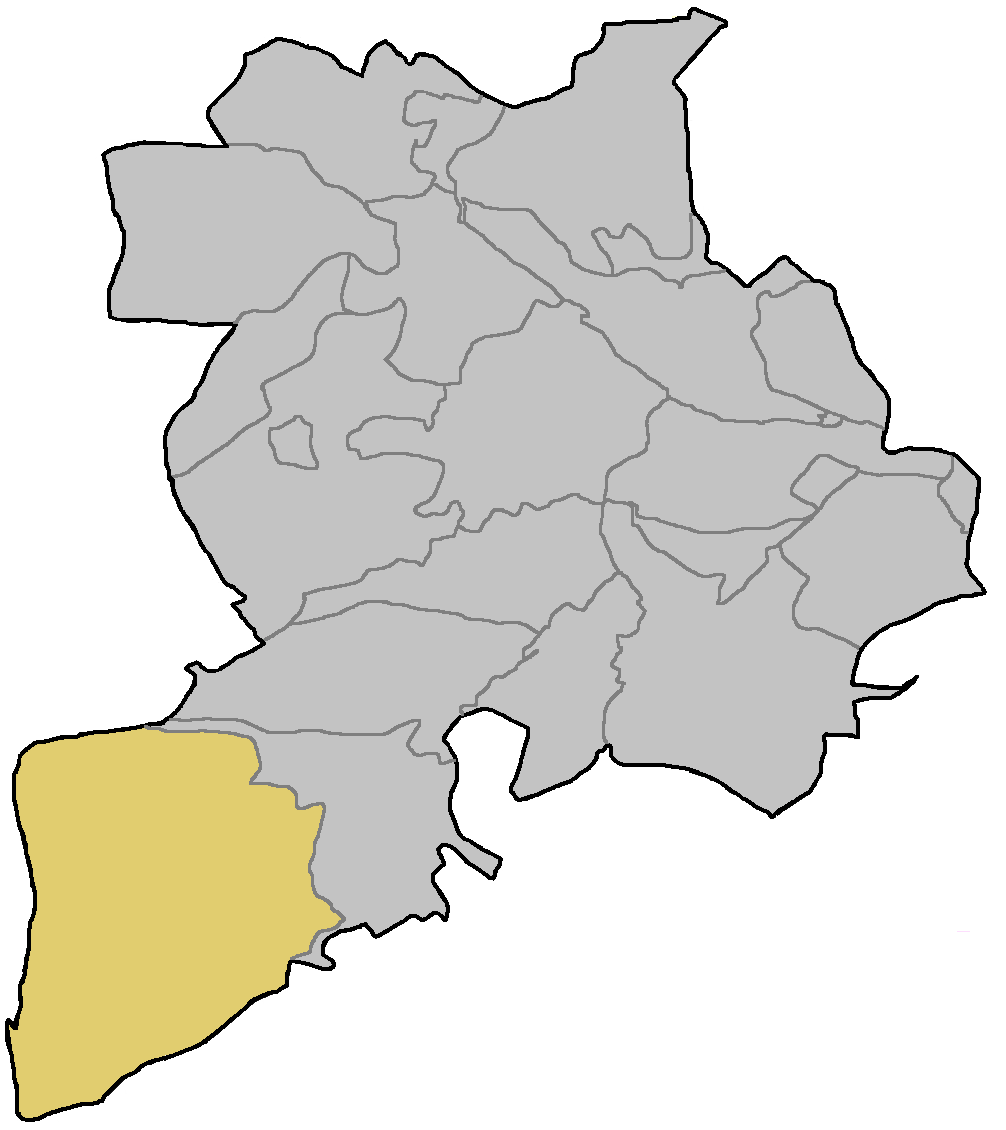
Locator map

Somsdorf is a municipal subdivision of Freital in Sächsische Schweiz-Osterzgebirge district in Saxony state of Germany. It lies in the west of Freital, between the Rote Weißeritz and the Wilde Weißeritz.

== History ==
The village was first mentioned in 1350. Since 1 January 1974, Somsdorf is a municipal subdivision of Freital.

=== Residents ===
1834: 653	1871: 1.184	1890: 1.670
1910: 1.160	1925: 1.212	1939: 1.192
1946: 1.344	1950: 1.309	1964: 1.057
