= Weißig =

Weißig is the name of the following places:

in Saxony:

- Weißig am Raschütz, municipality in the district of Meißen
- Weißig (Dresden), quarter of Dresden
- Weißig (Freital), municipal subdivision of Freital
- Weißig (Kubschütz) quarter of Kubschütz
- Weißig (Lohsa), quarter of Lohsa
- Weißig (Nünchritz), quarter of Nünchritz
- Weißig (Oßling), quarter of Oßling
- Weißig (Struppen), quarter of Struppen

in Thuringia:

- Weißig (Gera), quarter of Gera

in Poland:

- Wysoka, Zielona Góra County
- Wysokie, Lower Silesian Voivodeship
