= Oskar Böhme =

German composer and trumpeter

Oskar Böhme (February 24, 1870 – October 3, 1938) was a German composer and trumpeter.

== Life ==
Oskar Böhme, a son of Wilhelm Böhme, also a trumpeter, was born in Potschappel, a small town near Dresden, Germany, which is now part of Freital. For much of his early career, after studying trumpet and composition in the Leipzig Conservatory of Music until graduating in 1888, it is unknown what Böhme's musical activities were, though it is probable he concertized, playing in smaller orchestras around Germany.

From 1894-1896 he played in the Budapest Opera Orchestra and then moved to St. Petersburg, Russia, in 1897. Böhme played cornet for 24 years in the Mariinsky Theatre, turned to teaching at a music school on Vasilievsky Island in St. Petersburg for nine further years, and at the Central Music College on Mokhovaya Street, from 1921-1930, and then returned to opera with the Leningrad Drama Theatre until 1934.

All his life in St. Petersburg, he lived on Vasilievsky Island, 3rd line, 26

In 1934, however, the Great Terror began under Joseph Stalin and in 1936 a committee was established to oversee the arts in Soviet Russia. According to Russia's anti-foreign policies, Böhme was exiled to Orenburg on account of his German heritage. On October 3, 1938 he was sentenced to death and executed by shooting the same day.

== Music ==
Sextet in E-flat minor - I. Adagio ma non tanto, Allegro molto

Sextet in E-flat minor - II. Scherzo, Allegro vivace

Sextet in E-flat minor - III. Andante cantabile

Sextet in E-flat minor - IV. Allegro con spirito
Performed by the brass sextet of the United States Marine Band, 2020

Böhme composed 46 known works, of which his Trompetensextett in E-flat minor for brass sextet and Trumpet Concerto (Op. 18) are the best known. He wrote in the Romantic style, primarily works for trumpet and brass instruments in general. While, as a consequence of his exile, his works were neglected during the Stalinist era, Böhme is increasingly being rediscovered.
