= Battle of the Masurian Lakes =

Battle of the Masurian Lakes may refer to the following battles of World War I:

- First Battle of the Masurian Lakes, September 1914
- Second Battle of the Masurian Lakes, February 1915
