= Deuben (Freital) =

Coordinates: 50°59′59″N 13°38′48″E

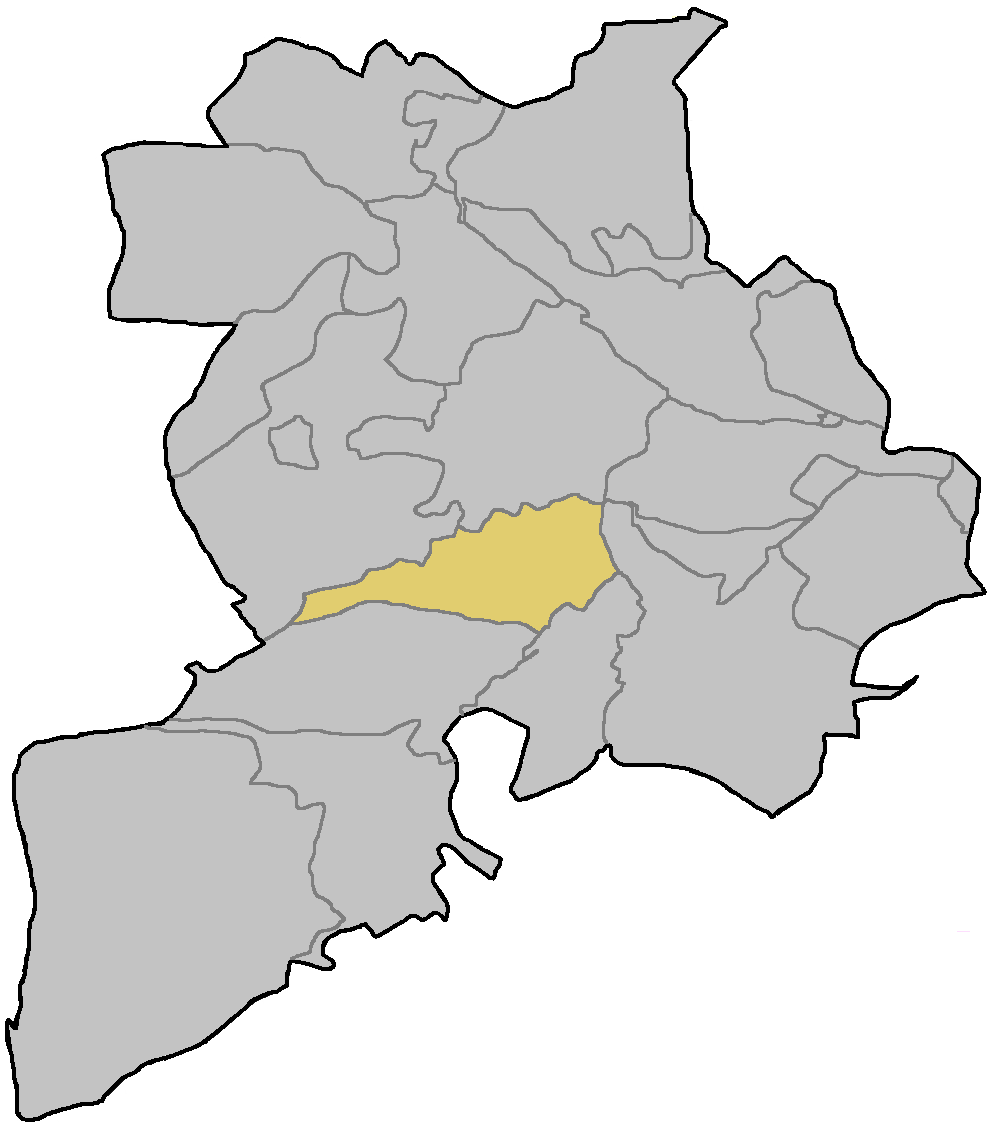
Locator map

Deuben is a municipal subdivision of Freital in Sächsische Schweiz-Osterzgebirge district.

== History ==
The village was first mentioned in 1378. In the 1920s, Deuben was one of the biggest villages in Germany. At 1 October 1921, the villages Deuben, Döhlen and Potschappel merged to the new town Freital.

=== Residents ===
- 1834: 252
- 1871: 4360
- 1890: 6864
- 1910: 11009
