= Dresden-Plauen station =

Railway station in Dresden, Germany

Dresden Plauen
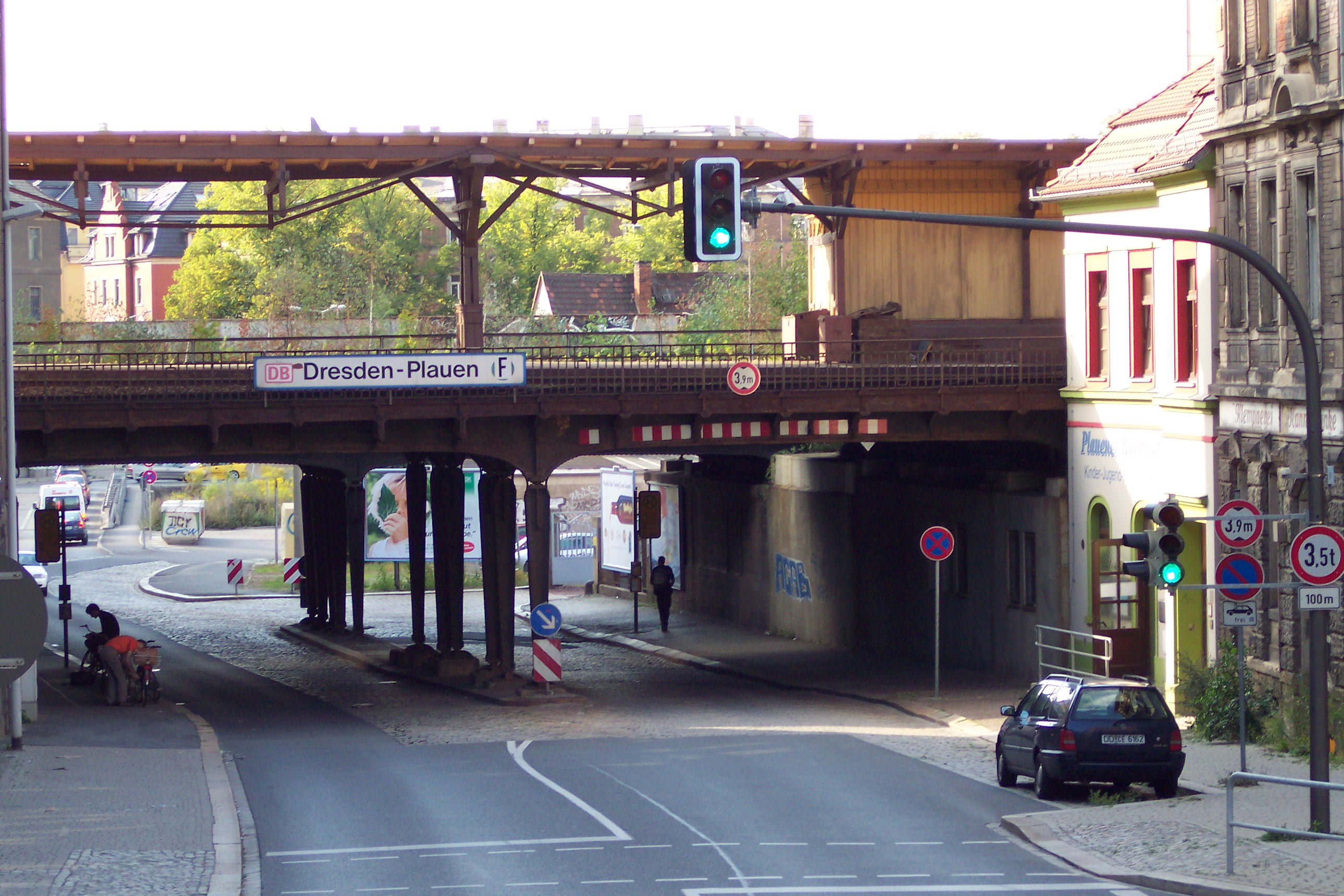
- Dresden-Plauen railway station in 2006

General information
- Location: Altplauen 20, 01187, Dresden, Saxony; Germany
- Coordinates: 51°01′47″N 13°42′11″E
- Line: Dresden–Werdau railway
- Platforms: 1
- Tracks: 2

Construction
- Accessible: Yes

Other information
- Station code: 1355
- DS100 code: DPL
- IBNR: 08013476
- Category: 6
- Website: www.bahnhof.de

History
- Opened: January 1926

Services
Preceding station	Mitteldeutsche Regiobahn	Following station
Freital-Potschappel towards Zwickau Hbf	RB 30	Dresden Hbf Terminus
Preceding station	Dresden S-Bahn	Following station
Freital-Potschappel towards Freiberg (Sachs)	S 3	Dresden Hbf Terminus
Location
- Location within Saxony Location within Germany Location within Europe

Dresden-Plauen station (German: Haltepunkt Dresden-Plauen) is a railway station located in Dresden, Germany. The station is located on the Dresden–Werdau line and operated by DB Station&Service.

== History ==
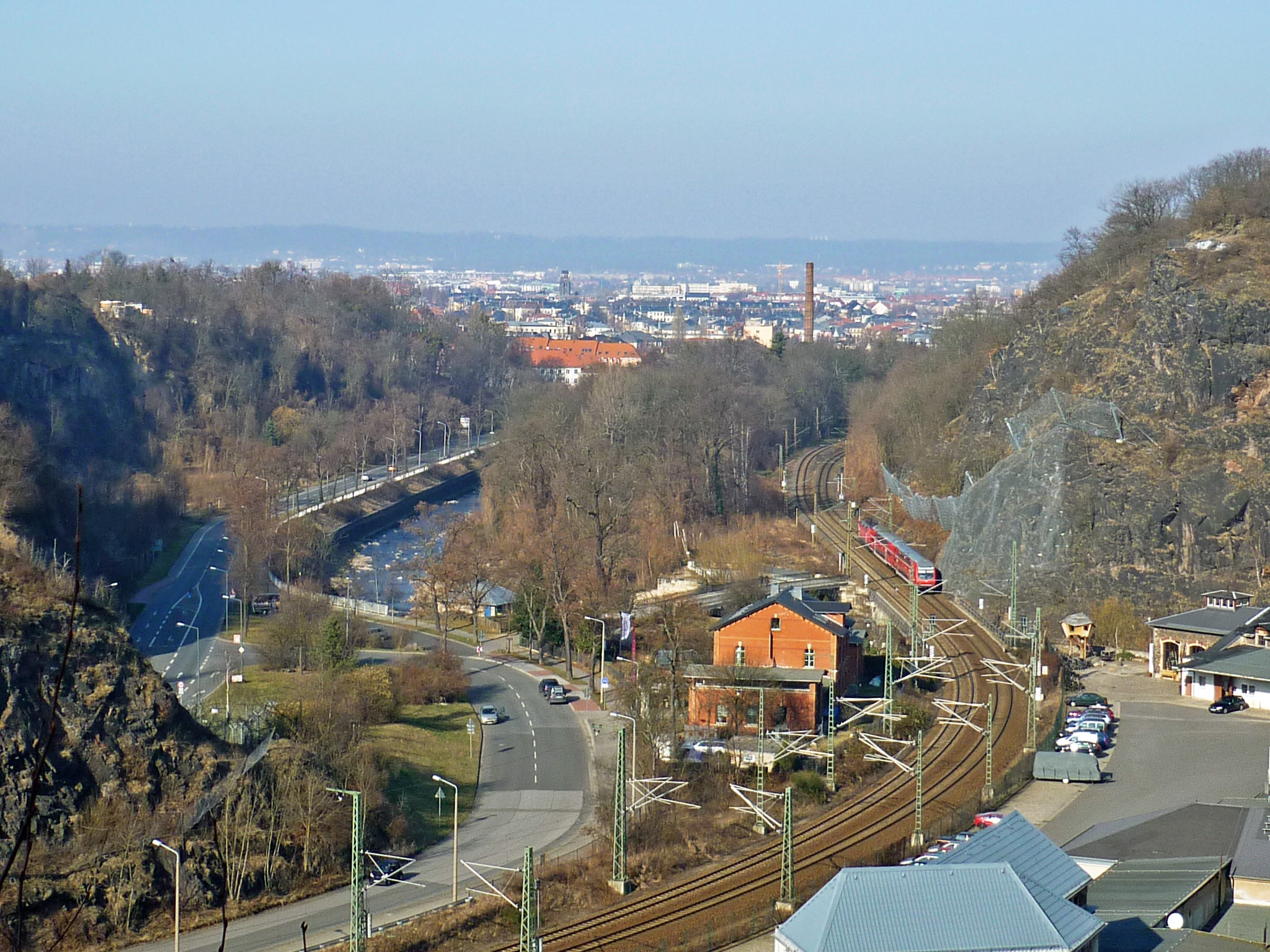
The renovated entrance building from 1897 at the first Dresden-Plauen station, which was active until 1926, as seen from south. The new station is located much closer to residential areas, approximately near the chimney in the picture's background.

The Haltepunkt Plauen bei Dresden ("Plauen near Dresden halt") was opened on 18 June 1855 together with the Albertsbahn (Albert's Railway) and was located to the left (south-east) of the railway. In 1897, the so-called Alte Bahnhof (old station) Plauen was opened with the station building located near the right-hand side of the current tracks. A few months later, the original building was demolished, when the connection to the Felsenkeller brewery was built there. A waiting room was erected in its place, which was moved to the Boderitz-Cunnersdorf halt of the Windbergbahn (Windberg Railway, a former mining railway now used as a heritage railway) in 1923 and still exists today (2016). In 1903, after the incorporation of the village of Plauen into Dresden, the station's name was changed to Dresden-Plauen. Since the station was located quite poorly for the population of Dresden-Plauen, which had now grown to 12,000 people, a new station was opened about 800 m further north in January 1926 and the old station was closed. This halt, opened in 1926, is to be renovated by the middle of 2018. The entrance building that was built in 1897 (the old station) was renovated in the late 1990s and today houses a glass workshop (2016).

== Services ==
=== Railway services ===
The station is currently served hourly by the RB 30 operated by Mitteldeutsche Regiobahn and Dresden S-Bahn S 3 service.

=== Local transport ===
Bus lines 62, 63 and 85 of Dresdner Verkehrsbetriebe frequently stop at this station.

== Future ==
DB will be carrying out a bridge replacement and station renovation project in 2020–2022. The current bridge is functionally obsolete. The Dresdner Verkehrsbetriebe (DVB) is considering extending the tram to make a direct connection with the S-Bahn as a part of Stadtbahnprogrammn 2020.
