= Freital =

City in Saxony, Germany

- Town
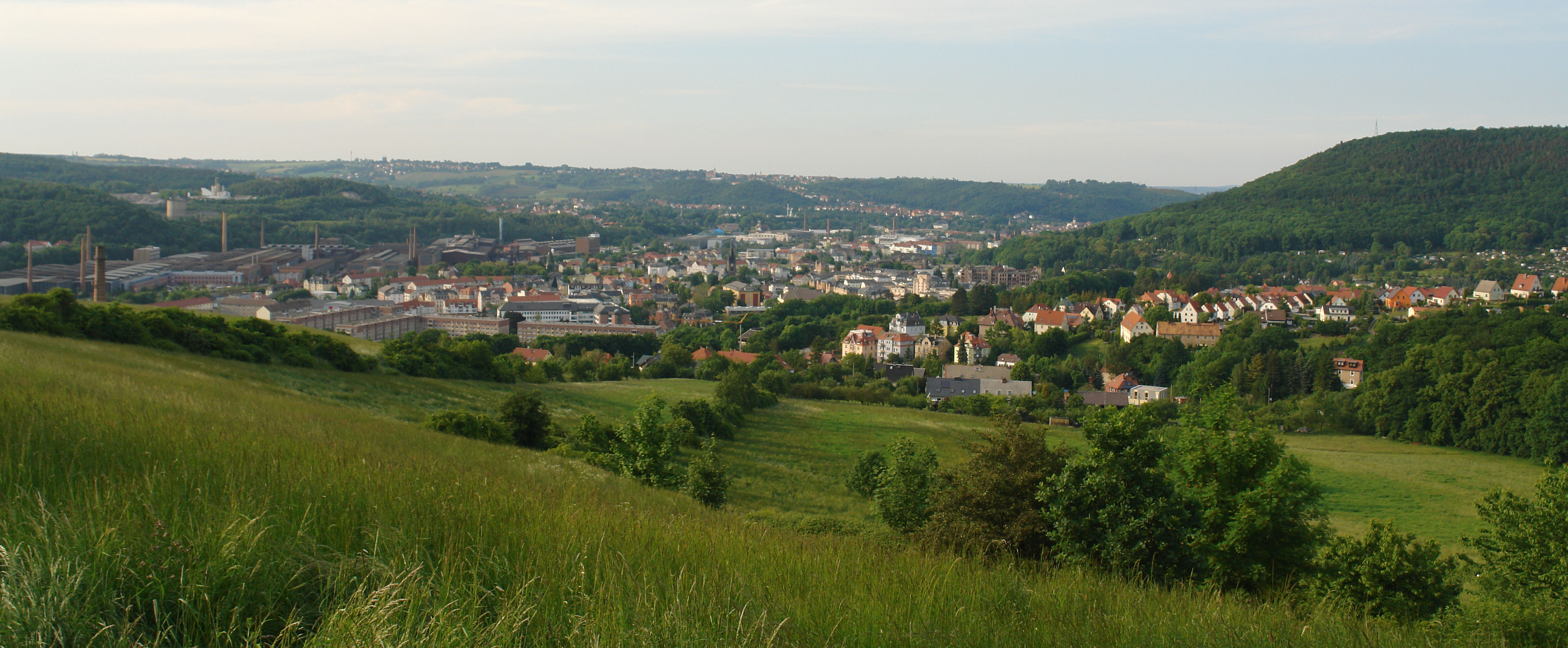
- Panorama

- Coat of arms

- Location of Freital within Sächsische Schweiz-Osterzgebirge district
- Interactive map of Freital
- Location within Germany Location within Saxony
- Coordinates: 51°1′N 13°39′E
- Country: Germany
- State: Saxony
- District: Sächsische Schweiz-Osterzgebirge
- Subdivisions: 15

Government
  - Mayor (2022–29): Uwe Rumberg

Area
  - Total: 40.45 km^{2} (15.62 sq mi)
- Elevation: 171 m (561 ft)

Population (2025-12-31)
  - Total: 39,174
  - Density: 968.5/km^{2} (2,508/sq mi)
- Time zone: UTC+01:00 (CET)
  - Summer (DST): UTC+02:00 (CEST)
- Postal codes: 01705
- Dialling codes: 0351
- Vehicle registration: PIR, DW, FTL, SEB
- Website: www.freital.de

Freital (German pronunciation: [ˈfʁaɪˌtaːl]) is a town in the district of Sächsische Schweiz-Osterzgebirge in Saxony, Germany. The town is situated on a small river, the Weißeritz, and is eight kilometres (5 mi) southwest of Dresden.

== Geography ==
Freital is located southwest of Dresden in the Döhlen Basin, through which the Weißeritz flows from south-west to north-east. The Windberg hill, is the town's local mountain and well-known landmark, rising about 100 metres (330 ft) above the valley floor. The lowest part of the town is the point where the Weißeritz enters the territory of the city of Dresden (about 195 metres (640 ft) above sea level).

The two rivers, the Red Weißeritz and Wild Weißeritz, merge in Hainsberg, a district of Freital. Other tributaries of the combined Weißeritz in the Freital area are the Wiederitz, Poisenbach and smaller, mainly canalized streams like the Vorholzbach, Burgker Bach, the Birkigter Bach, the Somsdorfer Bach and the Weißiger Bach. There are no natural lakes; the tailing pond near the slag heap and the Zauckerode retention basin were both constructed in the 20th century.

Geologically, the Döhlen Basin is a Rotliegendes depression that was formed at the end of the Carboniferous period. It is located between the Elbe Valley zone and the Ore Mountain gneiss massif.

=== Neighbouring municipalities ===
In the northeast Freital borders on the state capital of Dresden. Neighbouring municipalities in Sächsische Schweiz-Osterzgebirge are from the east and clockwise: Bannewitz, Rabenau, Höckendorf, Tharandt and Wilsdruff.

=== Municipal subdivisions ===
Subdivisions of Freital

Freital consists of the following Stadtteile (divisions):

- Birkigt
- Burgk (including Großburgk, Kleinburgk and Zschiedge)
- Deuben
- Döhlen
- Hainsberg (including Coßmannsdorf and Eckersdorf)
- Kleinnaundorf
- Niederhäslich
- Pesterwitz
- Potschappel (including Neucoschütz and Niederpesterwitz)
- Saalhausen
- Schweinsdorf
- Somsdorf
- Weißig (including Oberweißig and Unterweißig)
- Wurgwitz (including Kohlsdorf, Niederhermsdorf and Hammer)
- Zauckerode

== History ==
=== History of the former municipalities ===
The town's recorded history begins with the well-known Dresden Document (Dresdner Urkunde) of 1206 in which noblemen appear to be named after Potschappel, Döhlen and Wurgwitz. The fact that these are mentioned for the first time in the document is pure coincidence, because Potschappel and Wurgwitz had probably existed for several centuries, perhaps since the 9th century. There is no further mention of the lords of Potschappel until the year 1309, but the lords of Döhlen are referred to in 1228 with the appearance of Arnold "de Zukerade" (the first mention of Zauckerode). The Potschappel line may have become the lords of Sürßen, some of whom appear to have moved to Upper Lusatia. There is some likelihood that this was a line of vassals of the burgraves of Dohna, who were heavily involved in the colonisation and expansion of their estates in the areas of Rabenau and Dippoldiswalde. The lords of Wurgwitz, whose history is readily traceable, were simultaneously colonising land at the behest of the Bishop of Meissen and were - at least under Bruno of Porstendorf - close allies. According to the Dresden Document, other noblemen named after Wurgwitz are encountered until the 15th century. Most of the districts of Freital were mentioned for the first time in the 14th or even in the 15th century.

The early modern history of the present-day Freital is closely linked with the history of coal mining in the Döhlen Basin, which is part of the territory of Freital today. Mining was mentioned for the first time in 1549.

The ducal official, Hans Biener Moritz, was granted coal mining privileges by the Duke of Saxony. It has been passed down that coal had been discovered earlier, but only a few farmers were able to mine it from just below the surface in order to gather fuel for their own needs. In 1571, coal was mined for the first time in Burgk and then three years later in Potschappel. When the upper seams of coal were exhausted the shafts fell into disuse.

In 1743, the so-called coal mandate was passed, which gave landowners the right to mine the coal on their property. By the mid-18th century, about 30 small businesses had been founded, but due to their small size and insufficient experience they were fared poorly in the face of competition.

This situation changed with the onset of industrialisation. The Kingdom of Saxony wanted its share. In 1799, the Leopold-Erbstolln pit was acquired, followed in 1806 by the estates of Zauckerode and Döhlen, together with all the mining rights in the Potschappel coal fields. By 1822, all companies west of the Weißeritz had been added. From the many small businesses, a single, large enterprise had now been created, the "Royal Saxon Coal Company of Zauckerode" (Königlich–Sächsisches Steinkohlenwerk Zauckerode).

On the other side of the Weißeritz, businesses merged in 1819, when Carl Friedrich August Krebß (later Baron of Burgk) became the new owner of the manor at Burgk. He inherited five mineshafts and bought nearby coalfields. Afterwards he founded the "Baron of Burgke Coal and Iron Works" (Freiherrlich von Burgker Steinkohlen- und Eisenhüttenwerke).

During this centralization of ownership, there was rapid development in technology and the related industry. The upswing was economically so significant that coal mining around the area of Plauen (Plauenscher Grund) was technically and organizationally ranked among the best in Germany for several decades, roughly until the 1870s. There were many technical innovations, such as the "wet jigger" (nasse Siebsetzer) in 1810 and the first steam engines in 1820.

In 1823, coal began to be coked in Burgk and, from 1828, the first gas was produced. As a result, Burgk, became the first village in the world to have public gas lighting. In 1842, the first Saxon smelting furnace entered service. It was located in the area of Burgk iron works. In order to extract the large quantities of water from the pits, water management structures had to be built, such as the Tiefe-Weißeritz-Stolln (1800–1838) and the Tiefe Elbstolln (1817–1836).

On 2 August 1869, there was a firedamp explosion in the pits of Segen-Gottes-Schaft and Neuhoffnungschacht in the Burgk coal mines, in which 276 miners died. This disaster is recalled by a recalled a monument at the Segen-Gottes-Schaft near the Windberg.

=== Foundation of Freital ===
On 1 October 1921 the villages of Deuben, Döhlen and Potschappel merged to form the town of Freital. The first discussions about such a merger had taken place at the end of the 19th century. Because no name for the new town had been accepted, there was a competition for the best name. Suggestions included "Deupodö-Stadt" (by Deuben, Potschappel and Döhlen), or "Dreistadt". In the end, a proposal by town councillor Herman Henker to call the new town "Freital" ("free valley") was accepted.

In 1924, Freital, which had hitherto come under the district (Amtshauptmannschaft) of Dresden-Altstadt, was made an independent town within the Kreishauptmannstadt of Dresden.

Since imperial times, the town developed, in the Weimar period, into a hotbed of social democracy. In the Weimar Republic, Freital was the only town in Saxony with a socialist mayor, because the Communists were not as strongly represented as in the rest of Saxony. The first mayor of Freital was Dr. Carl Wedderkopf. His term of office ran from 1921 until 1927. He was followed by Gustav Klimpel, also a Social Democrat, who held this office until 1933. Almost one in ten townsfolk are members of the SPD, which ran a large number of clubs and leisure activities and turned Freital into a "welfare island". From 1933 to 1945, there were numerous pockets of resistance in Freital and the surrounding area. By the end of the Nazi era, almost 3000 people were in the SPD, but after the forced merger of the SPD and KPD into the SED, the new party achieved a clear majority in the first elections. SED rule, however, virtually erased memories of those early beginnings. In 1990, the SPD only won 10% of the votes. Neither is there anything left of the leisure scene shaped by those socialist works clubs.

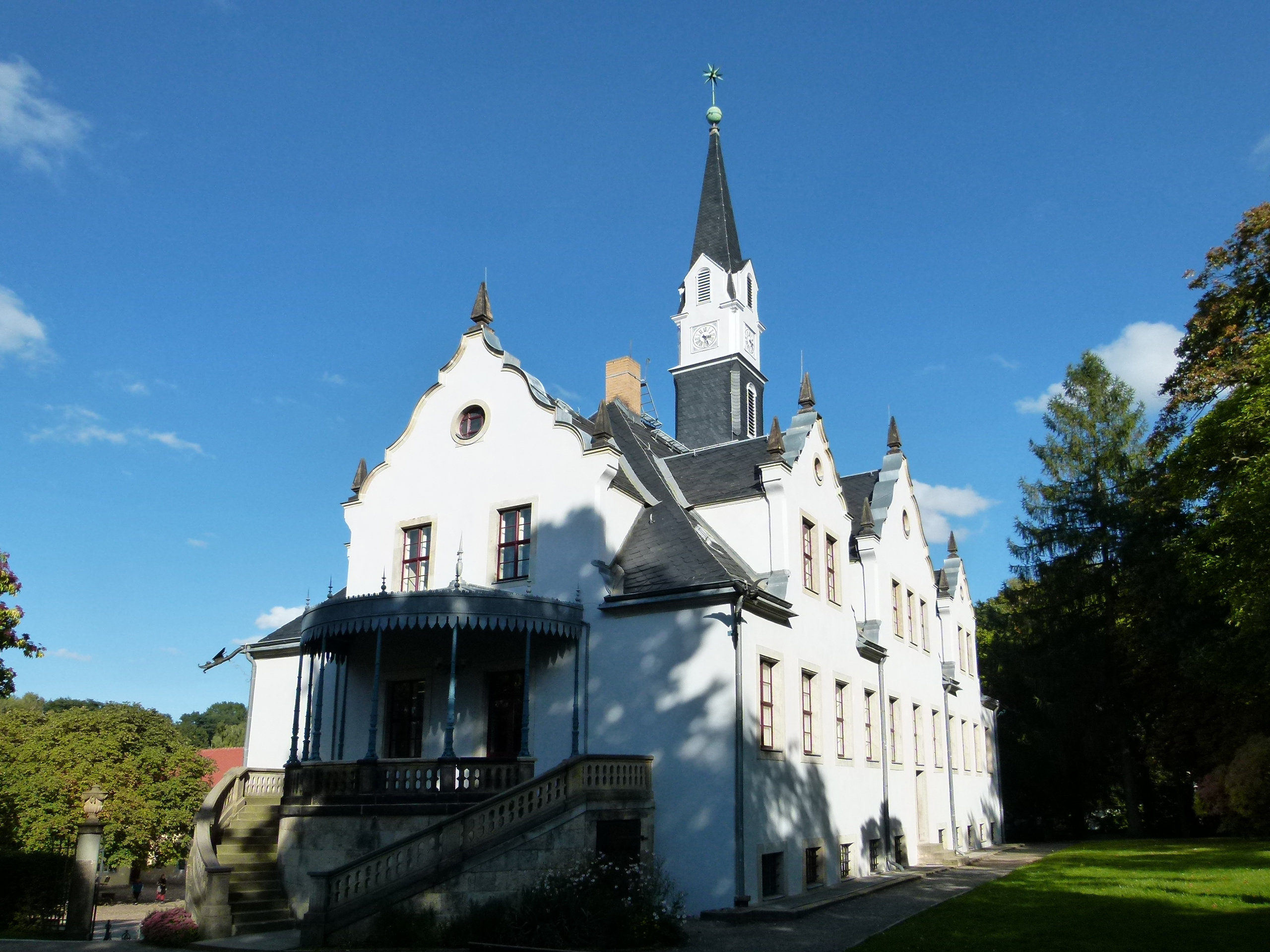
Burgk castle

=== Far right activities in Freital ===
In 2015 over weeks reactionary citizens rallied together with neo-fascists in Freital to protest a refugee home. In 2018 a federal prosecutor jailed eight members of the far-right terrorist group called "Gruppe Freital", for a number of crimes including attempted murder and terror offences. Prosecutors said the group's members attempted to create a "climate of fear" with a series of attacks on their enemies, political opponents and refugees.

== Notable people ==
=== Born in Freital ===
- Oskar Böhme (1870–1938), German composer and trumpeter
- Cornelius Schnauber (born 1938), German scholar, historian, playwright, biographer and educator
- Uwe Bewersdorf (born 1958), former German pair skater
- Jens Kruppa (born 1976), German breaststroke swimmer
- Kerstin Tzscherlich (born 1978), German female volleyball player
- Tom Starke (born 1981), German football goalkeeper
- Felix Michel (born 1984), German slalom canoer

=== Famous residents ===
- Wilhelmine Reichard (1788–1848), first German female balloonist
- Heinrich Zille (1858–1929), German illustrator and photographer, lived 1865 in Potschappel

== International relations ==
=== Twin towns – Sister cities ===
Freital is twinned with:

- Baden-Baden, Germany
- Oberhausen, Germany
