= Battle of Dahlenkirchen =

1812 battle during the French invasion of Russia

- Part of the French invasion of Russia
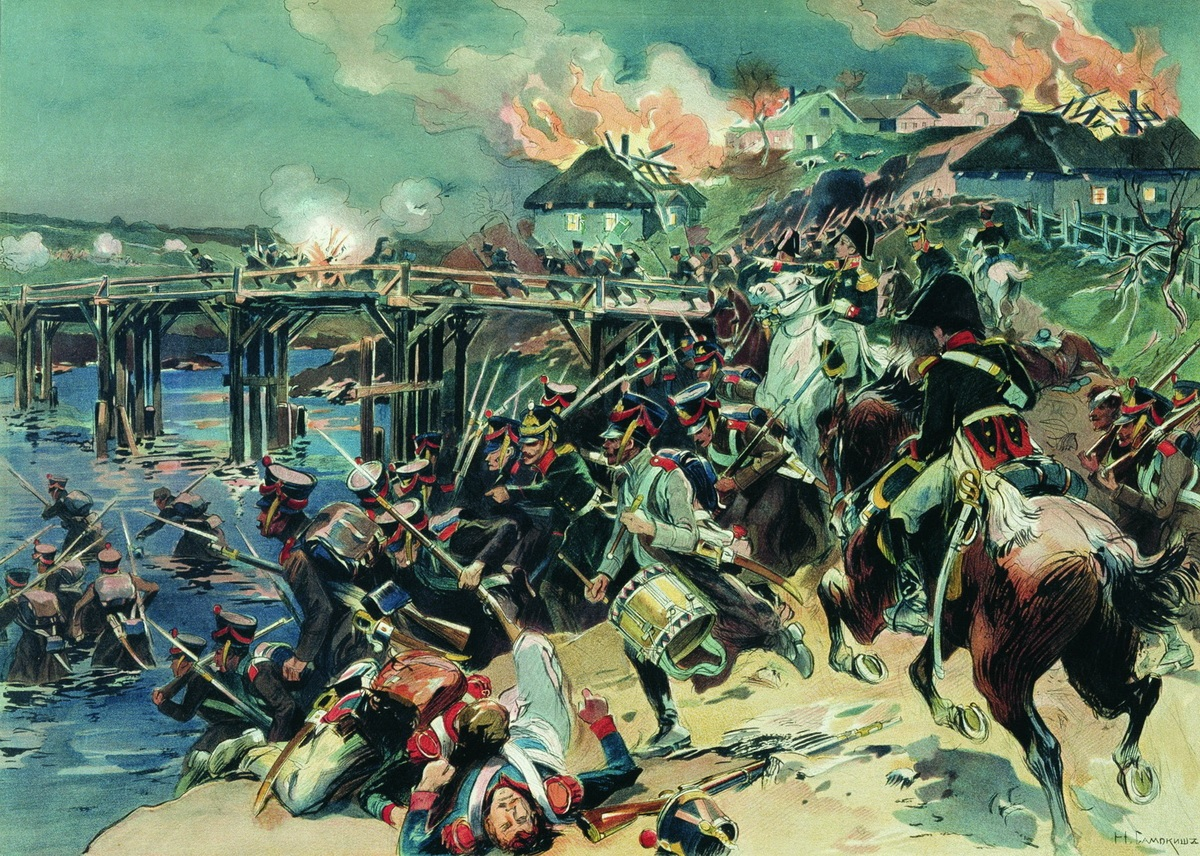
- Painting by Nikolay Samokish
Date	22 August 1812
Location	village southeast of Riga on the left bank of the Daugava, Russian Empire 56.9428°N 24.0966°E
Result	Russian victory

Belligerents
(First French Empire) French Empire (Kingdom of Prussia) Prussia	Russian Empire

Commanders and leaders
(First French Empire) Jacques MacDonald (Kingdom of Prussia) Julius von Grawert	(Russian Empire) Magnus Gustav von Essen

Strength
1,500; 8 cannons	6,000

Casualties and losses
800	300

French invasion of Russia
current battle
Prussian corps
Napoleon
Austrian corps

The Battle of Dahlenkirchen took place on 22 August 1812, between French and allied troops, with a victory of the Russian army of about 6,000 against the French about 1,500 strong.

== Battle ==
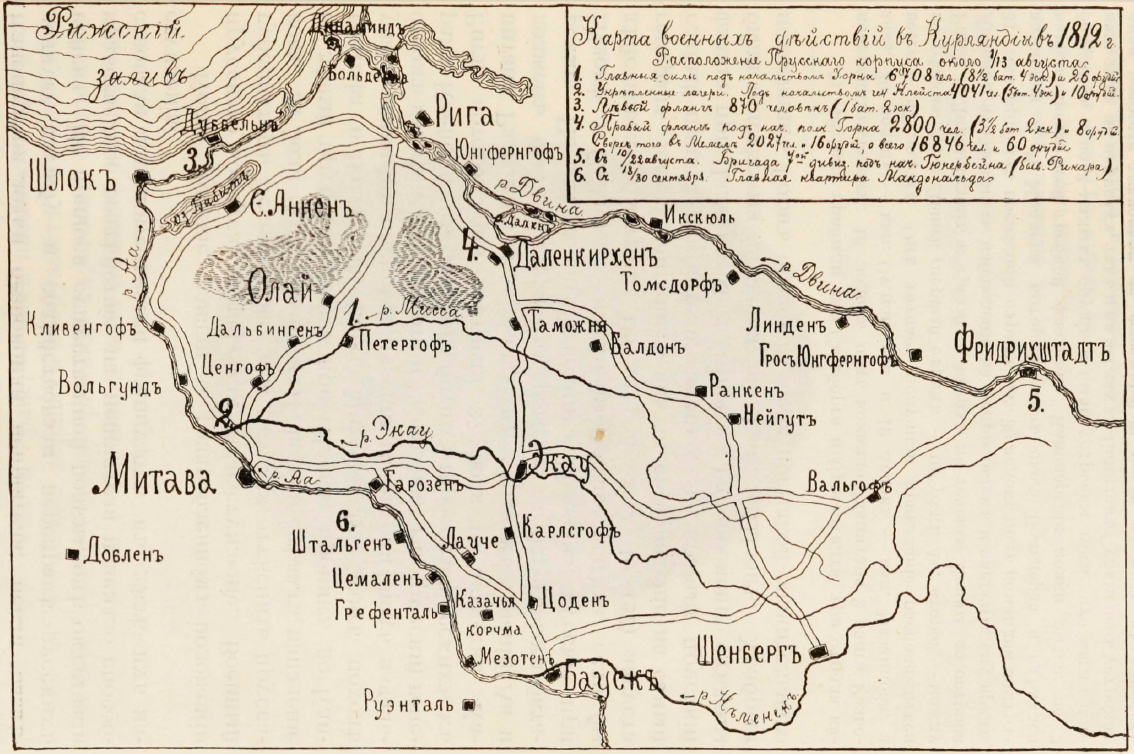
Position of armies in Courland as of Summer 1812

On 22 August 1812 a Russian attack took place on the right wing of the Prussians at Dahlenkirchen and Olai, and at the same time on the left wing at Schlock and St.Annen. On the right wing, Colonel Horn was completely surprised, and after some resistance he had to retreat. Ultimately, the Prussians were able to stop the attacks, but they gave up Dahlenkirchen because they could not defend it.

== Aftermath ==
The unsuccessful siege of Riga went on.

== See also ==
- List of battles of the French invasion of Russia

== External sources ==
- Armeekorps (2021). "Tagebuch des königlich preussischen Armeekorps" (in German).

== In popular culture ==
http://www.kurpfalz-feldherren.de/artikel/gefecht-bei-dahlenkirchen-napoleonisch-black-powder-spiel-vom-26032016-teil-1
