= Wurgwitz =

District of Freital, Germany

Coordinates: 51°01′31″N 13°37′41″E

Locator map of Wurgwitz in Freital

Wurgwitz is a district of the Saxon city Freital in Sächsische Schweiz-Osterzgebirge district.

== Geography ==
=== Local level ===
Wurgwitz consists of three other villages:

- Niederhermsdorf
- Hammer
- Kohlsdorf

== History ==
Wurgwitz was first mentioned at 31 March 1206 together with Dresden, Freital-Potschappel and other villages and towns. Since then, the names of Wurgwitz, Niederhermsdorf and Kohlsdorf repeatedly changed:

Wurgwitz:

- 1206: Hermannu de Worganewiz
- 1303: miles Henricus de Woganewytz
- 1308: Heynrich von Wrganuwicz
- 1378: Worganwicz / Worgenewicz
- 1445: Worgewicz
- 1461: Wurgenwicz
- 1648: Wurgewitz
- 1791: Wurgwitz

Kohlsdorf:

- 1450: Colostorff
- 1469: Kolßdorff
- 1470: Quolsdorff
- 1485: Coelßdorff
- 1514: Colßdorff
- 1587: Kuelßdorf
- 1616: zu Culßdorff
- 1791: Kohlsdorf

Niederhermsdorf

- 1350: Hermannsdorf
- 1381: Nydern Hermannsdorf
- 1445: Nidder Hermestorf
- 1461: Hermstorff
- 1679: Niederhernsdorff
- since Niederhermsdorf

On 7 July 1921 merged the three villages together and formed the village Wurgwitz now, 53 years still remained independent until Wurgwitz in 1974 from Freital incorporated.

=== Residents ===
Year	Residents
1828	150
1834	192
1840	203
1849	213
1858	252
1867	323
1880	452
1890	550
1921	1026
1945	2800
2005	2600
