= Weißig (Freital) =

Coordinates: 51°00′10″N 13°36′56″E

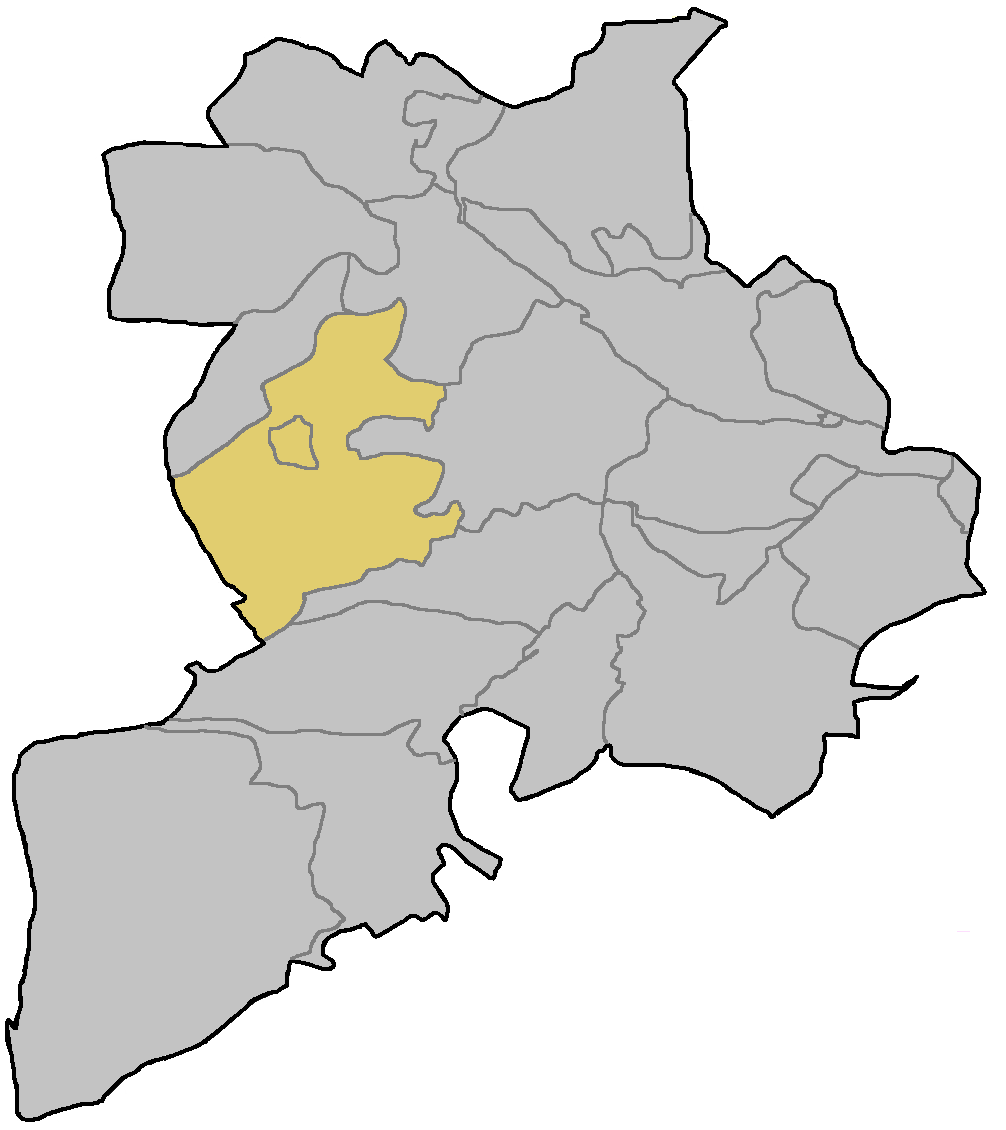
Locator map

Weißig is a municipal subdivision of Freital in Sächsische Schweiz-Osterzgebirge district. It consists of two other villages, Oberweißig and Unterweißig.

== History ==
The village was first mentioned in 1235. Since 1 January 1974, Weißig has been a municipal subdivision of Freital.

=== Population ===
Oberweißig	Unterweißig	Weißig
1834: 165; 1871: 338; 1890: 380; 1910: 574	1834: 373; 1871: 736; 1890: 748; 1910: 850	1925: 1,698; 1939: 1,591; 1946: 1,613; 1950: 1,649; 1964: 1,412
