= Franquemont (disambiguation) =

Franquemont may refer to:

== Places ==
- Franquemont, ancient lordship on the banks of the river Doubs in present France and Switzerland

== People ==
- Abby Franquemont (born 1972), American textile crafts writer and author
- Frederic von Franquemont (1770-1842), Württemberg Infantry General
