= Six Days' Campaign order of battle =

Six Days Campaign
- Part of the 1814 campaign in north-east France
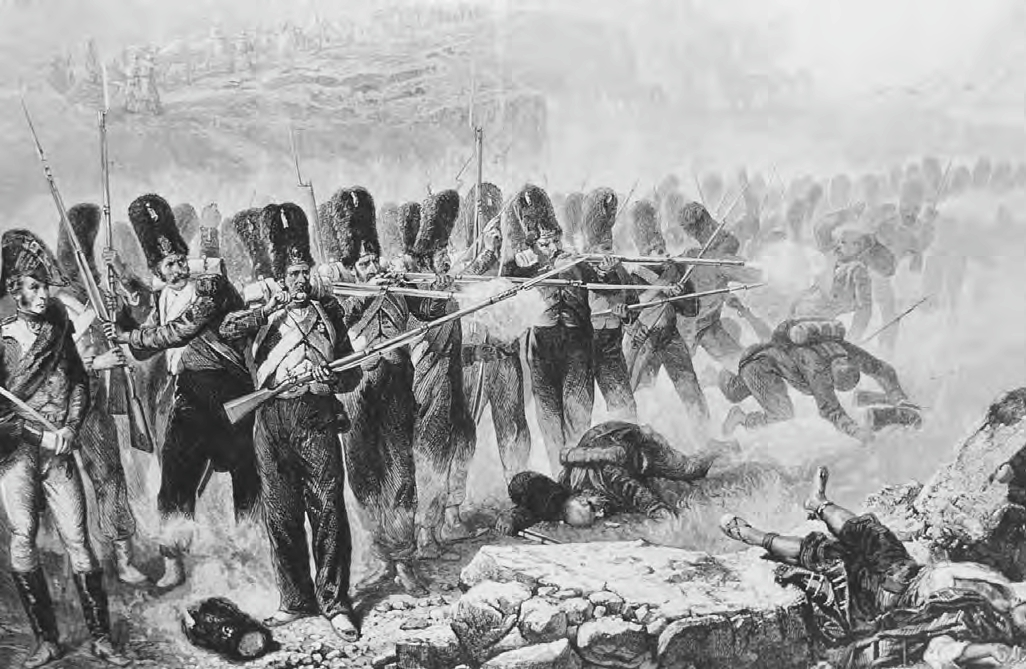
- French Old Guard infantry on the firing line. Napoleon made extensive use of the Imperial Guard during the Six Days' campaign.
Date	10–15 February 1814
Location	Northeastern France
Result	French victory

Belligerents
France	Prussia; Russia

Commanders and leaders
(First French Empire) Emperor Napoleon	(Kingdom of Prussia) Gebhard von Blücher

Strength
30,000 men	56,000 men

Casualties and losses
3,800	14,034–28,500; 52–60 guns

The Six Days' Campaign saw four victories by the Imperial French army led by Napoleon over the Army of Silesia commanded by Prussian Field Marshal Gebhard Leberecht von Blücher. Between 10 and 15 February 1814, the French inflicted losses of at least 14,034 men and 52 guns on the Army of Silesia. A second estimate listed 16,000 casualties and 60 guns. A third estimate reached as high as 20,000 casualties, but a calculation by historian George Nafziger suggested that Blücher may have lost 28,500 soldiers.

After their victory over Napoleon in the Battle of La Rothière on 1 February 1814, the two main Allied armies separated. Austrian Field Marshal Karl Philipp, Prince of Schwarzenberg's Army of Bohemia marched west toward Troyes while Blücher's Army of Silesia moved north to Châlons-sur Marne and turned west along the Marne River, aiming for Meaux. Leaving 39,000 troops to watch the cautious Schwarzenberg, Napoleon assembled a strike force of 20,000 infantry and 10,000 cavalry to deal with the more aggressive Blücher. By the evening of 8 February, the Army of Silesia was spread along a line of march 44 miles (71 km) long. Fabian Gottlieb von Osten-Sacken's 20,000 Russians led the column, followed by Ludwig Yorck von Wartenburg's 18,000 Prussians, Zakhar Dmitrievich Olsufiev's 4,000 Russians, Peter Mikhailovich Kaptzevich's Russians and Friedrich Graf Kleist von Nollendorf's Prussians, the last two forces totaling 15,000 men.

== Organization ==
=== Russian ===
The Russian forces were organized into army corps with infantry corps and cavalry corps subordinated to it. The full structure can be seen in the Sacken's Russian order of battle section. The Russian IX Infantry Corps, as shown in the Olsufiev's Russian order of battle section, and the Russian X Corps, as shown in the Kaptzevich's Russian order of battle section, both reported to their superior, General-Leutnant Louis Alexandre Andrault de Langeron. Since Langeron did not appear in the theater of operations until late February, they temporarily reported directly to Blücher.

In the Russian army, artillery batteries were organized with 12 pieces each. In 1805, Aleksey Arakcheyev introduced a new range of field artillery that consisted of 6- and 12-pounder cannons and 10- and 20-pounder licornes, a gun similar to a howitzer. An Allied order of battle from 1 January 1814 noted that Light Batteries were armed with 6-pounders. The same list stated that of five Position Batteries in one army corps, three had 12 guns, one had 11 guns, and one had seven guns. In the Russian 3rd Dragoon Division, Horse Battery Nr. 18 was armed with only 10 guns, but usually the specific number of guns in a battery was not stated.

=== Prussian ===
When the Prussian army was rebuilt after the disastrous War of the Fourth Coalition, its reduced establishment did not allow for the formation of divisions. Therefore, the next tactical unit below corps level became the brigade, which included both cavalry and artillery. Batteries were formed from six 6- or 12-pounder cannons and two 7- or 10-pounder howitzers. Artillery batteries that were not assigned to the brigades were posted to the corps reserve. By 1813, each corps incorporated four brigades and included a mix of regular and Landwehr units.

=== French ===
A French order of battle from 6 January 1814 showed 10 Young Guard Foot Artillery and one Old Guard Foot Artillery companies each armed with six 6-pounder guns and two howitzers. There were four Old Guard Foot Artillery companies armed with six 12-pounder guns and two howitzers. Six Old Guard Horse Artillery companies were each armed with four 6-pounder guns and two howitzers. Eight guns per foot artillery company and six guns per horse artillery company represented the standard French organization. However, at the Battle of La Rothière on 1 February, the Allies captured 50–60 French guns. Which artillery companies lost guns was not stated.

== Battle of Champaubert ==
Napoleon with 30,000 men and 120 guns surprised Olsufiev south of Champaubert on the morning of 10 February. Unwisely, Olsufiev decided to fight it out, hoping for help from Blücher. By 3:00 pm the Russians were forced back through Champaubert. Too late, Olsufiev tried to retreat east to Étoges, but found both flanks enveloped by French cavalry. Olsufiev lost as many as 4,000 men out of 5,000 troops, or as few as 2,400 and nine guns out of a total of 3,700 men and 24 guns. Olsufiev and Prince Konstantin Poltoratsky ended the day as French prisoners. French losses were about 600.

=== Olsufiev's Russian order of battle ===
Olsufiev's command at Champaubert
Corps	Division	Brigade	Regiment	Strength
IX Infantry Corps; Lieutenant General; Zakhar Dmitrievich Olsufiev (POW)	IX Corps Artillery	Not Brigaded	Position Battery Nr. 15 not present	12 guns
IX Infantry Corps; Lieutenant General; Zakhar Dmitrievich Olsufiev (POW)	IX Corps Artillery	Not Brigaded	Light Battery Nr. 13	12 guns
IX Infantry Corps; Lieutenant General; Zakhar Dmitrievich Olsufiev (POW)	IX Corps Artillery	Not Brigaded	Light Battery Nr. 24	12 guns
IX Infantry Corps; Lieutenant General; Zakhar Dmitrievich Olsufiev (POW)	9th Infantry Division; General-major; Evstafi Evstafievich Udom II	General-major Konstantin Poltoratsky (POW)	Apsheron Infantry Regiment	486
IX Infantry Corps; Lieutenant General; Zakhar Dmitrievich Olsufiev (POW)	9th Infantry Division; General-major; Evstafi Evstafievich Udom II	General-major Konstantin Poltoratsky (POW)	Nacheburg Infantry Regiment	563
IX Infantry Corps; Lieutenant General; Zakhar Dmitrievich Olsufiev (POW)	9th Infantry Division; General-major; Evstafi Evstafievich Udom II	General-major Juschkov II	Riazsk Infantry Regiment	620
IX Infantry Corps; Lieutenant General; Zakhar Dmitrievich Olsufiev (POW)	9th Infantry Division; General-major; Evstafi Evstafievich Udom II	General-major Juschkov II	Yakutsk Infantry Regiment	533
IX Infantry Corps; Lieutenant General; Zakhar Dmitrievich Olsufiev (POW)	9th Infantry Division; General-major; Evstafi Evstafievich Udom II	Major Melnik	10th Jäger Regiment	335
IX Infantry Corps; Lieutenant General; Zakhar Dmitrievich Olsufiev (POW)	9th Infantry Division; General-major; Evstafi Evstafievich Udom II	Major Melnik	38th Jäger Regiment	472
IX Infantry Corps; Lieutenant General; Zakhar Dmitrievich Olsufiev (POW)	15th Infantry Division; General-major; Peter Yakovlevich Kornilov	Lieutenant Colonel Anensur	Vitebsk Infantry Regiment	372
IX Infantry Corps; Lieutenant General; Zakhar Dmitrievich Olsufiev (POW)	15th Infantry Division; General-major; Peter Yakovlevich Kornilov	Lieutenant Colonel Anensur	Kozlov Infantry Regiment	504
IX Infantry Corps; Lieutenant General; Zakhar Dmitrievich Olsufiev (POW)	15th Infantry Division; General-major; Peter Yakovlevich Kornilov	General-major Mussin-Pushkin	Kolyvan Infantry Regiment	417
IX Infantry Corps; Lieutenant General; Zakhar Dmitrievich Olsufiev (POW)	15th Infantry Division; General-major; Peter Yakovlevich Kornilov	General-major Mussin-Pushkin	Kourin Infantry Regiment	417
IX Infantry Corps; Lieutenant General; Zakhar Dmitrievich Olsufiev (POW)	15th Infantry Division; General-major; Peter Yakovlevich Kornilov	Colonel Tuchanowski	12th Jäger Regiment	447
IX Infantry Corps; Lieutenant General; Zakhar Dmitrievich Olsufiev (POW)	15th Infantry Division; General-major; Peter Yakovlevich Kornilov	Colonel Tuchanowski	22nd Jäger Regiment	unknown

=== French Army order of battle ===
Commander-in-chief: Emperor Napoleon
Chief of Staff: Marshal Louis-Alexandre Berthier

The units available to fight at Champaubert were the 1st Old Guard Division, the Guard artillery, the 1st and 3rd Guard Cavalry Divisions, the 1st and 2nd Young Guard Divisions, both divisions of the VI Corps, both divisions of the I Cavalry Corps, and Cyrille-Simon Picquet's cavalry brigade.

After General of Division Pierre Decouz was killed at the Battle of Brienne, General of Brigade Jean-Jacques Germain Pelet-Clozeau temporarily commanded the 2nd Young Guard Division through the battles of 10–11 February. Then he was reassigned to lead a brigade in the 1st Old Guard Division.

Napoleon's Army in the Six Days' Campaign
Corps	Division	Strength	Brigade	Regiment	Strength
Old Guard; Marshal; Édouard Mortier	1st Old Guard Division; General of Division; Louis Friant	4,796	1st Brigade; General of Brigade; Pierre Cambronne	I, II / 1st Guard Foot Chasseur Regiment	1,265
Old Guard; Marshal; Édouard Mortier	1st Old Guard Division; General of Division; Louis Friant	4,796	1st Brigade; General of Brigade; Pierre Cambronne	I, II / 2nd Guard Foot Chasseur Regiment	898
Old Guard; Marshal; Édouard Mortier	1st Old Guard Division; General of Division; Louis Friant	4,796	2nd Brigade; General of Brigade; Jean-Martin Petit	I, II / 1st Guard Foot Grenadier Regiment	1,393
Old Guard; Marshal; Édouard Mortier	1st Old Guard Division; General of Division; Louis Friant	4,796	2nd Brigade; General of Brigade; Jean-Martin Petit	I, II / 2nd Guard Foot Grenadier Regiment	1,044
Old Guard; Marshal; Édouard Mortier	1st Old Guard Division; General of Division; Louis Friant	4,796	Attached units	Guard Sapper Battalion, 1st, 2nd & 3rd Companies	105
Old Guard; Marshal; Édouard Mortier	1st Old Guard Division; General of Division; Louis Friant	4,796	Attached units	Guard Marine Battalion, 3rd Company	-
Old Guard; Marshal; Édouard Mortier	1st Old Guard Division; General of Division; Louis Friant	4,796	Attached units	Guard Engineering Train	-
Old Guard; Marshal; Édouard Mortier	2nd Old Guard Division; General of Division; Claude-Étienne Michel (WIA) followed by: Charles-Joseph Christiani	3,878; 6 guns	General of Brigade; Jean Louis Gros	Fusilier-Chasseur Regiment	1,366
Old Guard; Marshal; Édouard Mortier	2nd Old Guard Division; General of Division; Claude-Étienne Michel (WIA) followed by: Charles-Joseph Christiani	3,878; 6 guns	General of Brigade; Jean Louis Gros	Fusilier-Grenadier Regiment	688
Old Guard; Marshal; Édouard Mortier	2nd Old Guard Division; General of Division; Claude-Étienne Michel (WIA) followed by: Charles-Joseph Christiani	3,878; 6 guns	General of Brigade; Charles-Joseph Christiani	Flanqueuer-Chasseur Regiment	1,042
Old Guard; Marshal; Édouard Mortier	2nd Old Guard Division; General of Division; Claude-Étienne Michel (WIA) followed by: Charles-Joseph Christiani	3,878; 6 guns	General of Brigade; Charles-Joseph Christiani	Flanqueuer-Grenadier Regiment	285
Old Guard; Marshal; Édouard Mortier	2nd Old Guard Division; General of Division; Claude-Étienne Michel (WIA) followed by: Charles-Joseph Christiani	3,878; 6 guns	General of Brigade; Charles-Joseph Christiani	Velites of Turin	333
Old Guard; Marshal; Édouard Mortier	2nd Old Guard Division; General of Division; Claude-Étienne Michel (WIA) followed by: Charles-Joseph Christiani	3,878; 6 guns	General of Brigade; Charles-Joseph Christiani	Velites of Florence	164
Old Guard; Marshal; Édouard Mortier	2nd Old Guard Division; General of Division; Claude-Étienne Michel (WIA) followed by: Charles-Joseph Christiani	3,878; 6 guns	Artillery; Captain Eggerlé	1st Young Guard Company; 4 6-pounder guns & 2 24-pound howitzers	73, 6 guns
Old Guard; Marshal; Édouard Mortier	2nd Old Guard Division; General of Division; Claude-Étienne Michel (WIA) followed by: Charles-Joseph Christiani	3,878; 6 guns	Artillery; Captain Eggerlé	Guard Train Detachment	81
Old Guard; Marshal; Édouard Mortier	Artillery	1,464	Not Brigaded	Guard Foot Artillery, 7 companies	459
Old Guard; Marshal; Édouard Mortier	Artillery	1,464	Not Brigaded	Horse Artillery, 4 companies	319
Old Guard; Marshal; Édouard Mortier	Artillery	1,464	Not Brigaded	Train and pontooneers	686
Young Guard; Marshal; Michel Ney	1st Young Guard Division; General of Division; Claude Marie Meunier	4,133	1st Brigade; General of Brigade; Jean Étienne Clément-Lacoste	I, II / 1st Voltiguer Regiment	657
Young Guard; Marshal; Michel Ney	1st Young Guard Division; General of Division; Claude Marie Meunier	4,133	1st Brigade; General of Brigade; Jean Étienne Clément-Lacoste	I, II / 2nd Voltiguer Regiment	940
Young Guard; Marshal; Michel Ney	1st Young Guard Division; General of Division; Claude Marie Meunier	4,133	2nd Brigade; General of Brigade; Guillaume-Charles Rousseau	I, II / 3rd Voltiguer Regiment	1,263
Young Guard; Marshal; Michel Ney	1st Young Guard Division; General of Division; Claude Marie Meunier	4,133	2nd Brigade; General of Brigade; Guillaume-Charles Rousseau	I, II / 4th Voltiguer Regiment	1,144
Young Guard; Marshal; Michel Ney	2nd Young Guard Division; General of Division; Philibert Jean-Baptiste Curial	2,840	1st Brigade; General of Brigade; Jean-Jacques Pelet	I, II / 5th Voltiguer Regiment	680
Young Guard; Marshal; Michel Ney	2nd Young Guard Division; General of Division; Philibert Jean-Baptiste Curial	2,840	1st Brigade; General of Brigade; Jean-Jacques Pelet	I, II / 6th Voltiguer Regiment	633
Young Guard; Marshal; Michel Ney	2nd Young Guard Division; General of Division; Philibert Jean-Baptiste Curial	2,840	2nd Brigade; General of Brigade; Auguste Julien Bigarré	I, II / 7th Voltiguer Regiment	717
Young Guard; Marshal; Michel Ney	2nd Young Guard Division; General of Division; Philibert Jean-Baptiste Curial	2,840	2nd Brigade; General of Brigade; Auguste Julien Bigarré	I, II / 8th Voltiguer Regiment	670
Guard Cavalry; General of Division; Étienne de Nansouty	1st Guard Cavalry Division; General of Division; Pierre de Colbert	2,582	Brigades unknown	2nd Éclaireur Regiment	-
Guard Cavalry; General of Division; Étienne de Nansouty	1st Guard Cavalry Division; General of Division; Pierre de Colbert	2,582	Brigades unknown	2nd Chevau-léger Lancer Regiment	-
Guard Cavalry; General of Division; Étienne de Nansouty	1st Guard Cavalry Division; General of Division; Pierre de Colbert	2,582	Brigades unknown	Guard Chasseurs à Cheval Regiment	-
Guard Cavalry; General of Division; Étienne de Nansouty	1st Guard Cavalry Division; General of Division; Pierre de Colbert	2,582	Brigades unknown	Guard Horse Grenadier Regiment	-
Guard Cavalry; General of Division; Étienne de Nansouty	1st Guard Cavalry Division; General of Division; Pierre de Colbert	2,582	Brigades unknown	Guard Dragoon Regiment	-
Guard Cavalry; General of Division; Étienne de Nansouty	2nd Guard Cavalry Division; General of Division; Charles Lefebvre-Desnouettes	3,535	Brigades unknown	1st Guard Lancer Regiment	680
Guard Cavalry; General of Division; Étienne de Nansouty	2nd Guard Cavalry Division; General of Division; Charles Lefebvre-Desnouettes	3,535	Brigades unknown	Guard Chasseurs à Cheval Regiment	667
Guard Cavalry; General of Division; Étienne de Nansouty	2nd Guard Cavalry Division; General of Division; Charles Lefebvre-Desnouettes	3,535	Brigades unknown	Guard Dragoon Regiment	800
Guard Cavalry; General of Division; Étienne de Nansouty	2nd Guard Cavalry Division; General of Division; Charles Lefebvre-Desnouettes	3,535	Brigades unknown	Guard Horse Grenadier Regiment	954
Guard Cavalry; General of Division; Étienne de Nansouty	2nd Guard Cavalry Division; General of Division; Charles Lefebvre-Desnouettes	3,535	Brigades unknown	Gendarmes d'Elite Regiment	434
Guard Cavalry; General of Division; Étienne de Nansouty	3rd Guard Cavalry Division; General of Division; Louis Laferrière-Levêque	2,164	1st Brigade; General of Brigade; Jean Dieudonné Lion	Guard Chasseurs à Cheval Regiment	542
Guard Cavalry; General of Division; Étienne de Nansouty	3rd Guard Cavalry Division; General of Division; Louis Laferrière-Levêque	2,164	1st Brigade; General of Brigade; Jean Dieudonné Lion	Guard Dragoon Regiment	735
Guard Cavalry; General of Division; Étienne de Nansouty	3rd Guard Cavalry Division; General of Division; Louis Laferrière-Levêque	2,164	2nd Brigade; General of Brigade; Louis-Michel Letort de Lorville	Guard Horse Grenadier Regiment	887
I Cavalry Corps; General of Division; Jean-Pierre Doumerc followed by: Étienne de Bordesoulle	1st Light Cavalry Division; General of Division; Christophe Antoine Merlin	704	1st Brigade; General of Brigade; François Isidore Wathiez	6th, 7th & 8th Hussar Regiments; 1st, 3rd, 5th & 8th Chevau-léger Lancier Regiments; 16th Chasseurs à Cheval Regiment	272
I Cavalry Corps; General of Division; Jean-Pierre Doumerc followed by: Étienne de Bordesoulle	1st Light Cavalry Division; General of Division; Christophe Antoine Merlin	704	2nd Brigade; General of Brigade; Claude Raymond Guyon	1st, 2nd & 3rd Chasseurs à Cheval Regiments; 6th & 8th Chasseurs à Cheval Regiments; 9th & 25th Chasseurs à Cheval Regiments	432
I Cavalry Corps; General of Division; Jean-Pierre Doumerc followed by: Étienne de Bordesoulle	2nd Heavy Cavalry Division; General of Division; Étienne de Bordesoulle	1,196	1st Brigade; General of Brigade; Nicolas Marin Thiry	2nd & 3rd Cuirassier Regiments; 6th & 9th Cuirassier Regiments; 11th & 12th Cuirassier Regiments	614
I Cavalry Corps; General of Division; Jean-Pierre Doumerc followed by: Étienne de Bordesoulle	2nd Heavy Cavalry Division; General of Division; Étienne de Bordesoulle	1,196	2nd Brigade; General of Brigade; Joseph Alexandre Félix de Laville	4th, 7th & 14th Cuirassier Regiments; 7th & 23rd Dragoon Regiments; 28th and 30th Dragoon Regiments	582
I Cavalry Corps; General of Division; Jean-Pierre Doumerc followed by: Étienne de Bordesoulle	Attached Artillery	170; 6 guns	Not Brigaded	1st Horse Artillery Regiment, 3rd Company	77, 6 guns
I Cavalry Corps; General of Division; Jean-Pierre Doumerc followed by: Étienne de Bordesoulle	Attached Artillery	170; 6 guns	Not Brigaded	1st (bis) Train Battalion, 2nd Company; 8th (bis) Train Battalion	93
II Cavalry Corps; General of Division; Antoine de Saint-Germain	2nd Light Cavalry Division; General of Division; Sigismond Frédéric de Berckheim	977	3rd Brigade; General of Brigade; Jean-Baptiste Dommanget	5th & 9th Hussar Regiments; 11th & 12th Chasseurs à Cheval Regiments; 2nd & 4th Chevau-léger Lancer Regiments	117
II Cavalry Corps; General of Division; Antoine de Saint-Germain	2nd Light Cavalry Division; General of Division; Sigismond Frédéric de Berckheim	977	4th Brigade; General of Brigade; Jean-Baptiste Jamin de Bermuy	6th Chevau-léger Lancer Regiment; 4th, 7th & 20th Chasseurs à Cheval Regiments; 23rd & 24th Chasseurs à Cheval Regiments	860
II Cavalry Corps; General of Division; Antoine de Saint-Germain	2nd Heavy Cavalry Division; General of Division; Antoine de Saint-Germain	665	3rd Brigade; General of Brigade; Amable Guy Blancard	1st Carabinier Regiment; 2nd Carabinier Regiments; 1st Cuirassier Regiment	390
II Cavalry Corps; General of Division; Antoine de Saint-Germain	2nd Heavy Cavalry Division; General of Division; Antoine de Saint-Germain	665	4th Brigade; General of Brigade; Louis Charles Sopransi	5th & 8th Cuirassier Regiments; 10th & 13th Cuirassier Regiments	275
II Cavalry Corps; General of Division; Antoine de Saint-Germain	Corps Artillery; Lieutenant Colonel Graillat	270; 4 guns	Not Brigaded	1st Horse Artillery, 1st Company; 5th Horse Artillery, 5th Company; 1st (bis) Train Battalion	270, 4 guns
Independent Cavalry	Cavalry Division; General of Division; Jean-Marie Defrance	896	General of Brigade; Cyrille-Simon Picquet	10th Hussar Regiment	-
Independent Cavalry	Cavalry Division; General of Division; Jean-Marie Defrance	896	General of Brigade; Cyrille-Simon Picquet	1st Gardes d'Honneur Regiment	-
Independent Cavalry	Cavalry Division; General of Division; Jean-Marie Defrance	896	General of Brigade; Philippe Paul, comte de Ségur	2nd Gardes d'Honneur Regiment	-
Independent Cavalry	Cavalry Division; General of Division; Jean-Marie Defrance	896	General of Brigade; Philippe Paul, comte de Ségur	3rd Gardes d'Honneur Regiment	-
Independent Cavalry	Cavalry Division; General of Division; Jean-Marie Defrance	896	General of Brigade; Philippe Paul, comte de Ségur	4th Gardes d'Honneur Regiment	-
VI Corps; Marshal; Auguste de Marmont	3rd Infantry Division; General of Division; Joseph Lagrange	4,868	General of Brigade; Joseph Antoine René Joubert	1st & 15th Line Infantry Regiments	-
VI Corps; Marshal; Auguste de Marmont	3rd Infantry Division; General of Division; Joseph Lagrange	4,868	General of Brigade; Joseph Antoine René Joubert	16th & 62nd Line Infantry Regiments	-
VI Corps; Marshal; Auguste de Marmont	3rd Infantry Division; General of Division; Joseph Lagrange	4,868	General of Brigade; Joseph Antoine René Joubert	70th & 121st Line Infantry Regiments	-
VI Corps; Marshal; Auguste de Marmont	3rd Infantry Division; General of Division; Joseph Lagrange	4,868	General of Brigade; Joseph Antoine René Joubert	I, II / 1st Marine Regiment	-
VI Corps; Marshal; Auguste de Marmont	3rd Infantry Division; General of Division; Joseph Lagrange	4,868	General of Brigade; Pierre Pelleport	I–IV / 2nd Marine Regiment	-
VI Corps; Marshal; Auguste de Marmont	3rd Infantry Division; General of Division; Joseph Lagrange	4,868	General of Brigade; Pierre Pelleport	I–III / 3rd Marine Regiment	-
VI Corps; Marshal; Auguste de Marmont	3rd Infantry Division; General of Division; Joseph Lagrange	4,868	General of Brigade; Pierre Pelleport	I–III / 4th Marine Regiment	-
VI Corps; Marshal; Auguste de Marmont	3rd Infantry Division; General of Division; Joseph Lagrange	4,868	General of Brigade; Pierre Pelleport	III / 23rd Line Infantry Regiment	-
VI Corps; Marshal; Auguste de Marmont	3rd Infantry Division; General of Division; Joseph Lagrange	4,868	General of Brigade; Pierre Pelleport	I, III / 37th Line Infantry Regiment	-
VI Corps; Marshal; Auguste de Marmont	8th Infantry Division; General of Division; Étienne Pierre Ricard	2,917	General of Brigade; Jean-Louis Fournier	2nd & 6th Light Infantry Regiments, 2nd Battalions	-
VI Corps; Marshal; Auguste de Marmont	8th Infantry Division; General of Division; Étienne Pierre Ricard	2,917	General of Brigade; Jean-Louis Fournier	VII / 4th Light Infantry Regiment	-
VI Corps; Marshal; Auguste de Marmont	8th Infantry Division; General of Division; Étienne Pierre Ricard	2,917	General of Brigade; Jean-Louis Fournier	9th & 16th Light Infantry Regiments	-
VI Corps; Marshal; Auguste de Marmont	8th Infantry Division; General of Division; Étienne Pierre Ricard	2,917	General of Brigade; Jean-Louis Fournier	II / 40th Line Infantry Regiment	-
VI Corps; Marshal; Auguste de Marmont	8th Infantry Division; General of Division; Étienne Pierre Ricard	2,917	General of Brigade; Jean-Louis Fournier	I / 50th Line Infantry Regiment	-
VI Corps; Marshal; Auguste de Marmont	8th Infantry Division; General of Division; Étienne Pierre Ricard	2,917	General of Brigade; François-Louis Boudin de Roville (WIA)	22nd & 69th Line Infantry Regiments	-
VI Corps; Marshal; Auguste de Marmont	8th Infantry Division; General of Division; Étienne Pierre Ricard	2,917	General of Brigade; François-Louis Boudin de Roville (WIA)	136th & 138th Line Infantry Regiments, 1st Battalions	-
VI Corps; Marshal; Auguste de Marmont	8th Infantry Division; General of Division; Étienne Pierre Ricard	2,917	General of Brigade; François-Louis Boudin de Roville (WIA)	I / 142nd Line Infantry Regiment	-
VI Corps; Marshal; Auguste de Marmont	8th Infantry Division; General of Division; Étienne Pierre Ricard	2,917	General of Brigade; François-Louis Boudin de Roville (WIA)	144th & 145th Line Infantry Regiments, 1st Battalions	-
VI Corps; Marshal; Auguste de Marmont	Corps Artillery	775; 30 guns	Not Brigaded	3rd Foot Artillery, 6th, 23rd & 25th Companies; 4th Foot Artillery, 2nd & 11th Companies; 5th Foot Artillery, 13th–16th & 27th Companies; 8 12-pound cannons 13 6-pound cannons & howitzers	266, 21 guns
VI Corps; Marshal; Auguste de Marmont	Corps Artillery	775; 30 guns	Not Brigaded	1st Horse Artillery, 2nd Company; 3rd Horse Artillery, 7th Company; 5th Horse Artillery, 8th Company; 9 6-pound cannons & howitzers	156, 9 guns
VI Corps; Marshal; Auguste de Marmont	Corps Artillery	775; 30 guns	Not Brigaded	3rd, 8th (bis), & 12th Train Battalions, 1 company each 4th Train Battalion, 1st & 4th Companies; 9th (bis) Train Battalion, 1st & 5th Companies	353
VII Corps; Marshal Nicolas Oudinot not present	7th Division; General of Division; Jean François Leval	4,500	General of Brigade; Pierre Armand Pinoteau	I, II / 10th Light Infantry Regiment	-
VII Corps; Marshal Nicolas Oudinot not present	7th Division; General of Division; Jean François Leval	4,500	General of Brigade; Pierre Armand Pinoteau	I / 3rd Line Infantry Regiment	-
VII Corps; Marshal Nicolas Oudinot not present	7th Division; General of Division; Jean François Leval	4,500	General of Brigade; Pierre Armand Pinoteau	I / 5th Line Infantry Regiment	-
VII Corps; Marshal Nicolas Oudinot not present	7th Division; General of Division; Jean François Leval	4,500	General of Brigade; Pierre Armand Pinoteau	I, IV / 130th Line Infantry Regiment	-
VII Corps; Marshal Nicolas Oudinot not present	7th Division; General of Division; Jean François Leval	4,500	General of Brigade; Jacques Montfort	I / 17th Light Infantry Regiment	-
VII Corps; Marshal Nicolas Oudinot not present	7th Division; General of Division; Jean François Leval	4,500	General of Brigade; Jacques Montfort	I / 101st Line Infantry Regiment	-
VII Corps; Marshal Nicolas Oudinot not present	7th Division; General of Division; Jean François Leval	4,500	General of Brigade; Jacques Montfort	I, II / 105th Line Infantry Regiment	-
VII Corps; Marshal Nicolas Oudinot not present	7th Division; General of Division; Jean François Leval	4,500	Divisional Artillery	2 Foot Artillery Companies	-
VII Corps; Marshal Nicolas Oudinot not present	7th Division; General of Division; Jean François Leval	4,500	Divisional Artillery	1 Horse Artillery Company	-

== Battle of Montmirail ==
On 11 February, Napoleon marched west through Montmirail with 10,500 men, consisting of the Old Guard, Étienne Pierre Sylvestre Ricard's division, and 36 guns. The French faced Fabian Wilhelm von Osten-Sacken's 18,000 Russians (with 80 or 90 guns) (Note: If Sacken had 12 guns for each of his 11 batteries, he would have had 132 guns available at Montmirail, instead of the 80–90 guns given by the sources.) and Ludwig Yorck von Wartenburg's 18,000 Prussians. Sacken tried to force his way to the west, but Yorck's troops were delayed. By 4:00 pm, Napoleon's strength rose to 20,000. The French defeated Sacken's corps while Marshal Édouard Mortier repelled Yorck's belated attack. Sacken lost 2,000 killed and wounded plus 800 men, 13 guns, and six colors captured. The Prussians sustained 900 casualties while the French lost 2,000. French Generals Claude-Étienne Michel and François-Louis Boudin de Roville and Prussian General Otto Karl Lorenz von Pirch were wounded.

=== Sacken's Russian order of battle ===
General-Leutnant Fabian Wilhelm von Osten-Sacken

Sacken's Army Corps at Montmirail and Château-Thierry
Corps	Division	Brigade	Regiment
Reserve Artillery	General-major Alexey Petrovich Nikitin	Not Brigaded	Position Battery Nr. 10
Reserve Artillery	General-major Alexey Petrovich Nikitin	Not Brigaded	Position Battery Nr. 13
Reserve Artillery	General-major Alexey Petrovich Nikitin	Not Brigaded	Position Battery Nr. 18
Reserve Artillery	General-major Alexey Petrovich Nikitin	Not Brigaded	Light Battery Nr. 28
VI Infantry Corps; General-Leutnant; Alexei Grigorievich Scherbatov (sick); General-major; Alexander Ivanovich Tallisin II	7th Division; General-major; Nikolay Gregoryevich Scherbatov II	Colonel Kritschinikov	Moscow Infantry Regiment, 1 battalion
VI Infantry Corps; General-Leutnant; Alexei Grigorievich Scherbatov (sick); General-major; Alexander Ivanovich Tallisin II	7th Division; General-major; Nikolay Gregoryevich Scherbatov II	Colonel Kritschinikov	Pskov Infantry Regiment, 1 battalion
VI Infantry Corps; General-Leutnant; Alexei Grigorievich Scherbatov (sick); General-major; Alexander Ivanovich Tallisin II	7th Division; General-major; Nikolay Gregoryevich Scherbatov II	Colonel Augustov	Libau Infantry Regiment, 1 battalion
VI Infantry Corps; General-Leutnant; Alexei Grigorievich Scherbatov (sick); General-major; Alexander Ivanovich Tallisin II	7th Division; General-major; Nikolay Gregoryevich Scherbatov II	Colonel Augustov	Sophia Infantry Regiment, 1 battalion
VI Infantry Corps; General-Leutnant; Alexei Grigorievich Scherbatov (sick); General-major; Alexander Ivanovich Tallisin II	7th Division; General-major; Nikolay Gregoryevich Scherbatov II	Colonel Dietrich	11th Jäger Regiment, 1 battalion
VI Infantry Corps; General-Leutnant; Alexei Grigorievich Scherbatov (sick); General-major; Alexander Ivanovich Tallisin II	7th Division; General-major; Nikolay Gregoryevich Scherbatov II	Colonel Dietrich	36th Jäger Regiment, 1 battalion
VI Infantry Corps; General-Leutnant; Alexei Grigorievich Scherbatov (sick); General-major; Alexander Ivanovich Tallisin II	18th Division; General-major; Bernodessov	Lieutenant Colonel Blagovenzenko	Dnieper Infantry Regiment, 1 battalion
VI Infantry Corps; General-Leutnant; Alexei Grigorievich Scherbatov (sick); General-major; Alexander Ivanovich Tallisin II	18th Division; General-major; Bernodessov	Lieutenant Colonel Blagovenzenko	Vladimir Infantry Regiment, 1 battalion
VI Infantry Corps; General-Leutnant; Alexei Grigorievich Scherbatov (sick); General-major; Alexander Ivanovich Tallisin II	18th Division; General-major; Bernodessov	General-major Heidenreich (POW)	Kostroma Infantry Regiment, 1 battalion
VI Infantry Corps; General-Leutnant; Alexei Grigorievich Scherbatov (sick); General-major; Alexander Ivanovich Tallisin II	18th Division; General-major; Bernodessov	General-major Heidenreich (POW)	Tambov Infantry Regiment, 1 battalion
VI Infantry Corps; General-Leutnant; Alexei Grigorievich Scherbatov (sick); General-major; Alexander Ivanovich Tallisin II	18th Division; General-major; Bernodessov	General-major Metcherinov	28th Jäger Regiment, 1 battalion
VI Infantry Corps; General-Leutnant; Alexei Grigorievich Scherbatov (sick); General-major; Alexander Ivanovich Tallisin II	18th Division; General-major; Bernodessov	General-major Metcherinov	32nd Jäger Regiment, 1 battalion
VI Infantry Corps; General-Leutnant; Alexei Grigorievich Scherbatov (sick); General-major; Alexander Ivanovich Tallisin II	VI Corps Artillery	Not Brigaded	Light Battery Nr. 19
VI Infantry Corps; General-Leutnant; Alexei Grigorievich Scherbatov (sick); General-major; Alexander Ivanovich Tallisin II	VI Corps Artillery	Not Brigaded	Light Battery Nr. 24
XI Infantry Corps; General-major; Ivan Andreievich Lieven III	10th Division; General-major; Andrey Andreevich Zass I	General-major; Josif Karlovich Sokolovsky	Yaroslavl Infantry Regiment, 1 battalion
XI Infantry Corps; General-major; Ivan Andreievich Lieven III	10th Division; General-major; Andrey Andreevich Zass I	General-major; Josif Karlovich Sokolovsky	Kursk Infantry Regiment, 1 battalion
XI Infantry Corps; General-major; Ivan Andreievich Lieven III	10th Division; General-major; Andrey Andreevich Zass I	General-major; Josif Karlovich Sokolovsky	Bieloserk Infantry Regiment, 2 battalions
XI Infantry Corps; General-major; Ivan Andreievich Lieven III	10th Division; General-major; Andrey Andreevich Zass I	Colonel Achlestischev	8th Jäger Regiment, 1 battalion
XI Infantry Corps; General-major; Ivan Andreievich Lieven III	10th Division; General-major; Andrey Andreevich Zass I	Colonel Achlestischev	39th Jäger Regiment, 1 battalion
XI Infantry Corps; General-major; Ivan Andreievich Lieven III	10th Division; General-major; Andrey Andreevich Zass I	Lieutenant Colonel Selivanov; Attached from 16th Division	Kamchatka Infantry Regiment, 1 battalion
XI Infantry Corps; General-major; Ivan Andreievich Lieven III	10th Division; General-major; Andrey Andreevich Zass I	Lieutenant Colonel Selivanov; Attached from 16th Division	Okhotsk Infantry Regiment, 1 battalion
XI Infantry Corps; General-major; Ivan Andreievich Lieven III	27th Division; General-Leutnant; Maxim Fyodorovich Stavitsky	Colonel Lewandowsky	Odessa Infantry Regiment, 1 battalion
XI Infantry Corps; General-major; Ivan Andreievich Lieven III	27th Division; General-Leutnant; Maxim Fyodorovich Stavitsky	Colonel Lewandowsky	Vilna Infantry Regiment, 1 battalion
XI Infantry Corps; General-major; Ivan Andreievich Lieven III	27th Division; General-Leutnant; Maxim Fyodorovich Stavitsky	Colonel Alexejev	Simbirsk Infantry Regiment, 1 battalion
XI Infantry Corps; General-major; Ivan Andreievich Lieven III	27th Division; General-Leutnant; Maxim Fyodorovich Stavitsky	Colonel Alexejev	Tarnopol Infantry Regiment, 1 battalion
XI Infantry Corps; General-major; Ivan Andreievich Lieven III	27th Division; General-Leutnant; Maxim Fyodorovich Stavitsky	Colonel Kalogruivoff	49th Jäger Regiment, 1 battalion
XI Infantry Corps; General-major; Ivan Andreievich Lieven III	27th Division; General-Leutnant; Maxim Fyodorovich Stavitsky	Colonel Kalogruivoff	50th Jäger Regiment, 1 battalion
XI Infantry Corps; General-major; Ivan Andreievich Lieven III	XI Corps Artillery	Not Brigaded	Light Battery Nr. 34
XI Infantry Corps; General-major; Ivan Andreievich Lieven III	XI Corps Artillery	Not Brigaded	Light Battery Nr. 35
Cavalry Corps; General-Leutnant; Ilarion Vasilievich Vasilshikov	2nd Hussar Division; General-major; Sergei Nicholaevich Lanskoi	General-major; Ivan Mikhailovich Vadbolsky	Akhtyrsk Hussar Regiment, 6 squadrons
Cavalry Corps; General-Leutnant; Ilarion Vasilievich Vasilshikov	2nd Hussar Division; General-major; Sergei Nicholaevich Lanskoi	General-major; Ivan Mikhailovich Vadbolsky	Marioupol Hussar Regiment, 5 squadrons
Cavalry Corps; General-Leutnant; Ilarion Vasilievich Vasilshikov	2nd Hussar Division; General-major; Sergei Nicholaevich Lanskoi	Colonel; Dmitri Vasilievich Vasilshikov II	White Russia Hussar Regiment, 4 squadrons
Cavalry Corps; General-Leutnant; Ilarion Vasilievich Vasilshikov	2nd Hussar Division; General-major; Sergei Nicholaevich Lanskoi	Colonel; Dmitri Vasilievich Vasilshikov II	Alexandria Hussar Regiment, 5 squadrons
Cavalry Corps; General-Leutnant; Ilarion Vasilievich Vasilshikov	3rd Dragoon Division; General-major; Semyon Davydovich Pandschulishev	General-major; Pavel Nicolaevich Ushakov II	Smolensk Dragoon Regiment
Cavalry Corps; General-Leutnant; Ilarion Vasilievich Vasilshikov	3rd Dragoon Division; General-major; Semyon Davydovich Pandschulishev	General-major; Pavel Nicolaevich Ushakov II	Kurland Dragoon Regiment
Cavalry Corps; General-Leutnant; Ilarion Vasilievich Vasilshikov	3rd Dragoon Division; General-major; Semyon Davydovich Pandschulishev	General-major; Andrey Semyonovich Umanets	Tver Dragoon Regiment
Cavalry Corps; General-Leutnant; Ilarion Vasilievich Vasilshikov	3rd Dragoon Division; General-major; Semyon Davydovich Pandschulishev	General-major; Andrey Semyonovich Umanets	Kinburn Dragoon Regiment
Cavalry Corps; General-Leutnant; Ilarion Vasilievich Vasilshikov	3rd Dragoon Division; General-major; Semyon Davydovich Pandschulishev	Not Brigaded	Horse Artillery Battery Nr. 18, 10 guns
Cavalry Corps; General-Leutnant; Ilarion Vasilievich Vasilshikov	Cossacks; General-major; Akim Akimovich Karpov II	Not Brigaded	Karpov II Don Cossack Regiment
Cavalry Corps; General-Leutnant; Ilarion Vasilievich Vasilshikov	Cossacks; General-major; Akim Akimovich Karpov II	Not Brigaded	Semintschikov IV Don Cossack Regiment
Cavalry Corps; General-Leutnant; Ilarion Vasilievich Vasilshikov	Cossacks; General-major; Akim Akimovich Karpov II	Not Brigaded	Lukovken II Don Cossack Regiment
Cavalry Corps; General-Leutnant; Ilarion Vasilievich Vasilshikov	Cossacks; General-major; Akim Akimovich Karpov II	Not Brigaded	Kuteinikov IV Don Cossack Regiment
Cavalry Corps; General-Leutnant; Ilarion Vasilievich Vasilshikov	Cossacks; General-major; Akim Akimovich Karpov II	Not Brigaded	Grekov I Don Cossack Regiment
Cavalry Corps; General-Leutnant; Ilarion Vasilievich Vasilshikov	Cossacks; General-major; Akim Akimovich Karpov II	Not Brigaded	St Petersburg Opolchenie Cossack Regiment
Cavalry Corps; General-Leutnant; Ilarion Vasilievich Vasilshikov	Cossacks; General-major; Akim Akimovich Karpov II	Not Brigaded	4th Ukrainian Cossack Regiment
Cavalry Corps; General-Leutnant; Ilarion Vasilievich Vasilshikov	Cossacks; General-major; Akim Akimovich Karpov II	Not Brigaded	2nd Kalmuck Regiment
Cavalry Corps; General-Leutnant; Ilarion Vasilievich Vasilshikov	Cavalry Corps Artillery	Not Brigaded	Horse Artillery Battery Nr. 6
Cavalry Corps; General-Leutnant; Ilarion Vasilievich Vasilshikov	Cavalry Corps Artillery	Not Brigaded	Horse Artillery Battery Nr. 7

=== Yorck's Prussian order of battle ===
The 1st Brigade under General-major Otto Karl Lorenz von Pirch and the 7th Brigade under General-major Heinrich Wilhelm von Horn were engaged. The only Prussian artillery present were the two batteries attached to the 1st and 7th Brigades. The remainder of the artillery was unable to get forward because of poor condition of the roads. The 8th Brigade was sent back to hold Château-Thierry in case of an attack by Marshal Jacques MacDonald.

Yorck's Corps at Montmirail and Château-Thierry
Corps	Brigade	Strength	Regiment
I Corps; General of the Infantry; Ludwig Yorck von Wartenburg	1st Brigade; General-major; Otto Karl Lorenz von Pirch	3,505	1st East Prussian Grenadier Battalion
I Corps; General of the Infantry; Ludwig Yorck von Wartenburg	1st Brigade; General-major; Otto Karl Lorenz von Pirch	3,505	Silesian Grenadier Battalion
I Corps; General of the Infantry; Ludwig Yorck von Wartenburg	1st Brigade; General-major; Otto Karl Lorenz von Pirch	3,505	Leib Grenadier Battalion
I Corps; General of the Infantry; Ludwig Yorck von Wartenburg	1st Brigade; General-major; Otto Karl Lorenz von Pirch	3,505	West Prussian Grenadier Battalion
I Corps; General of the Infantry; Ludwig Yorck von Wartenburg	1st Brigade; General-major; Otto Karl Lorenz von Pirch	339	Foot Jägers
I Corps; General of the Infantry; Ludwig Yorck von Wartenburg	1st Brigade; General-major; Otto Karl Lorenz von Pirch	4,826	13th Silesian Landwehr Regiment, 4 battalions
I Corps; General of the Infantry; Ludwig Yorck von Wartenburg	1st Brigade; General-major; Otto Karl Lorenz von Pirch	728	East Prussian National Cavalry Regiment, 4 squadrons (+148 Jägers)
I Corps; General of the Infantry; Ludwig Yorck von Wartenburg	1st Brigade; General-major; Otto Karl Lorenz von Pirch	96	6-pounder Foot Artillery Battery Nr. 2
I Corps; General of the Infantry; Ludwig Yorck von Wartenburg	2nd Brigade; Oberst; Friedrich Wilhelm von Warburg	4,777	1st East Prussian Regiment, 3 battalions
I Corps; General of the Infantry; Ludwig Yorck von Wartenburg	2nd Brigade; Oberst; Friedrich Wilhelm von Warburg	4,777	2nd East Prussian Regiment, 3 battalions
I Corps; General of the Infantry; Ludwig Yorck von Wartenburg	2nd Brigade; Oberst; Friedrich Wilhelm von Warburg	197	Foot Jägers
I Corps; General of the Infantry; Ludwig Yorck von Wartenburg	2nd Brigade; Oberst; Friedrich Wilhelm von Warburg	469	Mecklinburg-Strelitz Hussar Regiment, 4 squadrons (+46 Jägers)
I Corps; General of the Infantry; Ludwig Yorck von Wartenburg	2nd Brigade; Oberst; Friedrich Wilhelm von Warburg	94	6-pounder Foot Artillery Battery Nr. 1
I Corps; General of the Infantry; Ludwig Yorck von Wartenburg	7th Brigade; General-major; Heinrich Wilhelm von Horn	2,688	Leib Infantry Regiment, 3 battalions
I Corps; General of the Infantry; Ludwig Yorck von Wartenburg	7th Brigade; General-major; Heinrich Wilhelm von Horn	278	Foot Jägers
I Corps; General of the Infantry; Ludwig Yorck von Wartenburg	7th Brigade; General-major; Heinrich Wilhelm von Horn	4,589	5th Silesian Landwehr Regiment, 2 battalions
I Corps; General of the Infantry; Ludwig Yorck von Wartenburg	7th Brigade; General-major; Heinrich Wilhelm von Horn	4,589	15th Silesian Landwehr Regiment, 2 battalions
I Corps; General of the Infantry; Ludwig Yorck von Wartenburg	7th Brigade; General-major; Heinrich Wilhelm von Horn	492	Brandenburg Hussar Regiment (+200 Jägers)
I Corps; General of the Infantry; Ludwig Yorck von Wartenburg	7th Brigade; General-major; Heinrich Wilhelm von Horn	114	6-pounder Foot Artillery Battery Nr. 3
I Corps; General of the Infantry; Ludwig Yorck von Wartenburg	8th Brigade; General-major; Prince Wilhelm of Prussia	4,726	Brandenburg Infantry Regiment, 3 battalions
I Corps; General of the Infantry; Ludwig Yorck von Wartenburg	8th Brigade; General-major; Prince Wilhelm of Prussia	4,726	12th Reserve Infantry Regiment, 2 battalions
I Corps; General of the Infantry; Ludwig Yorck von Wartenburg	8th Brigade; General-major; Prince Wilhelm of Prussia	2,102	12th Silesian Landwehr Regiment, 2 battalions
I Corps; General of the Infantry; Ludwig Yorck von Wartenburg	8th Brigade; General-major; Prince Wilhelm of Prussia	382	2nd Leib Hussar Regiment (+84 Jägers)
I Corps; General of the Infantry; Ludwig Yorck von Wartenburg	8th Brigade; General-major; Prince Wilhelm of Prussia	97	6-pounder Foot Artillery Battery Nr. 15
I Corps; General of the Infantry; Ludwig Yorck von Wartenburg	Reserve Cavalry; Oberst; Georg Ludwig von Wahlen-Jürgass	2,031 Line; 318 Jägers	Henkel's Brigade: Lithuanian Dragoon Regiment
I Corps; General of the Infantry; Ludwig Yorck von Wartenburg	Reserve Cavalry; Oberst; Georg Ludwig von Wahlen-Jürgass	2,031 Line; 318 Jägers	Henkel's Brigade: 1st West Prussian Dragoon Regiment
I Corps; General of the Infantry; Ludwig Yorck von Wartenburg	Reserve Cavalry; Oberst; Georg Ludwig von Wahlen-Jürgass	2,031 Line; 318 Jägers	Katzler's Brigade: Brandenburg Uhlan Regiment
I Corps; General of the Infantry; Ludwig Yorck von Wartenburg	Reserve Cavalry; Oberst; Georg Ludwig von Wahlen-Jürgass	1,341	Katzler's Brigade: 1st Neumark Landwehr Cavalry Regiment
I Corps; General of the Infantry; Ludwig Yorck von Wartenburg	Reserve Cavalry; Oberst; Georg Ludwig von Wahlen-Jürgass	1,341	Bieberstein's Brigade: 5th Silesian Landwehr Cavalry Regiment
I Corps; General of the Infantry; Ludwig Yorck von Wartenburg	Reserve Cavalry; Oberst; Georg Ludwig von Wahlen-Jürgass	1,341	Bieberstein's Brigade: 10th Silesian Landwehr Cavalry Regiment
I Corps; General of the Infantry; Ludwig Yorck von Wartenburg	Reserve Cavalry; Oberst; Georg Ludwig von Wahlen-Jürgass	327	6-pounder Horse Artillery Battery Nr. 1
I Corps; General of the Infantry; Ludwig Yorck von Wartenburg	Reserve Cavalry; Oberst; Georg Ludwig von Wahlen-Jürgass	327	6-pounder Horse Artillery Battery Nr. 2
I Corps; General of the Infantry; Ludwig Yorck von Wartenburg	Reserve Artillery; Oberst von Schmidt	522	12-pounder Foot Artillery Battery Nr. 1
I Corps; General of the Infantry; Ludwig Yorck von Wartenburg	Reserve Artillery; Oberst von Schmidt	522	12-pounder Foot Artillery Battery Nr. 2
I Corps; General of the Infantry; Ludwig Yorck von Wartenburg	Reserve Artillery; Oberst von Schmidt	522	6-pounder Horse Artillery Battery Nr. 3
I Corps; General of the Infantry; Ludwig Yorck von Wartenburg	Reserve Artillery; Oberst von Schmidt	522	6-pounder Horse Artillery Battery Nr. 12
I Corps; General of the Infantry; Ludwig Yorck von Wartenburg	Reserve Artillery; Oberst von Schmidt	522	Park Column Nr. 15
I Corps; General of the Infantry; Ludwig Yorck von Wartenburg	Reserve Artillery; Oberst von Schmidt	133	Pioneers

=== French order of battle ===
At Montmirail, Napoleon had the 1st and 2nd Old Guard Divisions, the 1st and 2nd Young Guard Divisions, the 1st, 2nd, and 3rd Guard Cavalry Divisions, Defrance's Cavalry Division, and Ricard's division. Marshal Marmont took position at Étoges with Lagrange's division and the I Cavalry Corps with orders to observe Blücher. Charles Lefebvre-Desnouettes led either the 2nd Guard Cavalry Division or the 3rd Young Guard Division; it is unclear.

== Battle of Château-Thierry ==
After being beaten by Napoleon's army at Montmirail, the corps of Sacken and Yorck withdrew toward Château-Thierry. When the Allied rearguard tried to hold off the French pursuit, Marshal Ney scattered the cavalry protecting the Allied left flank. The Prussian infantry escaped across the Marne River, but the French trapped a Russian brigade on the right flank and forced it to surrender. For the loss of 600 killed and wounded, the French inflicted 1,250 casualties on the Prussians and 1,500 casualties on the Russians. The French captured nine guns and many wagons. The Allies retreated to Fismes while the French repaired the broken bridge. The next day, Marshal Mortier led the pursuit with the divisions of Christiani, Colbert, and Defrance. The French captured 300–400 stragglers while as many as 2,000 more were turned in by groups of French farmers, who were infuriated by Allied plundering during the previous week.

=== French order of battle ===
On the morning of the battle, Saint-Germain reinforced Napoleon with 2,400 horsemen belonging to the II Cavalry Corps. Marshal MacDonald had destroyed the Trilport bridge over the Marne, which was on the direct route from Meaux to Montmirail. Therefore, the marshal sent Saint-Germain on a detour through Coulommiers to reach the main army. As on the previous day, Marmont's 4,000 soldiers continued to watch Blücher.

== Battle of Vauchamps ==
Napoleon found that Blücher drove Marmont's force from Étoges and decided to move against the Prussian field marshal. The French emperor left Château-Thierry at 3:00 am on 14 February for a rendezvous with Marmont. That morning, Blücher advanced west to Vauchamps where he ran into stiff resistance. Blücher decided to retreat after seeing the French cavalry defeat the Allied cavalry and discovering that he was facing Napoleon in person. The 25,000 French enjoyed a numerical advantage over the 20,000 Allied soldiers. By the end of the day, the French inflicted 7,000 casualties on their enemies and captured 16 guns; French losses were only 600. The losses include the remnant of Olsufiev's corps which lost 600 men and all its remaining artillery.

=== Kaptzevich's Russian order of battle ===
Kaptzevich's Corps at Vauchamps
Corps	Division	Brigade	Regiment
X Infantry Corps; General-Leutnant; Peter Mikhailovich Kaptzevich	X Corps Artillery	Not Brigaded	Position Battery Nr. 39
X Infantry Corps; General-Leutnant; Peter Mikhailovich Kaptzevich	X Corps Artillery	Not Brigaded	Light Battery Nr. 3
X Infantry Corps; General-Leutnant; Peter Mikhailovich Kaptzevich	X Corps Artillery	Not Brigaded	Light Battery Nr. 56
X Infantry Corps; General-Leutnant; Peter Mikhailovich Kaptzevich	8th Infantry Division; General-major; Alexander Petrovich Urusov II	Colonel Schenschen	Archangel Infantry Regiment, 2 battalions
X Infantry Corps; General-Leutnant; Peter Mikhailovich Kaptzevich	8th Infantry Division; General-major; Alexander Petrovich Urusov II	Colonel Schenschen	Schusselburg Infantry Regiment, 2 battalions
X Infantry Corps; General-Leutnant; Peter Mikhailovich Kaptzevich	8th Infantry Division; General-major; Alexander Petrovich Urusov II	Colonel Schenschen	Old Ingremannland Infantry Regiment, 2 battalions
X Infantry Corps; General-Leutnant; Peter Mikhailovich Kaptzevich	8th Infantry Division; General-major; Alexander Petrovich Urusov II	Colonel Suthof	7th Jäger Regiment, 2 battalions
X Infantry Corps; General-Leutnant; Peter Mikhailovich Kaptzevich	8th Infantry Division; General-major; Alexander Petrovich Urusov II	Colonel Suthof	37th Jäger Regiment, 1 battalion
X Infantry Corps; General-Leutnant; Peter Mikhailovich Kaptzevich	22nd Infantry Division; General-major; Pavel Petrovich Turchaninov I	General-major Schapskoy	Olonetz Infantry Regiment, 1 battalion
X Infantry Corps; General-Leutnant; Peter Mikhailovich Kaptzevich	22nd Infantry Division; General-major; Pavel Petrovich Turchaninov I	General-major Schapskoy	Viatka Infantry Regiment, 2 battalions
X Infantry Corps; General-Leutnant; Peter Mikhailovich Kaptzevich	22nd Infantry Division; General-major; Pavel Petrovich Turchaninov I	General-major Schapskoy	Staroskol Infantry Regiment, 1 battalion
X Infantry Corps; General-Leutnant; Peter Mikhailovich Kaptzevich	22nd Infantry Division; General-major; Pavel Petrovich Turchaninov I	General-major Vassilshikov	29th Jäger Regiment, 1 battalion
X Infantry Corps; General-Leutnant; Peter Mikhailovich Kaptzevich	22nd Infantry Division; General-major; Pavel Petrovich Turchaninov I	General-major Vassilshikov	45th Jäger Regiment, 1 battalion
IX Infantry Corps; 1,500 reorganized survivors	General-major; Evstafi Evstafievich Udom II	Brigades unknown	Temporary battalion 1
IX Infantry Corps; 1,500 reorganized survivors	General-major; Evstafi Evstafievich Udom II	Brigades unknown	Temporary battalion 2
IX Infantry Corps; 1,500 reorganized survivors	General-major; Evstafi Evstafievich Udom II	Brigades unknown	Temporary battalion 3
IX Infantry Corps; 1,500 reorganized survivors	General-major; Evstafi Evstafievich Udom II	Brigades unknown	Light Batteries Nrs. 13 & 24

=== Kleist's Prussian order of battle ===
Kleist's Corps at Vauchamps
Corps	Brigade	Regiment	Strength
II Corps; General-major; Friedrich von Kleist	9th Brigade	no units present	-
II Corps; General-major; Friedrich von Kleist	10th Brigade; General-major; Georg Dubislav Ludwig von Pirch	2nd West Prussian Infantry Regiment, 3 battalions	-
II Corps; General-major; Friedrich von Kleist	10th Brigade; General-major; Georg Dubislav Ludwig von Pirch	7th Reserve Infantry Regiment, 3 battalions	-
II Corps; General-major; Friedrich von Kleist	10th Brigade; General-major; Georg Dubislav Ludwig von Pirch	8th Silesian Landwehr Cavalry Regiment, 4 squadrons	-
II Corps; General-major; Friedrich von Kleist	10th Brigade; General-major; Georg Dubislav Ludwig von Pirch	6-pounder Foot Artillery Battery Nr. 8	8 guns
II Corps; General-major; Friedrich von Kleist	11th Brigade; General-major; Hans Ernst Karl, Graf von Zieten	1st Silesian Infantry Regiment, 3 battalions	-
II Corps; General-major; Friedrich von Kleist	11th Brigade; General-major; Hans Ernst Karl, Graf von Zieten	10th Reserve Infantry Regiment, 3 battalions	-
II Corps; General-major; Friedrich von Kleist	11th Brigade; General-major; Hans Ernst Karl, Graf von Zieten	Silesian Schützen Battalion, 2 companies	-
II Corps; General-major; Friedrich von Kleist	11th Brigade; General-major; Hans Ernst Karl, Graf von Zieten	1st Silesian Hussar Regiment, 4 squadrons	-
II Corps; General-major; Friedrich von Kleist	11th Brigade; General-major; Hans Ernst Karl, Graf von Zieten	6-pounder Foot Artillery Battery Nr. 9	8 guns
II Corps; General-major; Friedrich von Kleist	12th Brigade; General-major; Prince Augustus of Prussia	2nd Silesian Infantry Regiment, 3 battalions	-
II Corps; General-major; Friedrich von Kleist	12th Brigade; General-major; Prince Augustus of Prussia	11th Reserve Infantry Regiment, 2 battalions	-
II Corps; General-major; Friedrich von Kleist	12th Brigade; General-major; Prince Augustus of Prussia	7th Silesian Landwehr Cavalry Regiment, 4 squadrons	-
II Corps; General-major; Friedrich von Kleist	12th Brigade; General-major; Prince Augustus of Prussia	6-pounder Foot Artillery Battery Nr. 21	8 guns
II Corps; General-major; Friedrich von Kleist	Cavalry Brigade; Oberst; Karl Georg Albrecht Ernst von Hake	Silesian Cuirassier Regiment, 4 squadrons	-
II Corps; General-major; Friedrich von Kleist	Cavalry Brigade; Oberst; Karl Georg Albrecht Ernst von Hake	Silesian Uhlan Regiment, 4 squadrons	-
II Corps; General-major; Friedrich von Kleist	Cavalry Brigade; Oberst; Karl Georg Albrecht Ernst von Hake	6-pounder Horse Artillery Battery Nr. 8	8 guns
II Corps; General-major; Friedrich von Kleist	Cavalry Brigade; General-major; Friedrich Erhard von Röder	East Prussian Cuirassier Regiment, 4 squadrons	-
II Corps; General-major; Friedrich von Kleist	Cavalry Brigade; General-major; Friedrich Erhard von Röder	Brandenburg Cuirassier Regiment, 4 squadrons	-
II Corps; General-major; Friedrich von Kleist	II Corps Artillery; Oberst Johann Carl Ludwig Braun	12-pounder Foot Artillery Battery Nr. 3	8 guns
II Corps; General-major; Friedrich von Kleist	II Corps Artillery; Oberst Johann Carl Ludwig Braun	12-pounder Foot Artillery Battery Nr. 6	8 guns
II Corps; General-major; Friedrich von Kleist	II Corps Artillery; Oberst Johann Carl Ludwig Braun	6-pounder Foot Artillery Battery Nr. 11	8 guns
II Corps; General-major; Friedrich von Kleist	II Corps Artillery; Oberst Johann Carl Ludwig Braun	6-pounder Foot Artillery Battery Nr. 13	8 guns
II Corps; General-major; Friedrich von Kleist	II Corps Artillery; Oberst Johann Carl Ludwig Braun	6-pounder Horse Artillery Battery Nr. 9	8 guns
II Corps; General-major; Friedrich von Kleist	II Corps Artillery; Oberst Johann Carl Ludwig Braun	6-pounder Horse Artillery Battery Nr. 10	8 guns
II Corps; General-major; Friedrich von Kleist	II Corps Artillery; Oberst Johann Carl Ludwig Braun	Howitzer Battery Nr. 1	-

=== French order of battle ===
Hearing about Blücher's advance to Champaubert, Napoleon ordered Ricard's division to rejoin the VI Corps. He reorganized Marshal MacDonald's infantry into the XI Corps and sent it south to face Schwarzenberg's Allied army. Napoleon directed the following troops eastward to face Blücher: Friant's 1st Old Guard Division, Ney's two Young Guard divisions, Nansouty's 2nd and 3rd Guard Cavalry Divisions, and Saint-Germain's II Cavalry Corps. Jean Francois Leval's infantry division was marching north from Sézanne. The fighting ended before Leval's soldiers arrived on the field.

== Notes ==
Footnotes

Citations
