= Louis-Chrétien Carrière, Baron de Beaumont =

Louis Chrétien Carrière Baron de Beaumont
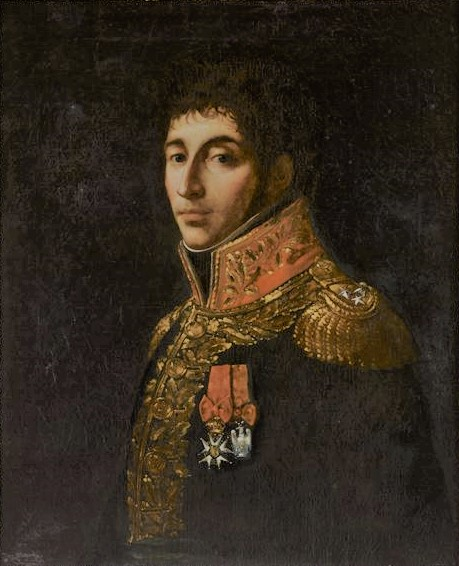
- Born: 24 April 1771; Malplacey, near Brouchy, France
- Died: 16 December 1813 (aged 42) Metz, France
- Allegiance: France
- Branch: Cavalry
- Service years: 1788–1813
- Rank: General of Division
- Conflicts: French Revolutionary Wars; Napoleonic Wars
- Awards: Légion d'Honneur, 1807; Order of the Iron Crown, 1807

Louis-Chrétien Carrière, baron de Beaumont (French pronunciation: [lwi kʁetjɛ̃ kaʁjɛʁ]; 24 April 1771 – 16 December 1813) was a French cavalry general during the Revolutionary and Napoleonic Wars.

== Early career ==
Born in Malplacey, near Brouchy, on 24 April 1771, Carrière joined the Queen's Dragoons (later renamed the 6th Dragoons) as a trooper on 1 April 1788. In 1792 he began service in the Army of the North, and due to his actions during the attack on the Austrian camp at Maulde, he was promoted to Second lieutenant in the 6th Hussars on 23 November 1792 and full Lieutenant on 20 April the following year.

On 23 September 1793 Carrière was appointed aide-de-camp to General Thomas-Alexandre Dumas (also a former trooper in the 6th Dragoons) and served with him in the Army of the West putting down the revolt in the Vendée until 1796. He was appointed deputy to the General Staff of the Army of Italy on 22 September 1796, and made a captain on 5 October the same year. Acting once more as Dumas' aide-de-camp, he took part in the French invasion of Egypt, following him to the province of Giza and helping to chase out the Arabs. His conduct at the battle of Abukir led to a provisional promotion to Chef d'escadron and an appointment as aide-de-camp to General Joachim Murat on 14 August 1799. This promotion was confirmed on his return to France on 21 April 1800. Beamont followed Murat into the Reserve Army, and fought at the Battle of Marengo on 14 June 1800.

== Colonel and general ==
Carrière was promoted to Chef de brigade on 17 April 1801, and became Colonel of the 10th Hussars on 1 February 1805. He led this regiment in V Corps of the Grande Armée under the command of Marshal Jean Lannes, fighting at Wertingen, Ulm, Amstetten and Austerlitz. During a cavalry charge at Wertingen, his horse carried him into the midst of a regiment of Austrian cuirassiers. He captured a captain of that corps, and killed several horsemen who tried to free their leader.

Promoted to Général de brigade on 24 December 1805, Carrière was made first aide-de-camp to Marshal Murat, and tasked with taking possession of Wesel on 9 March 1806. He served in Prussia and Poland in 1806/7, fighting at Jena on 14 October 1806. On 16 October, he took provisional command of a light cavalry brigade in place of General Milhaud, serving at Prenzlau on 28 October before returning to his role on Murat's staff. He fought at Eylau, and in front of Danzig on 14 May 1807, where he commanded the light cavalry of I Corps in place of General La Houssaye. Ordered to stop a force of 10,000 men marching from Pillau, he attacked and destroyed this body, taking their artillery and a large number of prisoners. On the same day he was made a Commander of the Légion d'Honneur and a Knight of the Order of the Iron Crown. He commanded the I Corps reserve cavalry at Friedland and contributed to the success of the day.

Sent to the war in Spain, on 7 September 1808 Carrière was given command of four regiments of light cavalry attached to Marshal Victor's I Corps of the Army of Spain. On 18 September his force was detached to form part of Marshal Bessières' II Corps. On 26 October 1808 he was proclaimed Baron de Beaumont. Returning to Victor's corps on 15 December, he fought at Uclés and at Medellín, where his brigade broke the enemy right and captured 6000 men. He was wounded at Talavera, took 4,000 prisoners at Ocaña, and took part in the Siege of Cádiz.

Recalled to the Grande Armée for the invasion of Russia, Beaumont commanded a brigade within Watier's 2nd Cuirassier Division of Montbrun's II Cavalry Corps. He fought at Smolensk, at Borodino and at two smaller actions around Moscow in October 1812. He was given command of a brigade of dismounted cavalry on 18 October, and made Général de division on 4 December 1812.

Back in Germany after the retreat from Moscow, Beaumont led the light cavalry in Ney's III Corps from 22 March 1813. At the battle of Lützen he led a brigade of lancers in VI Corps under Marmont, then the German light cavalry of XII Corps under Oudinot in August 1813. Briefly attached to IV Corps, he fought at Wartenburg on 3 October. Once more under Marmont's command, he fought at Leipzig and Hanau.

Beaumont died at Metz on 16 December 1813 (aged 42) of wounds received in Hanau. The name of his widow, D. Maria Urbana de Lima Barretto, appears in a table of pensions from the royal treasury dated 1 September 1817. Her letters to Soult, Chateaubriand, Charles X of France and John VI of Portugal still survive.

The name "Beaumont" appears engraved on Column 17 of the Arc de Triomphe, but it probably refers to Marc Antoine de Beaumont, also a Général de division and brother-in-law to Marshal Davout.
