= Franquemont =

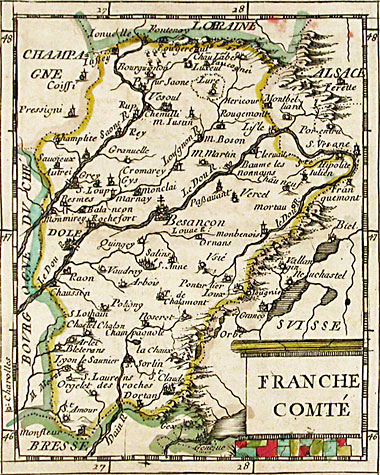
1662 Map of Franche-Comté by Pierre Duval

Franquemont is an ancient lordship on the banks of the river Doubs dominated by the castle of Franquemont. It comprised the river banks from le Theusseret to Le Moulin du Plain, the valley, hamlets, mills and villages of Gourgouton, Montbaron, Vautenaivre, Beaujour and Goumois.

In 1247, Thierry III, Count of Montbéliard, acquired the village of Goumois and several other properties on the river banks. In 1304 his successors passed it, along with its dependencies to Gauthier of Montfaucon, first Lord of Franquemont. Gauthier erected a castle on the remains of an ancient Roman fortress, on the edge which separates the hamlet of Belfond and the river Doubs. After his death, the Lordship and castle remained once again in the hands of the Counts of Montbéliard. During its complicated history, full of rivalries and wars such as the Burgundian Wars (1474-1477) and the Thirty Years' War (1618-1648), the lordship and its castle changed hands several times.

In 1538, the lordship of Franquemont was elevated to a barony by Emperor Charles V for Nicolas de Gilley. The sovereignty was continuously disputed between the Prince-Bishops of Basel, the Dukes of Württemberg, and the Counts of Montbeliard. These rivalries eventually led to the destruction of the castle in 1677 by the Prince-Bishop of Basel.

By the Treaty of Versailles on 11 July 1780, signed between Louis XVI, King of France and Frederic of Wangen, Prince-Bishop of Basel, the latter yielded the sovereignty over the left river bank of the Doubs to France. It was agreed that the Doubs would serve as a border between the two countries. The French Revolution, which brought an end to feudal rights, finally abolished the lordship of Franquemont and in 1793 the principality of the bishops of Basel was dissolved.

After the Congress of Vienna in 1815, the Swiss part of the ancient Barony formed the community of Goumois, Jura in Switzerland, the French part formed the community of Goumois, Doubs in France.

== The Castle of Franquemont ==
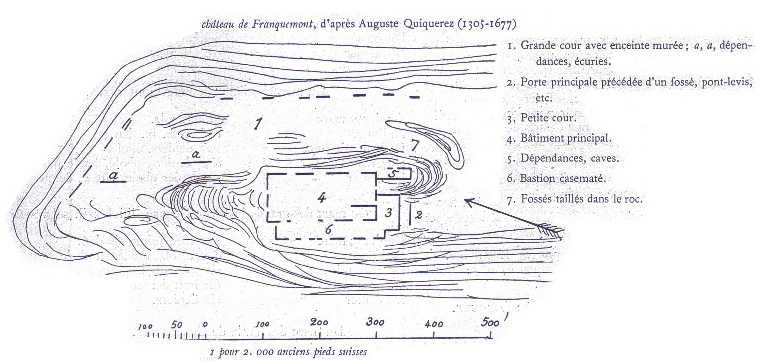
Château Franquemont 1850 by A. Quiquierez

Description of the Castle 1305-1677 (According to Auguste Quiquerez 1801–1882) :

Working the irregularities of the ground, the castle was built on two superposed terraces. The entry was situated on the south flank and lead to a large square, surrounded by walls thus delimiting a courtyard flanked by the dependences and a dungeon. The principal body of the structure dominated the fosse and gave access to a smaller courtyard. From there, traces of a wall indicate what must have been a rectangular building (approximately 60 x 30m). The latter was flanked on the west side by oval casemate structures, double walling of which A. Quiquerez provided a drawing dating from the 1850s. Most probably a chapel was constructed to the centre part of the building elevated above the fosse. Furthermore, it had a well or cistern in the northern part.

The last known inhabitant before the castle of Franquemont was destroyed in 1677 was Count Claude de Franquemont.

== House of Franquemont ==
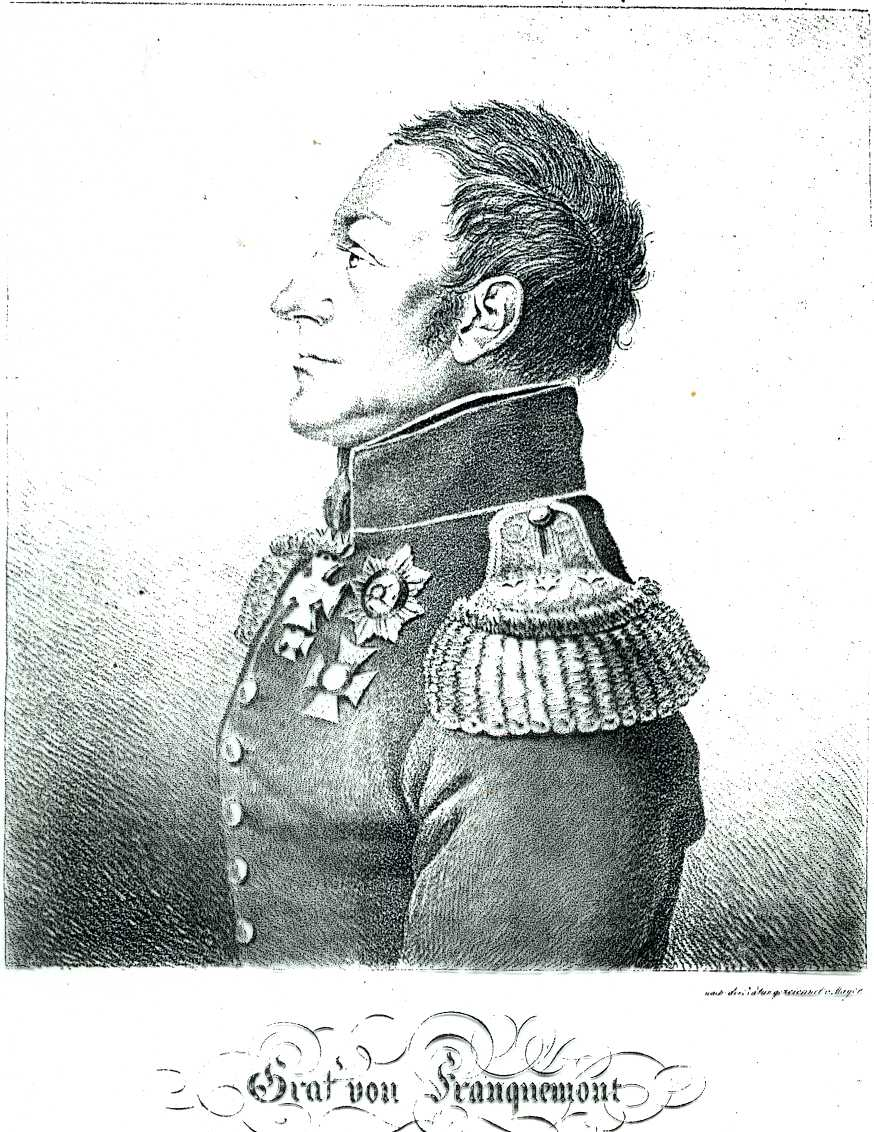
Count Frederic von Franquemont (1770-1842)

Several branches have existed of the Franquemont family all of which have roots in the Montbéliard and Württemberg families. Few remain as most branches no longer exist due to the lack of male heirs. Only the Württemberg branch still exists.

The branch of Franquemont in Franche-Comté originates from the Counts of Montbéliard, founded in the House of Württemberg by Etienne de Montfaucon count of Montbéliard (1325-1397). After his death, his natural son Henri inherits Franquemont. Among the earliest genealogical records is Henri's son Jean de Franquemont, Bailiff of Montbeliard (1489). This branch continued for more than ten generations as lords of Tremoing and Pierrefitte. In the 16th century the Franquemont's provide five Knights of the Order of St. George. In 1720 this branch of Franquemont was given the title of count. The land of Han-en-Barrois located in Barrois-Mouvant, was erected to County by Leopold Duke of Lorraine in favour of George-Gabriel de Montbéliard Count of Franquemont, his Chamberlain. The denomination Franquemont-en-Barrois originated from the fief of Franquemont on the Doubs in the County of Montbéliard, first appanage of his ancestors. Several alliances exist with the de Châtelet, d'Arbonnay, de Brunecoff, de Maillet, d’Aspremont, de Gilley, etc.

The line of Franquemont in Franche-Comté is related to the line of Franquemont in Württemberg by Henriette d'Orbe-Montfaucon countess of Montbéliard (1387-1444), granddaughter of Etienne de Montfaucon.

The Franquemonts in Württemberg descend from Carl Eugen, 12th Duke of Württemberg (1728–1793). He gave the name Franquemont to five of his natural sons. All five were officers in the Württemberg Army (Cape Regiment) which brought them to the Dutch East Indies with the Dutch East India Company (VOC). The eldest, Frederic William von Franquemont (1744-1790) was the colonel in command of the second battalion of the Cape Regiment. Another of them was the well known General Count Frederic von Franquemont (1770–1842) who, after his return from the Indies became a highly decorated army General, leading the Württemberger division in the Battle of Nations (1813). Count Frederic and his brother Colonel Carl von Franquemont were the only two of their generation to return to Württemberg after a captivity by the British in Ceylon. Descendants of their brothers returned to Europe only several generations later when the East Indies were no longer a colony of the Netherlands and became the Republic of Indonesia.

== Sources ==
- J. Beuret-Frantz, «Le vallon de Goumois et la seigneurie de Franquemont», in Actes SJE, 1913, 233-292 click link
- Arnold Robert, «La Seigneurie de Franquemont», Londres Spink & Son 17&18 Picadilly, 1904
- Arnold Robert, «La Seigneurie de Franquemont 2eme Partie», Londres Spink & Son 17&18 Picadilly, 1905
- Dictionnaire Genealogique, Heraldique, Chronologique et Historique, par M.D.L.C.D.B., Tome II, a Paris, M. DCC. LVII, p. 143-144, p. 160
- Dictionnaire de la Noblesse, par M. De La Chenaye-Desbois, Tome VI, Seconde edition, Paris, M.DCC. LXXIII., p. 659-660
- Mémoires Pour Servir à l’Histoire du Comté de Bourgogne, par M. F.I. Dunod de Charnage, à Besançon M.DCC.XL., p. 259-260
- Deutschen Adels Lexicon Band III 1975 Dor-F
- Neues allgemeines Deutsches Adels-Lexicon, Dritter Band, 1861
- Ordre de Saint Georges: click link
