= Battle of Wartenburg =

1813 battle during the War of the Sixth Coalition

- Part of the German campaign of the Sixth Coalition
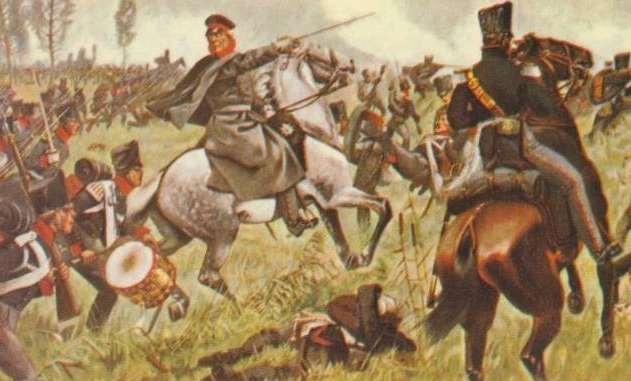
- Yorck at Wartenburg
Date	3 October 1813
Location	Wartenburg (Kemberg) 51°48′41″N 12°46′53″E
Result	Prussian victory

Belligerents
(Kingdom of Prussia) Prussia	(First French Empire) France: Italy; Württemberg

Commanders and leaders
(Kingdom of Prussia) Gebhard von Blücher (Kingdom of Prussia) Ludwig von Yorck	(First French Empire) Henri Gatien Bertrand

Strength
16,000 men, (Note: York's total force: up to 25,000) 64 guns	13,000–15,000 men, 24 guns

Casualties and losses
2,100 men	1,900–2,000 men, 13 guns
- Location within Europe

War of the Sixth Coalition:
German campaign
current battle
Napoleon in command
Napoleon not in command

The Battle of Wartenburg (German: Schlacht bei Wartenburg) took place on 3 October 1813 between the French IV Corps commanded by General Henri Gatien Bertrand and the Allied Army of Silesia, principally the I Corps of General Ludwig von Yorck with the personal participation of the army commander, Gebhard L. von Blücher. The battle allowed the Army of Silesia to cross the Elbe, ultimately leading to the Battle of Leipzig.

== Prelude ==
Map showing Blücher's move to the West prior to the battle of Wartenburg

Following his defeat at the battle of Dennewitz, Marshal Ney withdrew his army to defensive positions along the Elbe. The allied Army of the North, under the command of Crown Prince Charles John of Sweden (formerly French Marshal Bernadotte), followed them cautiously but made no serious effort to cross the river. To the east, Marshal Blücher made a bold march skirting Napoleon's position in Dresden to join his Army of Silesia with the Army of the North, cross the Elbe, and threaten Napoleon's communications with France.

Major von Rühle was tasked with finding a crossing point where the bridgehead could, if necessary, be defended by an army of 50,000 men against an enemy three times their size. The position he chose was at Elster, where the river makes a wide curve around Wartenburg on the opposite bank, and the flanks of a defending army could easily be supported by artillery on the right bank.

Blücher's army arrived in Elster on 2 October, replacing a force under Bülow which withdrew to rejoin the Army of the North. That evening he established two pontoon bridges across the Elbe and began to feed across the first elements of Yorck's I Corps. They found the ground unexpectedly marshy and cut with backwaters, which made it very difficult to deploy upon. Ahead of them a long dike separated them from the village of Wartenburg and the dry land beyond. The dike was a perfect breastwork behind which the French could deploy their infantry, and the lack of cover made it an ideal killing ground.

If the Prussians had underestimated the difficulty of the ground, the French commander General Bertrand made the opposite mistake. Having surveyed the area earlier in the year when water levels were higher, he believed his position to be impregnable.

== Battle ==
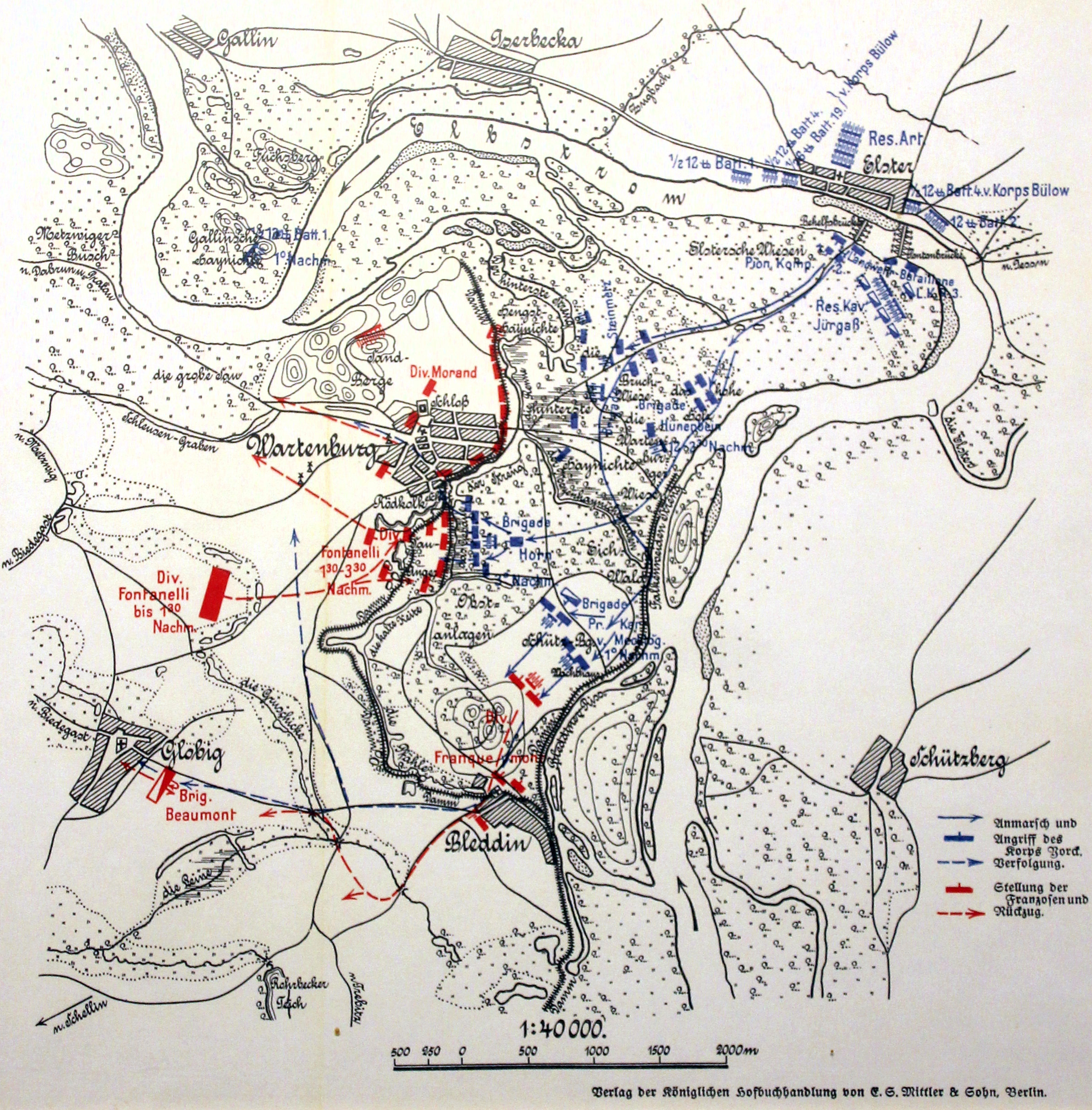
A map of the battle, labelled in German.

Bertrand deployed his forces as follows: Morand's French division was in Wartenburg, lined up along the dike. Franquemont's Württemberg division, severely mauled at Dennewitz and reduced to just four battalions and six guns, held Bleddin on the right flank. Fontanelli's Italian division and a small cavalry force under Beaumont were held behind in reserve.

The battle opened with a direct attack on Wartenburg by Steinmetz's brigade. This advance was met with a murderous fire from the defenders, sending the remains of the brigade falling back to the bridges in confusion. Here, Blücher rallied them and sent them forward once more, but they were unable to progress beyond the dike. Blücher also sent Mecklenburg's brigade to follow the bank of the Elbe upstream and work their way around Bertrand's right flank, by 11 a.m. They ran into Franquemont's division in front of Bleddin where a furious fight ensued.

By 2 p.m. the Württembergers had been dislodged from Bleddin, and Beaumont's cavalry swept aside by the Prussian Hussars. Wartenburg was now threatened from the east by Steinmetz and from the south by Mecklenburg. The decisive blow came from Horn's brigade. Passing through an orchard, and crossing a stream and two dikes, they fell upon Fontanelli's men, who had been called forward to reinforce Morand.

With his flank turned, Bertrand was forced to withdraw. IV Corps retreated first to Kemberg, and then to Düben where they established contact with Reynier's VII Corps. French losses were 900 killed and wounded, with 1,000 men, 13 guns and 80 ammunition wagons captured. The Prussians lost 1,900 killed and wounded, with 200 missing.

According to F. N. Maude, the "extraordinary tenacity of purpose" shown by the Prussian troops in this battle showed "how infinitely more important is the spirit with which men fight than the forms in which they have been trained, or the strategic relations of their fronts to one another."

== Aftermath ==
With the Army of Silesia established on the left bank of the Elbe, the Army of the North followed suit, crossing at Rosslau on 4 October. Thus began a sequence of strategic manoeuvres that would culminate in the Battle of Leipzig two weeks later.

General Yorck was subsequently raised to the nobility with the title Graf von Wartenburg.

== Order of battle ==
=== Allied Forces ===
- IV Corps of the Grande Armée, commanded by Général de Division Henri Gratien Bertrand
  - 29th Light Cavalry Brigade (Germans), commanded by Général de Division Louis-Chrétien Carrière, Baron de Beaumont
    - Wesphalian Chevauléger Guards Regiment (4 squadrons)
    - Hessian Chevaluléger Guards Regiment (3 squadrons)
    - Brigade Horse Artillery Battery (4 6-pdr guns and 2 6-pdr howitzers)
  - 12th Division, commanded by Général de Division Count Charles Antoine Morand
    - 13th Line Infantry Regiment (5 battalions)
    - 23rd Line Infantry Regiment (4 battalions)
    - 8th Line Infantry Regiment (2 battalions)
    - Brigade Foot Artillery Battery (4 6-pdr guns and 2 6-pdr howitzers)
  - 15th Division (Italians), commanded by Maggiore Generale Achille Fontanelli
    - 1st Italian Line Infantry Regiment (2 battalions)
    - 4th Italian Line Infantry Regiment (3 battalions)
    - 6th Italian Line Infantry Regiment (2 battalions)
    - 7th Italian Line Infantry Regiment (3 battalions)
    - Milan Battalion
    - 1st Italian Light Infantry Regiment (3 battalions)
    - Brigade Foot Artillery Battery (4 6-pdr guns and 2 6-pdr howitzers)
  - 38th Division (Württembergers), commanded by Generalleutnant Friedrich, Graf von Franquemont
    - 1st Combined Line Infantry Battalion
    - 2nd Combined Line Infantry Battalion
    - 3rd Combined Line Infantry Battalion
    - 1st Combined Light Infantry Battalion
    - Brigade Foot Artillery Battery (4 6-pdr guns and 2 6-pdr howitzers)

=== Prussian Forces ===
- I Corps, commanded by Generalleutnant Johann Ludwig, Graf von Yorck (von Wartenburg after the battle)
  - Advance Guard, commanded by Oberst Andreas Georg, Freiherr von Katzler
    - Cavalry Brigade
      - 2nd Life Hussar Regiment (2 squadrons)
      - Brandenburg Hussar Regiment (5 squadrons)
      - Brandenburg Uhlan Regiment (4 squadrons)
      - East Prussian National Cavalry Regiment (5 squadrons)
      - 5th Silesian Landwehr Cavalry Regiment (4 squadrons)
      - 1st Horse Artillery Battery "von Zinker" (8 guns)
    - Brigade
      - Life Grenadier Battalion
      - West Prussian Grenadier Battalion
      - Brandenburg Infantry Regiment (1 battalion)
      - 12th Reserve Infantry Regiment (1st and 3rd battalions)
      - Füsilier Battalion, 2nd East Prussian Infantry Regiment
      - 3 Jäger Companies
      - Rekowsky Landwehr Infantry Battalion
      - Thiele Landwehr Infantry Battalion
      - Wedell Landwehr Infantry Battalion
  - Reserve Cavalry, commanded by Oberst Baron von Wahlen-Jürgass
    - Lithuanian Dragoon Regiment (5 squadrons)
    - Westphalian Dragoon Regiment (4 squadrons)
    - 10th Silesian Landwehr Cavalry Regiment (4 squadrons)
    - 1st Neumark Landwehr Cavalry Regiment (4 squadrons)
    - 2nd Horse Artillery Battery "Wolter" (8 guns)
    - 3rd Horse Artillery Battery "Fischer" (8 guns)
  - Steinmetz Brigade, commanded by Oberst von Steinmetz
    - 1st East Prussian Grenadier Battalion
    - 2nd East Prussian Infantry Regiment (1 battalion)
    - Fischer Landwehr Infantry Battalion
    - Mumm Landwehr Infantry Battalion
    - Seidlitz Landwehr Infantry Battalion
    - Walter Landwehr Infantry Battalion
    - von Cronegk Landwehr Infantry Battalion
    - Larisch Landwehr Infantry Battalion
    - Martitz Landwehr Infantry Battalion
    - 2nd 6-pdr Foot Artillery Battery "Lange" (8 guns)
  - von Mecklenburg Brigade, commanded by Generalmajor Herzog Carl zu Mecklenburg
    - 2nd Life Hussar Regiment (3 squadrons)
    - Mecklenburg–Strelitz Hussar Regiment (4 squadrons)
    - Silesian Grenadier Battalion
    - 1st East Prussian Infantry Regiment (3 battalions)
    - 2nd Battalion, 2nd East Prussian Infantry Regiment
    - Kosecky Landwehr Infantry Battalion
    - 3rd 6-pdr Foot Artillery Battery "Ziegler" (6 guns)
    - 15th 6-pdr Foot Artillery Battery "Anders" (7 guns)
  - von Horn Brigade, commanded by Generalmajor Heinrich Wilhelm von Horn
    - Life Infantry Regiment (3 battalions)
    - Thüringian Infantry Battalion
    - Sommerfeld Landwehr Infantry Battalion
    - Pettingkofer Landwehr Infantry Battalion
    - Reichenback Landwehr Infantry Battalion
    - Knorr-Kottulinsky Landwehr Infantry Battalion
    - 1/2 Foot Artillery Battery (3 guns)
  - von Hünerbein Brigade, commanded by Generalmajor von Hünerbein
    - 2nd and Füsilier Battalions, Brandenburg Infantry Regiment
    - 1st and Füsilier Battalions, 12th Reserve Infantry Regiment
    - Kempky Landwehr Infantry Battalion
    - 12th 6-pdr Foot Artillery Battery "Bully" (8 guns)

== Notes ==
Preceded by Combat of Rosslau	Napoleonic Wars; Battle of Wartenburg	Succeeded by Battle of the Bidassoa
