= Heinrich Wilhelm von Horn =

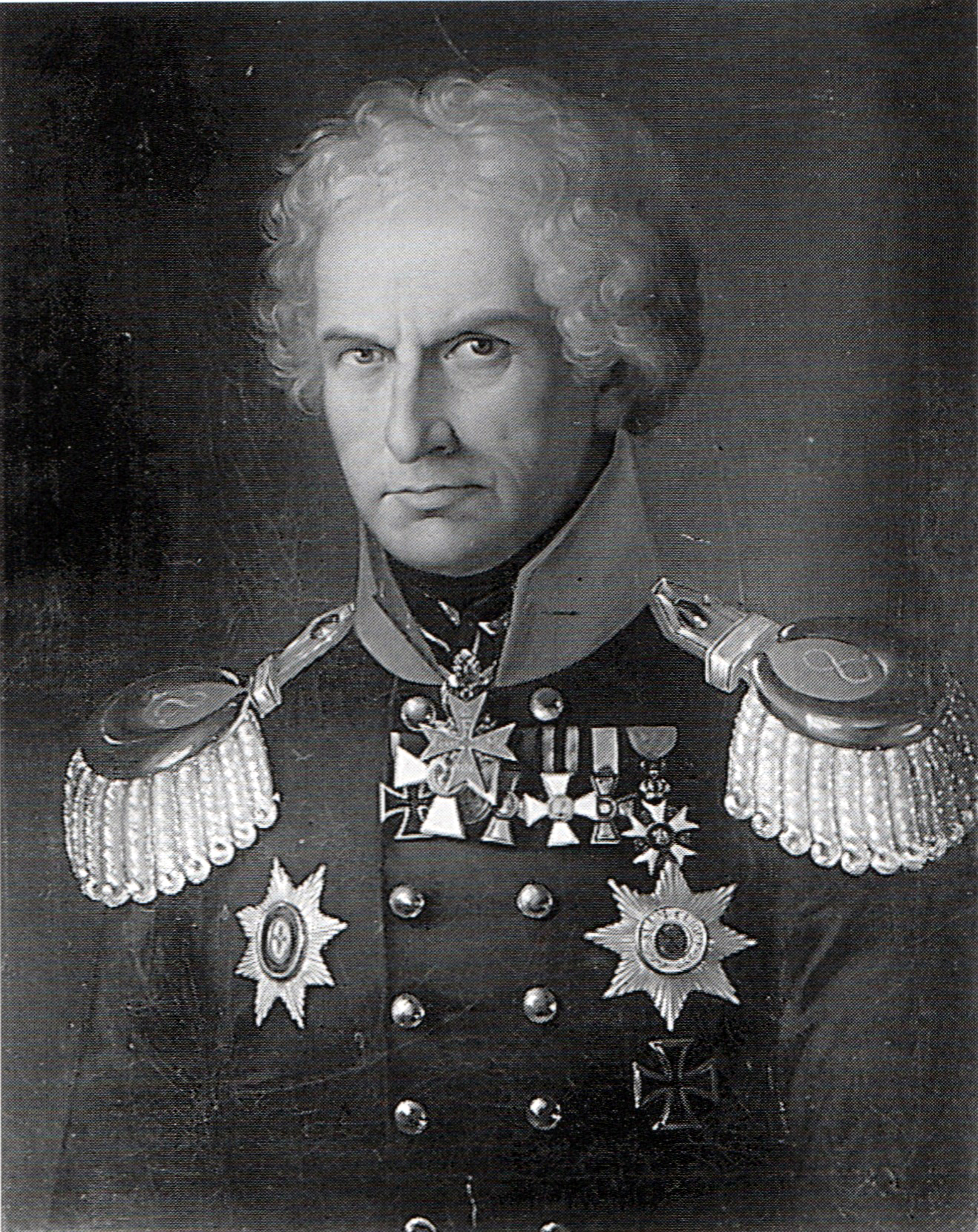
- Born: 31 October 1762; Warmbrunn
- Died: 31 October 1829 (aged 67) Münster
- Allegiance: Kingdom of Prussia
- Branch: Prussian Army
- Rank: Generalleutnant
- Conflicts: War of the Bavarian Succession; Kościuszko Uprising; Napoleonic Wars
- Awards: Pour le Mérite; Legion d'honneur Order of the Red Eagle; Order of the Black Eagle

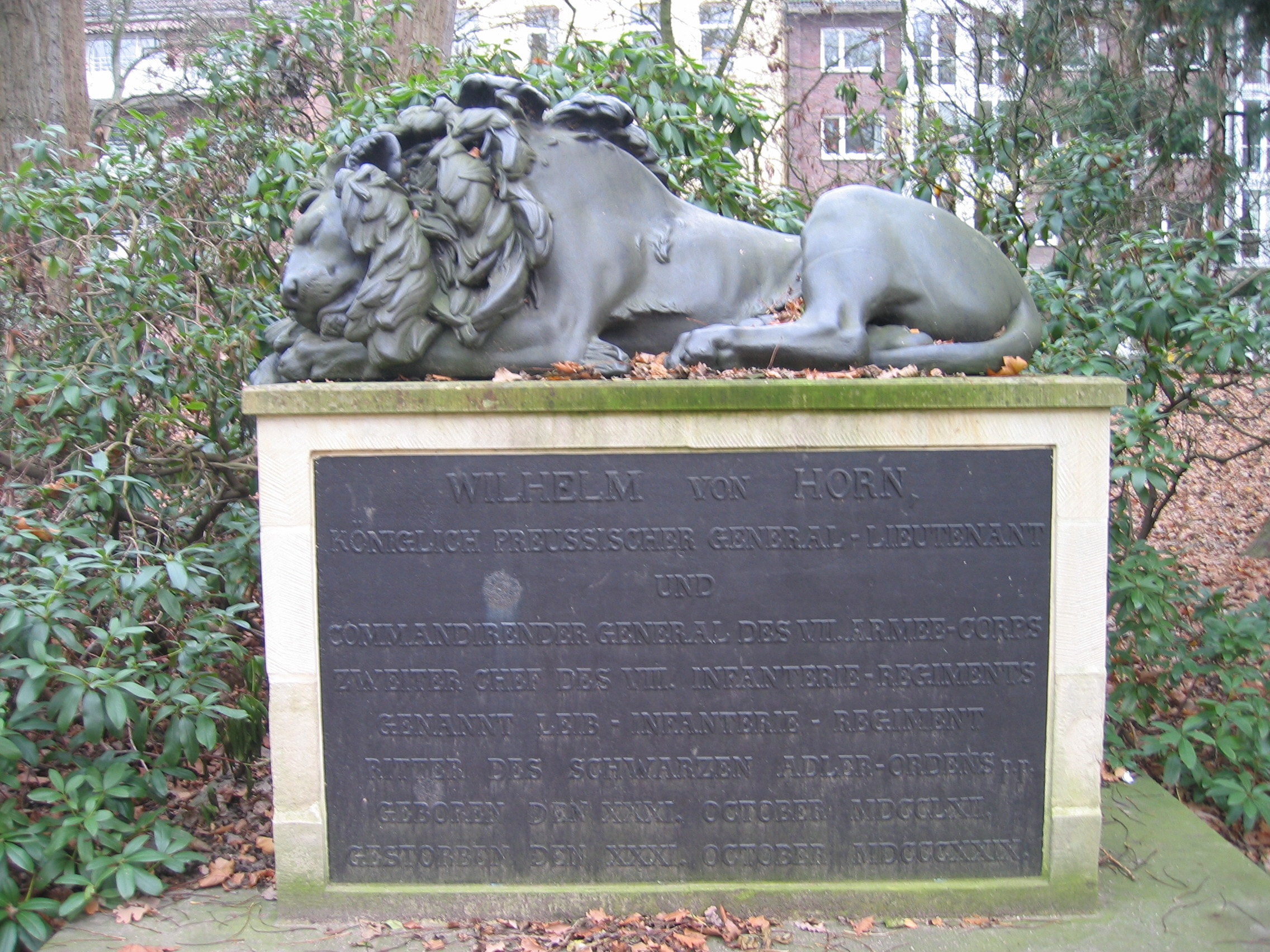
The gravestone of General von Horn in Münster

Heinrich Wilhelm von Horn (31 October 1762–31 October 1829) was a Prussian Lieutenant general who fought in the Napoleonic Wars.

Von Horn was born on 31 October 1762 in Warmbrunn, now Cieplice Śląskie Zdrój in Poland, the son of Johann Christian von Horn (1722–1797) and his wife Maria Rosine née Becker (1724–1794).

Horn attended the cadet school in Berlin, leaving on 25 March 1778 to join the "Luck" Infantry Regiment (Fusileer regiment no. 53), in which he took part in the War of the Bavarian Succession. Whilst in this regiment he met and befriended Ludwig Yorck, with whom he would work closely in the future.

Lieutenant Horn became adjutant to General Franz Andreas von Favrat in 1788, and to Julius von Grawert in 1793. During the Kościuszko Uprising, he fought at the battle of Ravka and the Siege of Warsaw, being awarded the Pour le Mérite on 6 June 1794.

When the Courbiere infantry regiment (number 58) was established in 1797, Horn was given command of one of its Grenadier companies. At the outbreak of the 1806 Campaign, he became a Major, and his regiment was part of the garrison of Danzig. Horn distinguished himself by his valiant defence of the Hagelsberg during the siege of Danzig.

Following the Peace of Tilsit he transferred to the 2nd West Prussia Infantry regiment before becoming Commandant of Kolberg and commander of the newly formed Leib-Infanterie-Regiment (No 8) on 20 August 1808. He would remain associated with this regiment for the rest of his career.

In 1812, Colonel Horn took part in the invasion of Russia, commanding the 2nd Infantry Brigade in Yorck's auxiliary Prussian Corps. On 4 September 1812, he was given permission to wear the French Legion d'honneur.

In the German campaign of 1813, Horn commanded a brigade in Yorck's I Corps of the Army of Silesia. He distinguished himself at the battles of Bautzen, the Katzbach, Wartenburg and Leipzig. During the invasion of France, he fought at Laon and at Paris. In 1815 he led a brigade in the VI Corps that was not involved in the fighting.

After the end of the Napoleonic Wars, Horn was appointed commander of VII Corps headquartered in Münster, a post he held until his death on 31 October 1829.

According to the Allgemeine Deutsche Biographie, "Horn was one of the most excellent brigade commanders of the Prussian army [...] because of his courage, his popular coarseness, his kindness of heart and noble disposition, "the old gentleman" was loved and revered in the army as well as by the people."
