= Brouchy =

- Commune
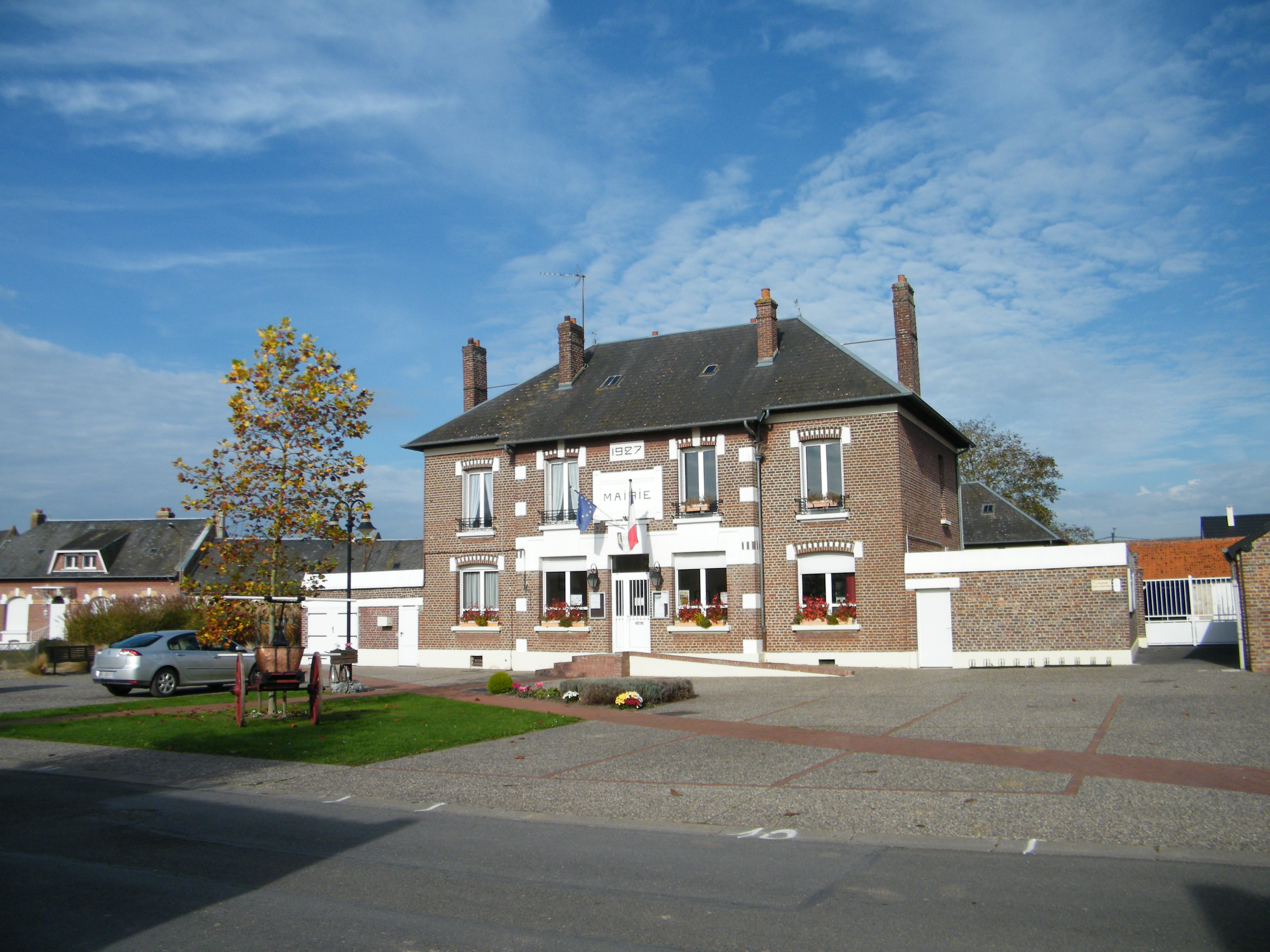
- The town hall in Brouchy

- Coat of arms
- Location of Brouchy
- Location within France Location within Hauts-de-France
- Coordinates: 49°43′04″N 3°06′05″E
- Country: France
- Region: Hauts-de-France
- Department: Somme
- Arrondissement: Péronne
- Canton: Ham
- Intercommunality: CC Est de la Somme

Government
  - Mayor (2020–2026): Marc Barbier
- Area^{1}: 8.07 km^{2} (3.12 sq mi)
- Elevation: 65 m (213 ft)
- Highest elevation: 94 m (308 ft)
- Lowest elevation: 62 m (203 ft)
- Population (2023): 495
  - Density: 61.3/km^{2} (159/sq mi)
- Time zone: UTC+01:00 (CET)
  - Summer (DST): UTC+02:00 (CEST)
- INSEE/Postal code: 80144 /80400
- ^{1} French Land Register data, which excludes lakes, ponds, glaciers > 1 km^{2} (0.386 sq mi or 247 acres) and river estuaries.

Brouchy (French pronunciation: [bʁuʃi]) is a commune in the Somme department in Hauts-de-France in northern France.

== Geography ==
Brouchy is situated on the D4937 road, some 20 miles (32 km) southwest of Saint-Quentin.

== Population ==
Historical population
| Year | Pop. | ±% p.a. |
|---|---|---|
| 1968 | 612 | — |
| 1975 | 618 | +0.14% |
| 1982 | 634 | +0.37% |
| 1990 | 635 | +0.02% |
| 1999 | 578 | −1.04% |
| 2007 | 587 | +0.19% |
| 2012 | 547 | −1.40% |
| 2017 | 512 | −1.31% |
| 2023 | 495 | −0.56% |
Source: INSEE

== See also ==
- Communes of the Somme department
