= Frederic von Franquemont =

German commander in the Napoleonic Wars (1770–1842)

Count Frederic von Franquemont
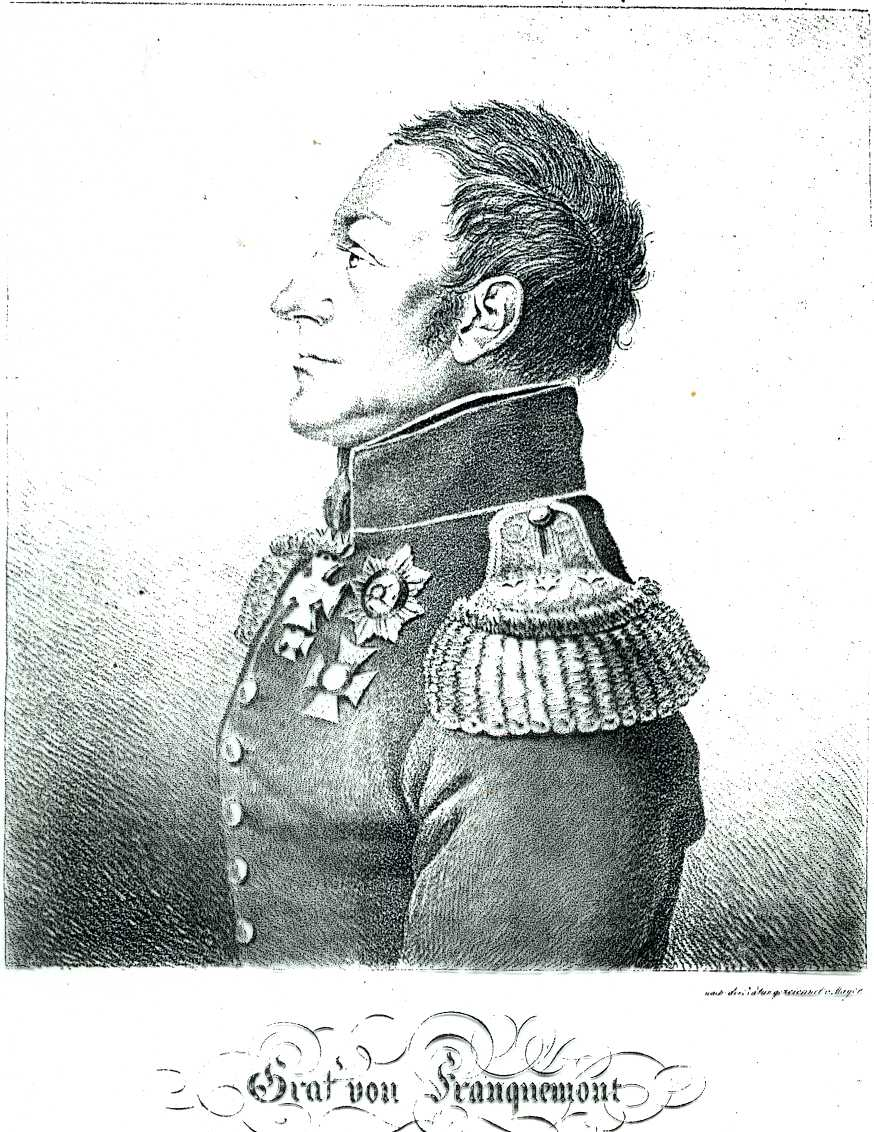
- Born: 5 March 1770; Ludwigsburg
- Died: 2 January 1842 (aged 71)
- Military career
- Allegiance: Württemberg
- Branch: Royal Württemberg Army
- Rank: General of the Infantry
- Conflicts: French Revolutionary Wars; Invasion of Ceylon; Napoleonic Wars; Battle of Wartenburg; Battle of Bautzen; Battle of Leipzig
- Other work: Minister of War

Friedrich von Franquemont (5 March 1770 – 2 January 1842) was a Württembergian general during the Napoleonic Wars and later a Württemberg State Secretary and Minister of War.

== Life ==
Franquemont was born in Ludwigsburg, the son of an illegitimate union of Charles Eugene, Duke of Württemberg (1728–1793) and the dancer Regina Monti. On 5 July 1775, at the age of five, he became a pupil at the Karlsschule Stuttgart. In 1787 he left school and became a 2nd Lieutenant in the Württemberg Cape Regiment, a unit recruited for foreign service and seconded to the Dutch East India Company. He served first in South Africa, then in Batavia. By 1795 he served in Trincomalee on Ceylon, where he was captured by the British. Held in Madras, he was brought to England and was released in 1800.

Then he rejoined the Württemberg Army. He became a captain and rose through the ranks in rapid succession - in 1807 he was a colonel and led the 1st Battalion of the Kronprinz Regiment, in 1808 he was made major general. In 1812 he was a lieutenant general, and in 1814 commanded the Foot Guards. On 6 November 1813, he was promoted to Feldzeugmeister. In the Napoleonic Wars, when the Kingdom of Württemberg was allied with Napoleon, he fought in the Battle of Wartenburg, the Battle of Bautzen, where he was severely wounded, and the Battle of Dennewitz.

In 1815, when Württemberg had joined the Allies, Franquemont was named chief of the Württemberg Expeditionary Corps with the rank of General of the Infantry.

After the war he was appointed Secretary of State and Minister of War, being appointed on 9 November 1816 by William I of Württemberg. From 9 November 1816 to 10 August 1829, he also was a member of the Privy Council. In 1818, King William awarded him with the Grand Cross of the Order of the Crown. In 1819, he was appointed a life member of the Württemberg Chamber of Lords. In 1820, he and Baron Ernst von Hügel reorganized the Württemberg military. In 1823 he ended his career as a minister and became commander of the 6th Infantry Regiment "Crown Prince". In August 1829, he resigned from his post for health reasons.
