= Württemberg Cape Regiment =

Military unit of the Dutch East India Company

- Württembergisches Kapregiment
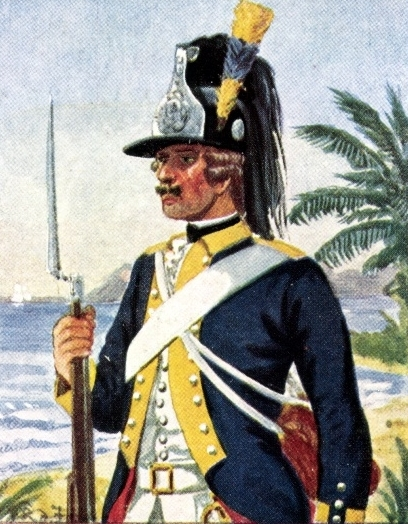
- Soldier of the Württemberg Cape Regiment
- Active: 1787–1808
- Country: Duchy of Württemberg
- Allegiance: Dutch East India Company
- Branch: Army
- Type: Line infantry Artillery
- Role: Internal security
- Size: 3,200

The Württemberg Cape Regiment (German: Württembergisches Kapregiment) was a German military unit which was stationed at the Cape of Good Hope toward the end of the 18th century, in the service of the Dutch East India Company, and which played a considerable part in the cultural life of the Cape at that time.

In 1786 Duke Charles Eugene of Württemberg concluded an agreement with the DEIC to furnish a regiment of 2,000 men to the DEIC for the sum of 300,000 guilders. Any soldiers falling away would be replaced by new recruits on payment of an annual subsidy of 65,000 guilders.

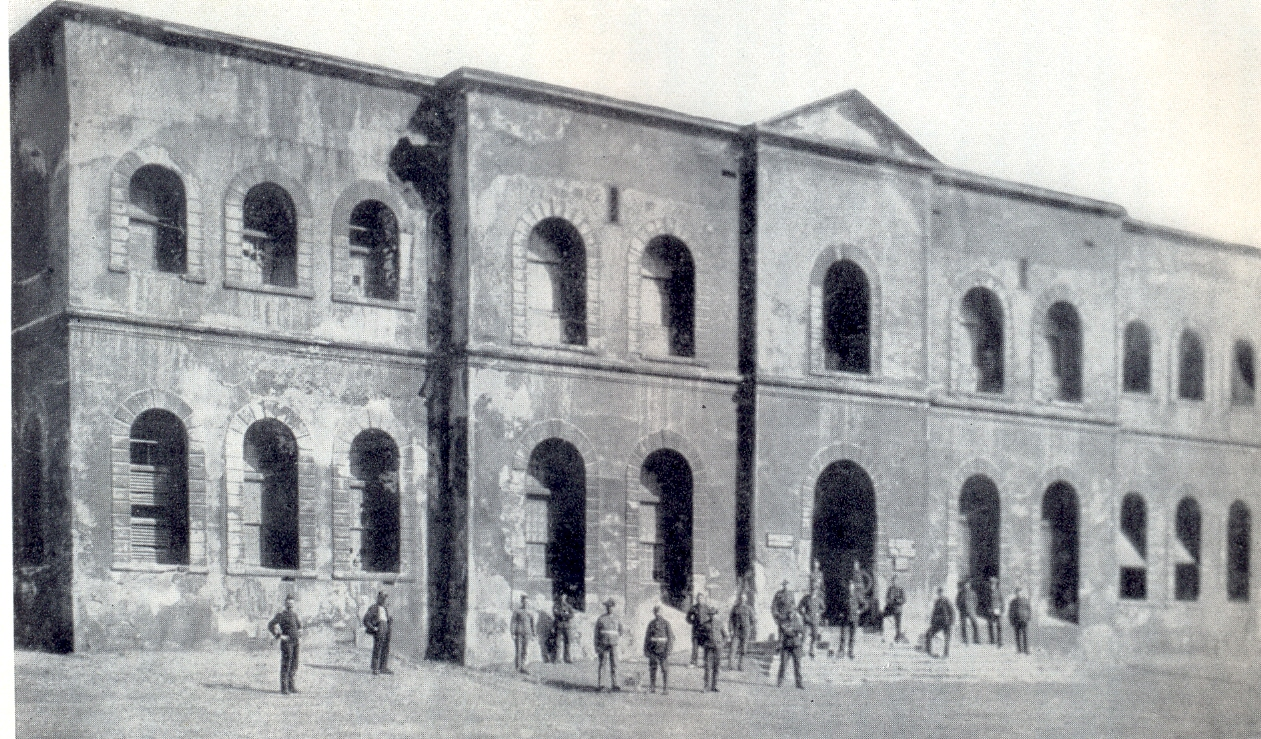
The barracks of the Cape Regiment in Cape Town

As a result, eleven military units under the command of fifty officers were dispatched in 1787 to the Cape via Holland. When they reached their destination seven months later 143 of the recruits had died as a result of privations.

This exodus caused one of the first German poems on South Africa to be written: the Kaplied by Christian Friedrich Daniel Schubart.

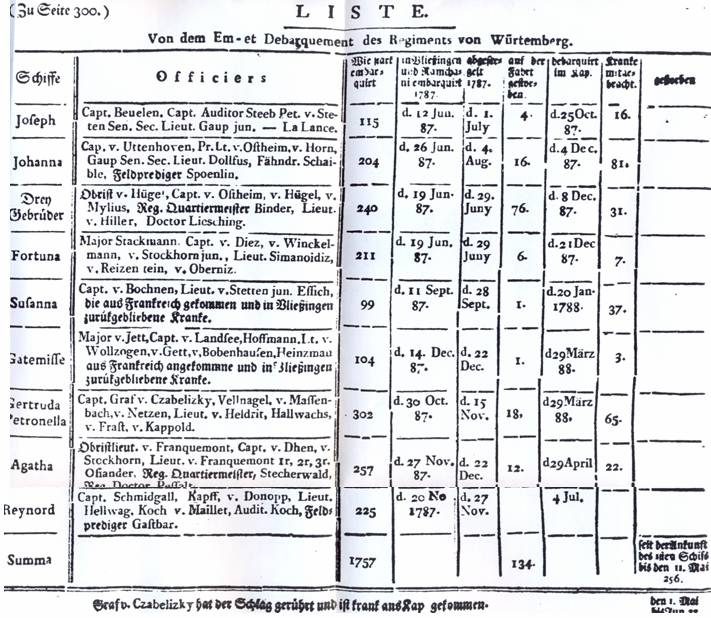
The ship's manifest.

In 1791 most of these soldiers were sent on to India, where almost all of them died. A small group of thirteen non-commissioned officers and soldiers stayed on at the Cape and found a refuge there.

Members of the regiment played a prominent part in the social life of the Cape during their stay. Certain expressions, like swaapstreek (a stupid or foolish prank), were perhaps permanently absorbed by the everyday language at this time.

Among the officers were well-educated men, who had attended the military training school near Stuttgart with the German poet Friedrich Schiller and had been on friendly terms with him - men such as the doctor, Friedrich Ludwig Liesching, and the poet's brother-in-law, Karl van Wolzogen. Some of them, including Liesching, collected botanical and geological specimens.

A reading circle was formed and literary works obtained from Germany. These men also formed an amateur theatrical company, which staged German plays. Several married Cape Town women. Their chaplain, Johann Friedrich Spönlin, effected an improvement in the school system of the Cape. Dr Friedrich Ludwig Liesching became the owner of the largest pharmacy and later was chief of medical services and the hospital in Cape Town.

Captain Johannes Zorn held the position of first landdrost at the Cape, and built the imposing mansion Leeuwenhof, now the official residence of the Premier of the Western Cape. His garden, with its exotic plants and birds, was one of the sights of the town.

Johannes Müller, a common soldier of the regiment, grew rich as a tavern owner, married a slave woman, and in 1817 returned to his fatherland. Here he bought an estate, was ennobled, and lived on in folk-tales as 'der schwarze Baron' (the Black Baron).
