= East Prussian National Cavalry Regiment =

The East Prussian National Cavalry Regiment (German: Ostpreußische National-Kavallerie-Regiment) was a regiment established in 1813.

== History ==
On the orders of Ludwig Yorck von Wartenburg, Count Lehndorff-Steinort began establishing the regiment in February 1813. He was assigned 38 recruits; all others had to be recruited from the ranks of those exempt from military service. The volunteers had to bring their own horses and equipment. All 833 cavalry members came from East and West Prussia.

The regiment was assigned to Blücher's Silesian Army and fought gloriously in the Battles of the Katzbach and Leipzig. Until the Battle of Paris on March 30, 1814, it belonged to the cavalry vanguard of Blücher's army under Major General von Katzler.

Three squadrons of the regiment were used to establish the Life Guard Hussar Regiment in 1815.

== Literature ==
- Albinus, Robert (1985). Königsberg Lexikon. Stadt und Umgebung (in German). Leer: Verlag Gerhard Rautenberg. ISBN 3-7921-0320-6.
- von Selle, Götz (1956). Geschichte der Albertus-Universität zu Königsberg in Preußen (in German) (2nd ed.). Würzburg. p. 262.
