= Battle of La Rothière order of battle =

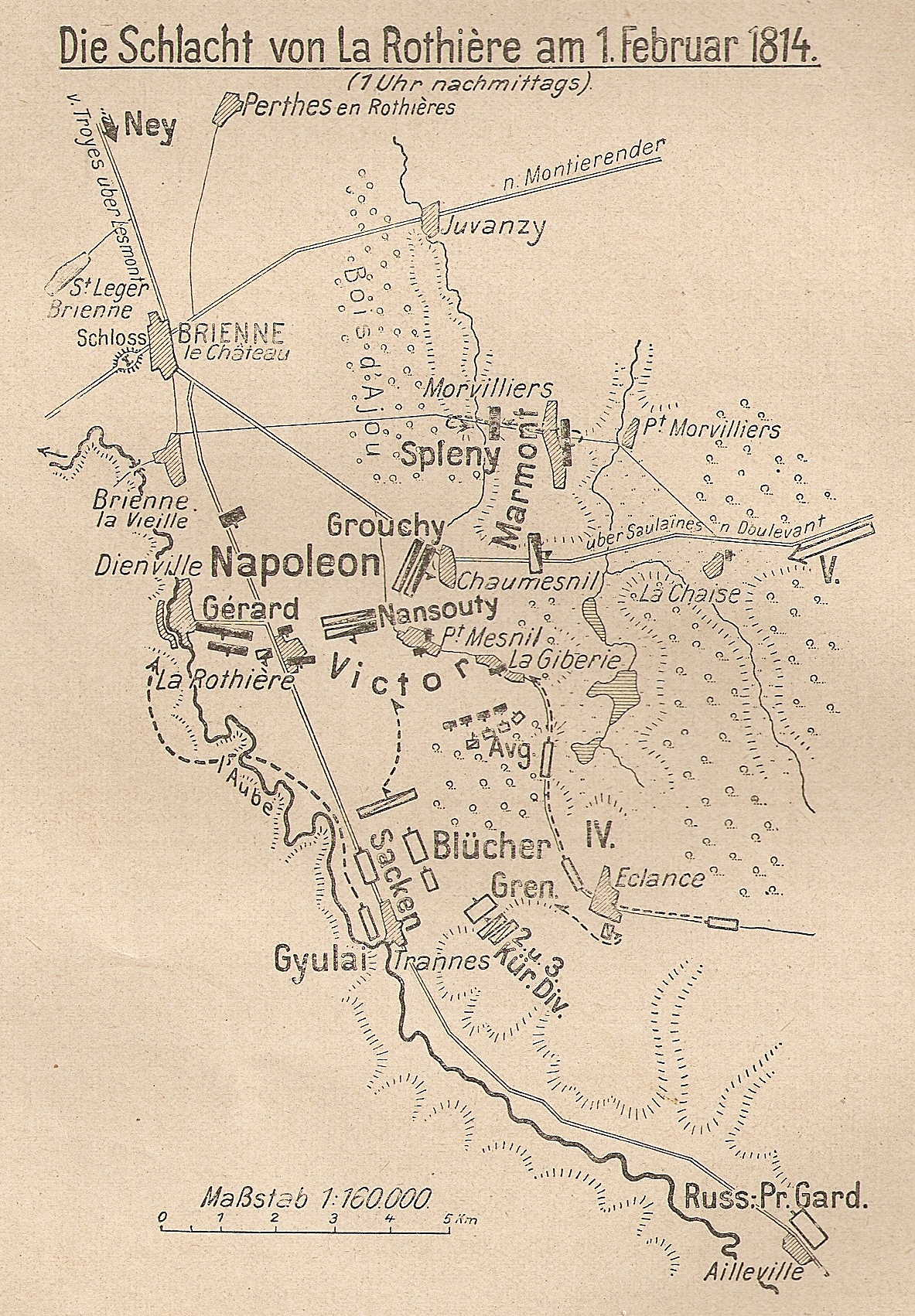
Map of the Battle of La Rothière

The Battle of La Rothière order of battle is shown below. The Battle of La Rothière was fought on 1 February 1814 and was part of the Campaign in north-east France during the War of the Sixth Coalition. An Imperial French army led by Napoleon was defeated by a larger Coalition army commanded by Field Marshal Karl Philipp, Prince of Schwarzenberg and Field Marshal Gebhard Leberecht von Blücher. This order of battle may be used for the Battle of Brienne on 29 January 1814 also.

== Abbreviations ==
- FM = Field Marshal
- GdK = General der Kavallerie
- FZM = Feldzeugmeister
- LG = Lieutenant General
- FML = Feldmarschall-Leutnant
- GM = Generalmajor
- OB = Oberst
- OBL = Oberstleutnant
- Maj = Major
- Gren = Grenadier infantry
- LW = Landwehr
- Inf = Infantry
- Cav = Cavalry
- Art = Artillery
- M = Marshal of the Empire
- GD = General of Division
- GB = General of Brigade
- Col = Colonel
- LC = Lieutenant Colonel
- pdr = pounder
- how = Howitzer
- IR = Infantry Regiment
- Regt = Regiment
- Bn = Battalion
- Sqn = Squadron
- 8/32nd = 8th Bn, 32nd Line IR
- Gd = Imperial Guard

== French Army ==
- Emperor Napoleon

The Imperial French Army at La Rothière on 1 February 1814 counted 36,540 infantry, cavalry, and artillerymen. The Strength column shows unit strengths on 25 January 1814. This may be used for the Battle of Brienne on 29 January. Strengths in parentheses are unit strengths on 1 February 1814 estimated by J. Sporschil. From the 25 January unit strengths, losses at Brienne should be subtracted to get totals for La Rothière. Losses were 3,500 killed, wounded, and missing, plus 11 guns.

French Army - 25 January 1814
Wing	Division	Brigade	Unit	Strength
Right Wing; GD Étienne Maurice Gérard	Paris Reserve; GD François Marie Dufour; 8,291 (3,400)	Brigade; GB Antoine Jarry; 2,325	8/32nd Line IR	673
Right Wing; GD Étienne Maurice Gérard	Paris Reserve; GD François Marie Dufour; 8,291 (3,400)	Brigade; GB Antoine Jarry; 2,325	6/58th Line IR	406
Right Wing; GD Étienne Maurice Gérard	Paris Reserve; GD François Marie Dufour; 8,291 (3,400)	Brigade; GB Antoine Jarry; 2,325	7/12th Light IR	510
Right Wing; GD Étienne Maurice Gérard	Paris Reserve; GD François Marie Dufour; 8,291 (3,400)	Brigade; GB Antoine Jarry; 2,325	6/29th Light IR	736
Right Wing; GD Étienne Maurice Gérard	Paris Reserve; GD François Marie Dufour; 8,291 (3,400)	Brigade; GB Antoine de Belair; 3,493	7/2nd Light IR	600
Right Wing; GD Étienne Maurice Gérard	Paris Reserve; GD François Marie Dufour; 8,291 (3,400)	Brigade; GB Antoine de Belair; 3,493	6/4th Light IR	580
Right Wing; GD Étienne Maurice Gérard	Paris Reserve; GD François Marie Dufour; 8,291 (3,400)	Brigade; GB Antoine de Belair; 3,493	7/15th Light IR	554
Right Wing; GD Étienne Maurice Gérard	Paris Reserve; GD François Marie Dufour; 8,291 (3,400)	Brigade; GB Antoine de Belair; 3,493	3/135th Line IR	554
Right Wing; GD Étienne Maurice Gérard	Paris Reserve; GD François Marie Dufour; 8,291 (3,400)	Brigade; GB Antoine de Belair; 3,493	139th Line IR	369
Right Wing; GD Étienne Maurice Gérard	Paris Reserve; GD François Marie Dufour; 8,291 (3,400)	Brigade; GB Antoine de Belair; 3,493	3/155th Line IR	836
Right Wing; GD Étienne Maurice Gérard	Paris Reserve; GD François Marie Dufour; 8,291 (3,400)	Brigade; GB Louis de Bourmont; 2,173	113th Line IR	2,173
Right Wing; GD Étienne Maurice Gérard	Paris Reserve; GD François Marie Dufour; 8,291 (3,400)	Artillery; 300	Artillery and Train	300
Right Wing; GD Étienne Maurice Gérard	Division; VI Corps; GD Étienne Ricard; 2,307 (3,500)	Brigade; GB Jean Louis Fournier; 858	3/2nd Light IR	112
Right Wing; GD Étienne Maurice Gérard	Division; VI Corps; GD Étienne Ricard; 2,307 (3,500)	Brigade; GB Jean Louis Fournier; 858	3/4th Light IR	136
Right Wing; GD Étienne Maurice Gérard	Division; VI Corps; GD Étienne Ricard; 2,307 (3,500)	Brigade; GB Jean Louis Fournier; 858	2/6th Light IR	197
Right Wing; GD Étienne Maurice Gérard	Division; VI Corps; GD Étienne Ricard; 2,307 (3,500)	Brigade; GB Jean Louis Fournier; 858	3/40th Line IR	223
Right Wing; GD Étienne Maurice Gérard	Division; VI Corps; GD Étienne Ricard; 2,307 (3,500)	Brigade; GB Jean Louis Fournier; 858	2/50th Line IR	190
Right Wing; GD Étienne Maurice Gérard	Division; VI Corps; GD Étienne Ricard; 2,307 (3,500)	Brigade; GB François Boudin de Roville; 1,449	2/65th Line IR	97
Right Wing; GD Étienne Maurice Gérard	Division; VI Corps; GD Étienne Ricard; 2,307 (3,500)	Brigade; GB François Boudin de Roville; 1,449	1/136th Line IR	582
Right Wing; GD Étienne Maurice Gérard	Division; VI Corps; GD Étienne Ricard; 2,307 (3,500)	Brigade; GB François Boudin de Roville; 1,449	1/138th LIne IR	108
Right Wing; GD Étienne Maurice Gérard	Division; VI Corps; GD Étienne Ricard; 2,307 (3,500)	Brigade; GB François Boudin de Roville; 1,449	1/142nd Line IR	95
Right Wing; GD Étienne Maurice Gérard	Division; VI Corps; GD Étienne Ricard; 2,307 (3,500)	Brigade; GB François Boudin de Roville; 1,449	1/144th Line IR	306
Right Wing; GD Étienne Maurice Gérard	Division; VI Corps; GD Étienne Ricard; 2,307 (3,500)	Brigade; GB François Boudin de Roville; 1,449	1/145th Line IR	261
Right Wing; GD Étienne Maurice Gérard	Cavalry; 915 (500)	23rd Cavalry Brigade; GB Cyrille Picquet; 915	10th Hussar Regt	548
Right Wing; GD Étienne Maurice Gérard	Cavalry; 915 (500)	23rd Cavalry Brigade; GB Cyrille Picquet; 915	1st Honor Gd Regt	367
Center; M Claude Victor	1st Division; II Corps; GD Jean-Baptiste Jamin; 2,723	Brigade unknown 1,160	1/24th Light IR	520
Center; M Claude Victor	1st Division; II Corps; GD Jean-Baptiste Jamin; 2,723	Brigade unknown 1,160	1/19th Line IR	640
Center; M Claude Victor	1st Division; II Corps; GD Jean-Baptiste Jamin; 2,723	GB Louis Huguet-Chateau (Note: The Brienne chateau was captured by 400 men of the 37th and 56th Line. (Nafziger 2015, p. 96) These were part of GB Louis Huguet-Chateau's brigade. (Petre, p. 23)); 1,563	1/37th Line IR	601
Center; M Claude Victor	1st Division; II Corps; GD Jean-Baptiste Jamin; 2,723	GB Louis Huguet-Chateau; 1,563	1/56th Line IR	962
Center; M Claude Victor	2nd Division; II Corps; GD François Forestier (Note: Forestier was killed at Brienne. (Smith, p. 491) It is not clear who commanded the division at La Rothière.); 3,347	Brigades unknown 3,347	1/26th Line IR (Note: Smith stated that the 26th Light in Forestier's division suffered heavy losses at Brienne and was reduced to 150 men (Smith, p. 491).)	801
Center; M Claude Victor	2nd Division; II Corps; GD François Forestier; 3,347	Brigades unknown 3,347	18th Line IR	1,385
Center; M Claude Victor	2nd Division; II Corps; GD François Forestier; 3,347	Brigades unknown 3,347	1/46th Line IR	753
Center; M Claude Victor	2nd Division; II Corps; GD François Forestier; 3,347	Brigades unknown 3,347	93rd Line IR	408
Center; M Claude Victor	3rd Division; II Corps; GD Guillaume Duhesme; 2,662 (6,100) (Note: Nafziger's account only mentioned Duhesme's division at La Rothière and credited it with 4,200 men. It also noted that there were 1,900 other soldiers defending La Gibre village (Nafziger 2015, p. 583).)	Brigades unknown 2,662	2/11th Line IR	496
Center; M Claude Victor	3rd Division; II Corps; GD Guillaume Duhesme; 2,662 (6,100)	Brigades unknown 2,662	2/2nd Line IR	405
Center; M Claude Victor	3rd Division; II Corps; GD Guillaume Duhesme; 2,662 (6,100)	Brigades unknown 2,662	4th Line IR	1,237
Center; M Claude Victor	3rd Division; II Corps; GD Guillaume Duhesme; 2,662 (6,100)	Brigades unknown 2,662	2/72nd Line IR	524
Center; M Claude Victor	II Corps Artillery; 1,142	Not brigaded 1,142	17/1st Foot Art Regt, 12-pdr	989
Center; M Claude Victor	II Corps Artillery; 1,142	Not brigaded 1,142	7/2nd Foot Art Reg, 6-pdr	989
Center; M Claude Victor	II Corps Artillery; 1,142	Not brigaded 1,142	19/2nd Foot Art Reg, 6-pdr	989
Center; M Claude Victor	II Corps Artillery; 1,142	Not brigaded 1,142	9th Foot Art Regt, 6-pdr	989
Center; M Claude Victor	II Corps Artillery; 1,142	Not brigaded 1,142	1st & 4th Horse Art Regt	989
Center; M Claude Victor	II Corps Artillery; 1,142	Not brigaded 1,142	Engineers	153
Center; M Claude Victor	1st Cavalry Division; Imperial Gd; GD Pierre de Colbert (880)	Not brigaded 3,141	1st Gd Lancer Regt	600
Center; M Claude Victor	1st Cavalry Division; Imperial Gd; GD Pierre de Colbert (880)	Not brigaded 3,141	Gd Horse Chasseur Regt	585
Center; M Claude Victor	1st Cavalry Division; Imperial Gd; GD Pierre de Colbert (880)	Not brigaded 3,141	Gd Empress Dragoon Regt	734
Center; M Claude Victor	1st Cavalry Division; Imperial Gd; GD Pierre de Colbert (880)	Not brigaded 3,141	Gd Horse Gren Regt	909
Center; M Claude Victor	1st Cavalry Division; Imperial Gd; GD Pierre de Colbert (880)	Not brigaded 3,141	2nd Eclaireur Regt	313
Center; M Claude Victor	2nd Cavalry Division; Imperial Gd; GD Charles Lefebvre-Desnouettes (850)	Not brigaded	2nd Gd Lancer Regt	-
Center; M Claude Victor	2nd Cavalry Division; Imperial Gd; GD Charles Lefebvre-Desnouettes (850)	Not brigaded	Gd Horse Chasseur Regt	-
Center; M Claude Victor	2nd Cavalry Division; Imperial Gd; GD Charles Lefebvre-Desnouettes (850)	Not brigaded	Gd Empress Dragoon Regt	-
Center; M Claude Victor	2nd Cavalry Division; Imperial Gd; GD Charles Lefebvre-Desnouettes (850)	Not brigaded	Gd Horse Gren Regt	-
Center; M Claude Victor	Gd Service Squadrons; GD Claude-Étienne Guyot (750)	Not brigaded	Gd Horse Gren & Chasseur	-
Center; M Claude Victor	Gd Service Squadrons; GD Claude-Étienne Guyot (750)	Not brigaded	Gd Dragoon & 1st Lancer	-
Center; M Claude Victor	9th Light Cavalry Division; V Cavalry Corps; GD Hippolyte Piré; 1,050 (870)	1st Brigade; GB Jacques Subervie; 485	3rd Hussar Regt	278
Center; M Claude Victor	9th Light Cavalry Division; V Cavalry Corps; GD Hippolyte Piré; 1,050 (870)	1st Brigade; GB Jacques Subervie; 485	26th Horse Chasseur Regt	207
Center; M Claude Victor	9th Light Cavalry Division; V Cavalry Corps; GD Hippolyte Piré; 1,050 (870)	2nd Brigade; GB Pantaleon d'Hericourt; 565	14th Horse Chasseur Regt	234
Center; M Claude Victor	9th Light Cavalry Division; V Cavalry Corps; GD Hippolyte Piré; 1,050 (870)	2nd Brigade; GB Pantaleon d'Hericourt; 565	27th Horse Chasseur Regt	331
Center; M Claude Victor	5th Heavy Cavalry Division; V Cavalry Corps; GD André Briche; 1,590 (1,250)	1st Brigade; GB Gabriel Montelegier; 1,037	2nd Dragoon Regt	349
Center; M Claude Victor	5th Heavy Cavalry Division; V Cavalry Corps; GD André Briche; 1,590 (1,250)	1st Brigade; GB Gabriel Montelegier; 1,037	6th Dragoon Regt	321
Center; M Claude Victor	5th Heavy Cavalry Division; V Cavalry Corps; GD André Briche; 1,590 (1,250)	1st Brigade; GB Gabriel Montelegier; 1,037	11th Dragoon Regt	367
Center; M Claude Victor	5th Heavy Cavalry Division; V Cavalry Corps; GD André Briche; 1,590 (1,250)	2nd Brigade; GB Denis Éloi Ludot; 553	13th Dragoon Regt	220
Center; M Claude Victor	5th Heavy Cavalry Division; V Cavalry Corps; GD André Briche; 1,590 (1,250)	2nd Brigade; GB Denis Éloi Ludot; 553	15th Dragoon Regt	333
Center; M Claude Victor	6th Heavy Cavalry Division; V Cavalry Corps; GD Samuel-François Lhéritier; 1,164 (1,000)	1st Brigade; GB Auguste Lamotte; 618	18th Dragoon Regt	218
Center; M Claude Victor	6th Heavy Cavalry Division; V Cavalry Corps; GD Samuel-François Lhéritier; 1,164 (1,000)	1st Brigade; GB Auguste Lamotte; 618	19th Dragoon Regt	246
Center; M Claude Victor	6th Heavy Cavalry Division; V Cavalry Corps; GD Samuel-François Lhéritier; 1,164 (1,000)	1st Brigade; GB Auguste Lamotte; 618	20th Dragoon Regt	154
Center; M Claude Victor	6th Heavy Cavalry Division; V Cavalry Corps; GD Samuel-François Lhéritier; 1,164 (1,000)	2nd Brigade; GB Jean Antoine de Collaert; 546	22nd Dragoon Regt	283
Center; M Claude Victor	6th Heavy Cavalry Division; V Cavalry Corps; GD Samuel-François Lhéritier; 1,164 (1,000)	2nd Brigade; GB Jean Antoine de Collaert; 546	25th Dragoon Regt	263
Center; M Claude Victor	V Cavalry Corps Artillery; 319	Artillery; Col Martin Etchegoyen; 319	4/2nd Horse Art Regt; 4 x 6-pdr, 2 x how	319
Center; M Claude Victor	V Cavalry Corps Artillery; 319	Artillery; Col Martin Etchegoyen; 319	2/3rd Horse Art Regt; 4 x 6-pdr, 2 x how	319
Left Wing; M Auguste de Marmont	Division; VI Corps; GD Joseph Lagrange; 2,867 (4,600)	Brigade; GB Joseph Antoine Joubert; 1,305	3/23rd Line IR	76
Left Wing; M Auguste de Marmont	Division; VI Corps; GD Joseph Lagrange; 2,867 (4,600)	Brigade; GB Joseph Antoine Joubert; 1,305	37th Line IR	721
Left Wing; M Auguste de Marmont	Division; VI Corps; GD Joseph Lagrange; 2,867 (4,600)	Brigade; GB Joseph Antoine Joubert; 1,305	1st Marine Regt	508
Left Wing; M Auguste de Marmont	Division; VI Corps; GD Joseph Lagrange; 2,867 (4,600)	Brigade; GB Pierre Pelleport; 1,562	2nd Marine Regt	740
Left Wing; M Auguste de Marmont	Division; VI Corps; GD Joseph Lagrange; 2,867 (4,600)	Brigade; GB Pierre Pelleport; 1,562	3rd Marine Regt	543
Left Wing; M Auguste de Marmont	Division; VI Corps; GD Joseph Lagrange; 2,867 (4,600)	Brigade; GB Pierre Pelleport; 1,562	4th Marine Regt	279
Left Wing; M Auguste de Marmont	Division; VI Corps; GD Étienne Lefol (Note: In Nafziger's orders of battle, Lefol's division was apparently absorbed into Lagrange's division at La Rothière (Nafziger 2015, pp. 577, 584).); 1,950	Brigade; Unknown commander 863	3/9th Light IR	130
Left Wing; M Auguste de Marmont	Division; VI Corps; GD Étienne Lefol; 1,950	Brigade; Unknown commander 863	2/16th Light IR	199
Left Wing; M Auguste de Marmont	Division; VI Corps; GD Étienne Lefol; 1,950	Brigade; Unknown commander 863	4/1st Line IR	194
Left Wing; M Auguste de Marmont	Division; VI Corps; GD Étienne Lefol; 1,950	Brigade; Unknown commander 863	3/15th Line IR	340
Left Wing; M Auguste de Marmont	Division; VI Corps; GD Étienne Lefol; 1,950	Brigade; GB Pierre Clavel; 1,087	4/16th Line IR	120
Left Wing; M Auguste de Marmont	Division; VI Corps; GD Étienne Lefol; 1,950	Brigade; GB Pierre Clavel; 1,087	62nd Line IR	228
Left Wing; M Auguste de Marmont	Division; VI Corps; GD Étienne Lefol; 1,950	Brigade; GB Pierre Clavel; 1,087	2/70th Line IR	339
Left Wing; M Auguste de Marmont	Division; VI Corps; GD Étienne Lefol; 1,950	Brigade; GB Pierre Clavel; 1,087	121st Line IR	400
Left Wing; M Auguste de Marmont	VI Corps Artillery; 861	Artillery; 539	3rd Foot Art Regt (3 cos.)	539
Left Wing; M Auguste de Marmont	VI Corps Artillery; 861	Artillery; 539	5th Foot Art Regt (2 cos.)	539
Left Wing; M Auguste de Marmont	VI Corps Artillery; 861	Artillery; 539	2/1st Horse Art Regt	539
Left Wing; M Auguste de Marmont	VI Corps Artillery; 861	Engineers - 322	3 Sapper Bns	322
Left Wing; M Auguste de Marmont	I Cavalry Corps; GD Jean-Pierre Doumerc; 2,091 (1,800)	1st Brigade (Note: Nafziger's order of battle stated Picquet was the commander, but Picquet led the Right Wing cavalry (Nafziger 2015, p. 584).); 704	1st Provisional Hussar Regt	272
Left Wing; M Auguste de Marmont	I Cavalry Corps; GD Jean-Pierre Doumerc; 2,091 (1,800)	1st Brigade; 704	2nd Provisional Chasseur Regt	432
Left Wing; M Auguste de Marmont	I Cavalry Corps; GD Jean-Pierre Doumerc; 2,091 (1,800)	2nd Brigade; GB Charles d'Audenarde; 1,196	3rd Provisional Cuirassier Regt	614
Left Wing; M Auguste de Marmont	I Cavalry Corps; GD Jean-Pierre Doumerc; 2,091 (1,800)	2nd Brigade; GB Charles d'Audenarde; 1,196	4th Provisional Dragoon Regt	582
Left Wing; M Auguste de Marmont	I Cavalry Corps; GD Jean-Pierre Doumerc; 2,091 (1,800)	I Cavalry Corps Artillery; Col Claude-Joseph Lavoy - 191	3/1st Horse Art Regt; 6 guns	191
Reserves; M Michel Ney	1st Young Guard Division; GD Claude Marie Meunier; 4,144 (3,000)	Brigade; GB Jean Clément-Lacoste; 1,597	1st Voltigeur Regt	657
Reserves; M Michel Ney	1st Young Guard Division; GD Claude Marie Meunier; 4,144 (3,000)	Brigade; GB Jean Clément-Lacoste; 1,597	2nd Voltigeur Regt	940
Reserves; M Michel Ney	1st Young Guard Division; GD Claude Marie Meunier; 4,144 (3,000)	Brigade; GB Guillaume Rousseau; 2,407	3rd Voltigeur Regt	1,263
Reserves; M Michel Ney	1st Young Guard Division; GD Claude Marie Meunier; 4,144 (3,000)	Brigade; GB Guillaume Rousseau; 2,407	4th Voltigeur Regt	1,144
Reserves; M Michel Ney	1st Young Guard Division; GD Claude Marie Meunier; 4,144 (3,000)	Artillery - 140 (129)	Artillery and Train	140
Reserves; M Michel Ney	2nd Young Guard Division; GD Pierre Decouz (Note: Decouz was mortally wounded at Brienne. He was replaced by Admiral Pierre Baste who was also fatally wounded (Nafziger 2015, p. 96).); GD Philibert Curial; 2,700 (1,800)	Brigade; GB Jean-Jacques Pelet; 1,313	5th Voltigeur Regt	680
Reserves; M Michel Ney	2nd Young Guard Division; GD Pierre Decouz; GD Philibert Curial; 2,700 (1,800)	Brigade; GB Jean-Jacques Pelet; 1,313	6th Voltigeur Regt	633
Reserves; M Michel Ney	2nd Young Guard Division; GD Pierre Decouz; GD Philibert Curial; 2,700 (1,800)	Brigade; GB Auguste Bigarré; 1,387	7th Voltigeur Regt	717
Reserves; M Michel Ney	2nd Young Guard Division; GD Pierre Decouz; GD Philibert Curial; 2,700 (1,800)	Brigade; GB Auguste Bigarré; 1,387	8th Voltigeur Regt	670
Reserves; M Michel Ney	2nd Young Guard Division; GD Pierre Decouz; GD Philibert Curial; 2,700 (1,800)	Artillery	Artillery and Train	-
Reserves; M Michel Ney	5th Young Guard Division; GD Henri Rottembourg; 4,947 (4,900)	Brigades unknown 4,947	1st Tirailleur Regt	800
Reserves; M Michel Ney	5th Young Guard Division; GD Henri Rottembourg; 4,947 (4,900)	Brigades unknown 4,947	5th Tirailleur Regt	959
Reserves; M Michel Ney	5th Young Guard Division; GD Henri Rottembourg; 4,947 (4,900)	Brigades unknown 4,947	6th Tirailleur Regt	733
Reserves; M Michel Ney	5th Young Guard Division; GD Henri Rottembourg; 4,947 (4,900)	Brigades unknown 4,947	7th Tirailleur Regt	811
Reserves; M Michel Ney	5th Young Guard Division; GD Henri Rottembourg; 4,947 (4,900)	Brigades unknown 4,947	8th Tirailleur Regt	990
Reserves; M Michel Ney	5th Young Guard Division; GD Henri Rottembourg; 4,947 (4,900)	Brigades unknown 4,947	Flanqueur-Chasseur Regt	312
Reserves; M Michel Ney	5th Young Guard Division; GD Henri Rottembourg; 4,947 (4,900)	Brigades unknown 4,947	2 Foot Art Companies	342
Reserves; M Michel Ney	Gd Artillery; 1,464	Not brigaded 1,464	7 Gd Foot Art Companies	459
Reserves; M Michel Ney	Gd Artillery; 1,464	Not brigaded 1,464	4 Gd Horse Art Companies	319
Reserves; M Michel Ney	Gd Artillery; 1,464	Not brigaded 1,464	Pontoniers	21
Reserves; M Michel Ney	Gd Artillery; 1,464	Not brigaded 1,464	Artillery Train	665
Reserves; M Michel Ney	Cavalry Division; GD Jean-Marie Defrance; 1,069	Brigade; GB Philippe, Count Ségur; 1,069	3rd Honor Gd Regt	750
Reserves; M Michel Ney	Cavalry Division; GD Jean-Marie Defrance; 1,069	Brigade; GB Philippe, Count Ségur; 1,069	4th Honor Gd Regt	319

== Coalition Army ==
- FM Gebhard Leberecht von Blücher

=== Left Wing ===
- FZM Ignaz Gyulai

The Coalition 3rd Corps was made up entirely of Austrian units. Austrian position or support batteries were armed with four 6- of 12-pounder cannons and two 7-pounder howitzers. Cavalry batteries consisted of four 6-pounders and two 7-pounder howitzers. Brigade Batteries were armed with eight 3- or 6-pounder cannons.

Coalition Left Wing - 1 February 1814
Corps	Division	Brigade	Unit	Strength
3rd Corps; FZM Ignaz Gyulai; 12,000 inf, 1,500 cav, 56 guns	Division; FML Louis Charles Folliot de Crenneville	Brigade; GM Joseph von Haecht	Klenau Chevau-léger Regt; Nr. 5	7 sqns
3rd Corps; FZM Ignaz Gyulai; 12,000 inf, 1,500 cav, 56 guns	Division; FML Louis Charles Folliot de Crenneville	Brigade; GM Joseph von Haecht	St. George Grenz IR Nr. 6	1 bn
3rd Corps; FZM Ignaz Gyulai; 12,000 inf, 1,500 cav, 56 guns	Division; FML Louis Charles Folliot de Crenneville	Brigade; GM Joseph von der Trenck	Rosenberg Dragoon Regt Nr. 6	6 sqns
3rd Corps; FZM Ignaz Gyulai; 12,000 inf, 1,500 cav, 56 guns	Division; FML Louis Charles Folliot de Crenneville	Brigade; GM Joseph von der Trenck	St. George Grenz IR Nr. 6	1 bn
3rd Corps; FZM Ignaz Gyulai; 12,000 inf, 1,500 cav, 56 guns	Division; FML Louis Charles Folliot de Crenneville	Brigade; GM Joseph von der Trenck	Cavalry Battery	6 x 6-pdr
3rd Corps; FZM Ignaz Gyulai; 12,000 inf, 1,500 cav, 56 guns	Division; FML Jean Hennequin de Fresnel	Brigade; GM Philipp Pflüger von Lindenfels	Archduke Ludwig IR Nr. 8	4 bns
3rd Corps; FZM Ignaz Gyulai; 12,000 inf, 1,500 cav, 56 guns	Division; FML Jean Hennequin de Fresnel	Brigade; GM Philipp Pflüger von Lindenfels	Würzburg IR Nr. 7	3 bns
3rd Corps; FZM Ignaz Gyulai; 12,000 inf, 1,500 cav, 56 guns	Division; FML Jean Hennequin de Fresnel	Brigade; GM Philipp Pflüger von Lindenfels	Brigade Battery	8 x 6-pdr
3rd Corps; FZM Ignaz Gyulai; 12,000 inf, 1,500 cav, 56 guns	Division; FML Jean Hennequin de Fresnel	Brigade; GM Markus von Csollich	Kottulinsky IR Nr. 41	3 bns, 2,214
3rd Corps; FZM Ignaz Gyulai; 12,000 inf, 1,500 cav, 56 guns	Division; FML Jean Hennequin de Fresnel	Brigade; GM Markus von Csollich	Kaiser IR Nr. 1	2 bns, 1,558
3rd Corps; FZM Ignaz Gyulai; 12,000 inf, 1,500 cav, 56 guns	Division; FML Jean Hennequin de Fresnel	Brigade; GM Markus von Csollich	Brigade Battery	8 x 6-pdr
3rd Corps; FZM Ignaz Gyulai; 12,000 inf, 1,500 cav, 56 guns	Division; FML Prince Louis Hohenlohe	Brigade; GM Franz Splény de Milháldy	Mariassy IR Nr. 37	2 bns
3rd Corps; FZM Ignaz Gyulai; 12,000 inf, 1,500 cav, 56 guns	Division; FML Prince Louis Hohenlohe	Brigade; GM Franz Splény de Milháldy	Ignaz Giulay IR Nr. 60	2 bns
3rd Corps; FZM Ignaz Gyulai; 12,000 inf, 1,500 cav, 56 guns	Division; FML Prince Louis Hohenlohe	Brigade; GM Franz Splény de Milháldy	Brigade Battery	8 x 6-pdr
3rd Corps; FZM Ignaz Gyulai; 12,000 inf, 1,500 cav, 56 guns	Division; FML Prince Louis Hohenlohe	Brigade; GM Anton Grimmer von Riesenburg	Kollowrat IR Nr. 36	2 bns, 1,602
3rd Corps; FZM Ignaz Gyulai; 12,000 inf, 1,500 cav, 56 guns	Division; FML Prince Louis Hohenlohe	Brigade; GM Anton Grimmer von Riesenburg	Frölich IR Nr. 28	3 bns, 2,790
3rd Corps; FZM Ignaz Gyulai; 12,000 inf, 1,500 cav, 56 guns	Division; FML Prince Louis Hohenlohe	Brigade; GM Anton Grimmer von Riesenburg	Brigade Battery	8 x 6-pdr
3rd Corps; FZM Ignaz Gyulai; 12,000 inf, 1,500 cav, 56 guns	Corps Artillery	Not brigaded	Position Battery	6 x 12-pdr
3rd Corps; FZM Ignaz Gyulai; 12,000 inf, 1,500 cav, 56 guns	Corps Artillery	Not brigaded	Position Battery	6 x 6-pdr
3rd Corps; FZM Ignaz Gyulai; 12,000 inf, 1,500 cav, 56 guns	Corps Artillery	Not brigaded	Position Battery	6 x 6-pdr

=== Center ===
- General of Infantry Fabian Gottlieb von der Osten-Sacken

Each Russian battery was armed with twelve 6- or 12-pounder cannons.

Coalition Center - 1 February 1814
Corps	Division	Brigade	Unit	Strength
Russian 11th Corps; GM Johann von Lieven; 8,000 inf, 36 guns	10th Division; GM Andrei Andreevich Zass	Brigade; GM Iosif Karlovich Sokolovsky	Jaroslavl IR	1 bn
Russian 11th Corps; GM Johann von Lieven; 8,000 inf, 36 guns	10th Division; GM Andrei Andreevich Zass	Brigade; GM Iosif Karlovich Sokolovsky	Kursk IR	1 bn
Russian 11th Corps; GM Johann von Lieven; 8,000 inf, 36 guns	10th Division; GM Andrei Andreevich Zass	Brigade; GM Iosif Karlovich Sokolovsky	Bieloserk IR	2 bns
Russian 11th Corps; GM Johann von Lieven; 8,000 inf, 36 guns	10th Division; GM Andrei Andreevich Zass	Brigade; Col Achlestischev	8th Jager Regt	1 bn
Russian 11th Corps; GM Johann von Lieven; 8,000 inf, 36 guns	10th Division; GM Andrei Andreevich Zass	Brigade; Col Achlestischev	39th Jager Regt	1 bn
Russian 11th Corps; GM Johann von Lieven; 8,000 inf, 36 guns	10th Division; GM Andrei Andreevich Zass	Brigade; LC Selivanov (Note: Brigade attached from 16th Division (Nafziger 2015, p. 587).)	Kamchatka IR	1 bn
Russian 11th Corps; GM Johann von Lieven; 8,000 inf, 36 guns	10th Division; GM Andrei Andreevich Zass	Brigade; LC Selivanov	Okhotsk IR	1 bn
Russian 11th Corps; GM Johann von Lieven; 8,000 inf, 36 guns	27th Division; LG Maxim Fyodorovich Stavitzky	Brigade; Col Lewandowsky	Odessa IR	1 bn
Russian 11th Corps; GM Johann von Lieven; 8,000 inf, 36 guns	27th Division; LG Maxim Fyodorovich Stavitzky	Brigade; Col Lewandowsky	Vilna IR	1 bn
Russian 11th Corps; GM Johann von Lieven; 8,000 inf, 36 guns	27th Division; LG Maxim Fyodorovich Stavitzky	Brigade; Col Alexejev	Simbrisk IR	1 bn
Russian 11th Corps; GM Johann von Lieven; 8,000 inf, 36 guns	27th Division; LG Maxim Fyodorovich Stavitzky	Brigade; Col Alexejev	Tarnopol IR	1 bn
Russian 11th Corps; GM Johann von Lieven; 8,000 inf, 36 guns	27th Division; LG Maxim Fyodorovich Stavitzky	Brigade; Col Kalogruivoff	49th Jager Regt	1 bn
Russian 11th Corps; GM Johann von Lieven; 8,000 inf, 36 guns	27th Division; LG Maxim Fyodorovich Stavitzky	Brigade; Col Kalogruivoff	50th Jager Regt	1 bn
Russian 11th Corps; GM Johann von Lieven; 8,000 inf, 36 guns	11th Corps Artillery	Not brigaded	Position Battery Nr. 18	12 x 12-pdr
Russian 11th Corps; GM Johann von Lieven; 8,000 inf, 36 guns	11th Corps Artillery	Not brigaded	Light Battery Nr. 34	12 x 6-pdr
Russian 11th Corps; GM Johann von Lieven; 8,000 inf, 36 guns	11th Corps Artillery	Not brigaded	Light Battery Nr. 35	12 x 6-pdr
Russian 6th Corps; GL Aleksei Scherbatov; 8,000 inf, 36 guns	7th Division; GM Alexander Ivanovich Tallisin	Brigade; Col Kritschinikov	Pskof IR	1 bn
Russian 6th Corps; GL Aleksei Scherbatov; 8,000 inf, 36 guns	7th Division; GM Alexander Ivanovich Tallisin	Brigade; Col Kritschinikov	Moscow IR	1 bn
Russian 6th Corps; GL Aleksei Scherbatov; 8,000 inf, 36 guns	7th Division; GM Alexander Ivanovich Tallisin	Brigade; Col Augustov	Sophia IR	1 bn
Russian 6th Corps; GL Aleksei Scherbatov; 8,000 inf, 36 guns	7th Division; GM Alexander Ivanovich Tallisin	Brigade; Col Augustov	Libau IR	1 bn
Russian 6th Corps; GL Aleksei Scherbatov; 8,000 inf, 36 guns	7th Division; GM Alexander Ivanovich Tallisin	Brigade; Col Dieterich	11th Jager Regt	1 bn
Russian 6th Corps; GL Aleksei Scherbatov; 8,000 inf, 36 guns	7th Division; GM Alexander Ivanovich Tallisin	Brigade; Col Dieterich	36th Jager Regt	1 bn
Russian 6th Corps; GL Aleksei Scherbatov; 8,000 inf, 36 guns	18th Division; GM Bernodessov	Brigade; LC Blagovenzenko	Vladimir IR	1 bn
Russian 6th Corps; GL Aleksei Scherbatov; 8,000 inf, 36 guns	18th Division; GM Bernodessov	Brigade; LC Blagovenzenko	Dneiper IR	1 bn
Russian 6th Corps; GL Aleksei Scherbatov; 8,000 inf, 36 guns	18th Division; GM Bernodessov	Brigade; GM Heidenreich	Tambov IR	1 bn
Russian 6th Corps; GL Aleksei Scherbatov; 8,000 inf, 36 guns	18th Division; GM Bernodessov	Brigade; GM Heidenreich	Kostroma IR	1 bn
Russian 6th Corps; GL Aleksei Scherbatov; 8,000 inf, 36 guns	18th Division; GM Bernodessov	Brigade; GM Metcherinov	28th Jager Regt	1 bn
Russian 6th Corps; GL Aleksei Scherbatov; 8,000 inf, 36 guns	18th Division; GM Bernodessov	Brigade; GM Metcherinov	32nd Jager Regt	1 bn
Russian 6th Corps; GL Aleksei Scherbatov; 8,000 inf, 36 guns	6th Corps Artillery	Not brigaded	Position Battery Nr. 10	12 x 12-pdr
Russian 6th Corps; GL Aleksei Scherbatov; 8,000 inf, 36 guns	6th Corps Artillery	Not brigaded	Light Battery Nr. 19	12 x 6-pdr
Russian 6th Corps; GL Aleksei Scherbatov; 8,000 inf, 36 guns	6th Corps Artillery	Not brigaded	Light Battery Nr. 24	12 x 6-pdr
Russian 9th Corps; GL Zakhar Dmitrievich Olsufiev; 5,000 inf, 36 guns	9th Division; GM Evstafy Evstafyevich Udom	Brigade; GM Konstantin Poltoratsky	Nacheburg IR	1 bn, 563
Russian 9th Corps; GL Zakhar Dmitrievich Olsufiev; 5,000 inf, 36 guns	9th Division; GM Evstafy Evstafyevich Udom	Brigade; GM Konstantin Poltoratsky	Apcheron IR	1 bn, 486
Russian 9th Corps; GL Zakhar Dmitrievich Olsufiev; 5,000 inf, 36 guns	9th Division; GM Evstafy Evstafyevich Udom	Brigade; GM Sergei Nikolaevich Uschakov (Juschkov II?)	Riajsk IR	1 bn, 620
Russian 9th Corps; GL Zakhar Dmitrievich Olsufiev; 5,000 inf, 36 guns	9th Division; GM Evstafy Evstafyevich Udom	Brigade; GM Sergei Nikolaevich Uschakov (Juschkov II?)	Iakout IR	1 bn, 533
Russian 9th Corps; GL Zakhar Dmitrievich Olsufiev; 5,000 inf, 36 guns	9th Division; GM Evstafy Evstafyevich Udom	Brigade; Maj Melnik	10th Jager Regt	1 bn, 335
Russian 9th Corps; GL Zakhar Dmitrievich Olsufiev; 5,000 inf, 36 guns	9th Division; GM Evstafy Evstafyevich Udom	Brigade; Maj Melnik	38th Jager Regt	1 bn, 472
Russian 9th Corps; GL Zakhar Dmitrievich Olsufiev; 5,000 inf, 36 guns	15th Division; GM Peter Yakovlevich Kornilov	Brigade; LC Anensur	Kolyvan IR	417
Russian 9th Corps; GL Zakhar Dmitrievich Olsufiev; 5,000 inf, 36 guns	15th Division; GM Peter Yakovlevich Kornilov	Brigade; LC Anensur	Kourin IR	417
Russian 9th Corps; GL Zakhar Dmitrievich Olsufiev; 5,000 inf, 36 guns	15th Division; GM Peter Yakovlevich Kornilov	Brigade; GM Mussin-Pushkin	Vitebsk IR	372
Russian 9th Corps; GL Zakhar Dmitrievich Olsufiev; 5,000 inf, 36 guns	15th Division; GM Peter Yakovlevich Kornilov	Brigade; GM Mussin-Pushkin	Kozlov IR	504
Russian 9th Corps; GL Zakhar Dmitrievich Olsufiev; 5,000 inf, 36 guns	15th Division; GM Peter Yakovlevich Kornilov	Brigade; Col Tuchanowsky	12th Jager Regt	1 bn, 447
Russian 9th Corps; GL Zakhar Dmitrievich Olsufiev; 5,000 inf, 36 guns	15th Division; GM Peter Yakovlevich Kornilov	Brigade; Col Tuchanowsky	22nd Jager Regt	1 bn, -
Russian 9th Corps; GL Zakhar Dmitrievich Olsufiev; 5,000 inf, 36 guns	9th Corps Artillery	Not brigaded	Position Battery Nr. 15	12 x 12-pdr
Russian 9th Corps; GL Zakhar Dmitrievich Olsufiev; 5,000 inf, 36 guns	9th Corps Artillery	Not brigaded	Light Battery Nr. 13	12 x 6-pdr
Russian 9th Corps; GL Zakhar Dmitrievich Olsufiev; 5,000 inf, 36 guns	9th Corps Artillery	Not brigaded	Light Battery Nr. 29	12 x 6-pdr
Cavalry Corps; GL Ilarion Vasilievich Vasilshikov; 3,000 cav 3,000 Cossack cav 1,500 Prussian cav	2nd Hussar Division; GM Sergey Nikolaevich Lanskoy	Brigade; GM Ivan Mihailovich Vodbolsky	Akhtyrsk Hussar Regt	6 sqns
Cavalry Corps; GL Ilarion Vasilievich Vasilshikov; 3,000 cav 3,000 Cossack cav 1,500 Prussian cav	2nd Hussar Division; GM Sergey Nikolaevich Lanskoy	Brigade; GM Ivan Mihailovich Vodbolsky	Marioupol Hussar Regt	5 sqns
Cavalry Corps; GL Ilarion Vasilievich Vasilshikov; 3,000 cav 3,000 Cossack cav 1,500 Prussian cav	2nd Hussar Division; GM Sergey Nikolaevich Lanskoy	Brigade; Col Vasilshikov	White Russia Hussar Regt	4 sqns
Cavalry Corps; GL Ilarion Vasilievich Vasilshikov; 3,000 cav 3,000 Cossack cav 1,500 Prussian cav	2nd Hussar Division; GM Sergey Nikolaevich Lanskoy	Brigade; Col Vasilshikov	Alexandria Hussar Regt	5 sqns
Cavalry Corps; GL Ilarion Vasilievich Vasilshikov; 3,000 cav 3,000 Cossack cav 1,500 Prussian cav	3rd Dragoon Division; GM Ivan Davydovich Panschulichev	Brigade; GM Pavel Nikolaevich Uschakov	Smolensk Dragoon Regt	-
Cavalry Corps; GL Ilarion Vasilievich Vasilshikov; 3,000 cav 3,000 Cossack cav 1,500 Prussian cav	3rd Dragoon Division; GM Ivan Davydovich Panschulichev	Brigade; GM Pavel Nikolaevich Uschakov	Kurland Dragoon Regt	-
Cavalry Corps; GL Ilarion Vasilievich Vasilshikov; 3,000 cav 3,000 Cossack cav 1,500 Prussian cav	3rd Dragoon Division; GM Ivan Davydovich Panschulichev	Brigade; GM Andrei Semyonovich Umanets	Tver Dragoon Regt	-
Cavalry Corps; GL Ilarion Vasilievich Vasilshikov; 3,000 cav 3,000 Cossack cav 1,500 Prussian cav	3rd Dragoon Division; GM Ivan Davydovich Panschulichev	Brigade; GM Andrei Semyonovich Umanets	Kinburn Dragoon Regt	-
Cavalry Corps; GL Ilarion Vasilievich Vasilshikov; 3,000 cav 3,000 Cossack cav 1,500 Prussian cav	3rd Dragoon Division; GM Ivan Davydovich Panschulichev	Brigade; GM Andrei Semyonovich Umanets	Horse Battery Nr. 18	12 x 6-pdr
Cavalry Corps; GL Ilarion Vasilievich Vasilshikov; 3,000 cav 3,000 Cossack cav 1,500 Prussian cav	Cossacks; GM Akim Akimovich Karpov; 3,000 cav	Not brigaded	Karpov II Don Cossack Regt	-
Cavalry Corps; GL Ilarion Vasilievich Vasilshikov; 3,000 cav 3,000 Cossack cav 1,500 Prussian cav	Cossacks; GM Akim Akimovich Karpov; 3,000 cav	Not brigaded	Semintshikov IV Don Cossack Regt	-
Cavalry Corps; GL Ilarion Vasilievich Vasilshikov; 3,000 cav 3,000 Cossack cav 1,500 Prussian cav	Cossacks; GM Akim Akimovich Karpov; 3,000 cav	Not brigaded	Lukowken II Don Cossack Regt	-
Cavalry Corps; GL Ilarion Vasilievich Vasilshikov; 3,000 cav 3,000 Cossack cav 1,500 Prussian cav	Cossacks; GM Akim Akimovich Karpov; 3,000 cav	Not brigaded	Kuteinikov IV Don Cossack Regt	-
Cavalry Corps; GL Ilarion Vasilievich Vasilshikov; 3,000 cav 3,000 Cossack cav 1,500 Prussian cav	Cossacks; GM Akim Akimovich Karpov; 3,000 cav	Not brigaded	Grekov I Don Cossack Regt	-
Cavalry Corps; GL Ilarion Vasilievich Vasilshikov; 3,000 cav 3,000 Cossack cav 1,500 Prussian cav	Cossacks; GM Akim Akimovich Karpov; 3,000 cav	Not brigaded	St. Petersburg Cossack Regt	-
Cavalry Corps; GL Ilarion Vasilievich Vasilshikov; 3,000 cav 3,000 Cossack cav 1,500 Prussian cav	Cossacks; GM Akim Akimovich Karpov; 3,000 cav	Not brigaded	4th Ukraine Cossack Regt	-
Cavalry Corps; GL Ilarion Vasilievich Vasilshikov; 3,000 cav 3,000 Cossack cav 1,500 Prussian cav	Cossacks; GM Akim Akimovich Karpov; 3,000 cav	Not brigaded	2nd Kalmuck Cossack Regt	-
Cavalry Corps; GL Ilarion Vasilievich Vasilshikov; 3,000 cav 3,000 Cossack cav 1,500 Prussian cav	Prussian Detachment; 1,500 cav	Prussian Cavalry Brigade; GM Prince Biron of Courland	2nd Silesian Hussar Regt	2 sqns
Cavalry Corps; GL Ilarion Vasilievich Vasilshikov; 3,000 cav 3,000 Cossack cav 1,500 Prussian cav	Prussian Detachment; 1,500 cav	Prussian Cavalry Brigade; GM Prince Biron of Courland	Silesian National Cavalry Regt	2 sqns
Cavalry Corps; GL Ilarion Vasilievich Vasilshikov; 3,000 cav 3,000 Cossack cav 1,500 Prussian cav	Prussian Detachment; 1,500 cav	Prussian Cavalry Brigade; GM Prince Biron of Courland	Neumark Dragoon Regt	1 sqn
Cavalry Corps; GL Ilarion Vasilievich Vasilshikov; 3,000 cav 3,000 Cossack cav 1,500 Prussian cav	Prussian Detachment; 1,500 cav	Prussian Cavalry Brigade; GM Prince Biron of Courland	Cossack detachment	-
Army Corps Artillery; GM Alexei Petrovich Nikitin; 108 guns	Not subdivided	Not brigaded	Horse Battery Nr. 6	12 x 6-pdr
Army Corps Artillery; GM Alexei Petrovich Nikitin; 108 guns	Not subdivided	Not brigaded	Horse Battery Nr. 7	12 x 6-pdr
Army Corps Artillery; GM Alexei Petrovich Nikitin; 108 guns	Not subdivided	Not brigaded	Position Battery Nr. 10	12 x 12-pdr
Army Corps Artillery; GM Alexei Petrovich Nikitin; 108 guns	Not subdivided	Not brigaded	Position Battery Nr. 13	12 x 12-pdr
Army Corps Artillery; GM Alexei Petrovich Nikitin; 108 guns	Not subdivided	Not brigaded	Position Battery Nr. 18	12 x 12-pdr
Army Corps Artillery; GM Alexei Petrovich Nikitin; 108 guns	Not subdivided	Not brigaded	Light Battery Nr. 24	12 x 6-pdr
Army Corps Artillery; GM Alexei Petrovich Nikitin; 108 guns	Not subdivided	Not brigaded	Light Battery Nr. 28	12 x 6-pdr
Army Corps Artillery; GM Alexei Petrovich Nikitin; 108 guns	Not subdivided	Not brigaded	Light Battery Nr. 34	12 x 6-pdr
Army Corps Artillery; GM Alexei Petrovich Nikitin; 108 guns	Not subdivided	Not brigaded	Light Battery Nr. 35	12 x 6-pdr
Army Corps Artillery; GM Alexei Petrovich Nikitin; 108 guns	Not subdivided	Not brigaded	Pioneer Company	-

=== Right Wing ===
- Field Marshal Prince William I of Württemberg

- Chief of Staff: FZM Frederic von Franquemont

The Coalition 4th Corps was made up entirely of Kingdom of Württemberg units.

Coalition Right Wing - 1 February 1814
Corps	Division	Brigade	Unit	Strength
4th Corps; Prince of Württemberg; 12,000 inf, 2,500 cav, 24 guns	Cavalry Division; GL Duke Adam of Württemberg	Brigade; GM von Alvensleben	Duke Louis Horse Chasseur Regt Nr. 2	4 sqns
4th Corps; Prince of Württemberg; 12,000 inf, 2,500 cav, 24 guns	Cavalry Division; GL Duke Adam of Württemberg	Brigade; GM von Alvensleben	Crown Prince Dragoon Regt; Nr. 3	4 sqns
4th Corps; Prince of Württemberg; 12,000 inf, 2,500 cav, 24 guns	Cavalry Division; GL Duke Adam of Württemberg	Brigade; GM von Alvensleben	1st Horse Art Battery	4 x 6-pdr, 2 x how
4th Corps; Prince of Württemberg; 12,000 inf, 2,500 cav, 24 guns	Cavalry Division; GL Duke Adam of Württemberg	Brigade; GM Carl August von Jett	Prince Adam Horse Chasseur Regt Nr. 4	4 sqns
4th Corps; Prince of Württemberg; 12,000 inf, 2,500 cav, 24 guns	Cavalry Division; GL Duke Adam of Württemberg	Brigade; GM Carl August von Jett	2nd Horse Art Battery	4 x 6-pdr, 2 x how
4th Corps; Prince of Württemberg; 12,000 inf, 2,500 cav, 24 guns	Infantry Division; GL Christian Johann Gottgetreu von Koch	Brigade; GM Lüdwig von Stockmayer	König Jäger Regt Nr. 9	2 bns
4th Corps; Prince of Württemberg; 12,000 inf, 2,500 cav, 24 guns	Infantry Division; GL Christian Johann Gottgetreu von Koch	Brigade; GM Lüdwig von Stockmayer	Light IR Nr. 10	1 bn
4th Corps; Prince of Württemberg; 12,000 inf, 2,500 cav, 24 guns	Infantry Division; GL Christian Johann Gottgetreu von Koch	Brigade; GM Christoph Friedrich Döring	Duke Wilhelm Line IR Nr. 2	2 bns
4th Corps; Prince of Württemberg; 12,000 inf, 2,500 cav, 24 guns	Infantry Division; GL Christian Johann Gottgetreu von Koch	Brigade; GM Christoph Friedrich Döring	Line IR Nr. 3	2 bns
4th Corps; Prince of Württemberg; 12,000 inf, 2,500 cav, 24 guns	Infantry Division; GL Christian Johann Gottgetreu von Koch	Brigade; GM Christoph Friedrich Döring	Line IR Nr. 7	2 bns
4th Corps; Prince of Württemberg; 12,000 inf, 2,500 cav, 24 guns	Infantry Division; GL Christian Johann Gottgetreu von Koch	Brigade; GM Christoph Friedrich Döring	1st Foot Art Battery	4 x 6-pdr, 2 x how
4th Corps; Prince of Württemberg; 12,000 inf, 2,500 cav, 24 guns	Infantry Division; GL Christian Johann Gottgetreu von Koch	Brigade; GM Prince Karl von Hohenlohe-Kirchberg	Line IR Nr. 4	2 bns
4th Corps; Prince of Württemberg; 12,000 inf, 2,500 cav, 24 guns	Infantry Division; GL Christian Johann Gottgetreu von Koch	Brigade; GM Prince Karl von Hohenlohe-Kirchberg	Line IR Nr. 6	2 bns
4th Corps; Prince of Württemberg; 12,000 inf, 2,500 cav, 24 guns	Infantry Division; GL Christian Johann Gottgetreu von Koch	Brigade; GM Prince Karl von Hohenlohe-Kirchberg	2nd Foot Art Battery	4 x 6-pdr, 2 x how

=== Extreme Right Wing ===
- General of Infantry Karl Philipp von Wrede

The Coalition 5th Corps was made up of both Bavarian and Austrian units.

Coalition Extreme Right Wing - 1 February 1814
Corps	Division	Brigade	Unit	Strength
5th Corps; General Karl Philipp von Wrede; 18,000 inf, 3,600 cav, 66 guns	Austrian 1st Division; FML Ignaz Count Hardegg	OB Leopold von Geramb	Archduke Joseph Hussar Regt Nr. 2	6 sqns
5th Corps; General Karl Philipp von Wrede; 18,000 inf, 3,600 cav, 66 guns	Austrian 1st Division; FML Ignaz Count Hardegg	OB Leopold von Geramb	1st Szekler Grenz IR Nr. 14	2 bns
5th Corps; General Karl Philipp von Wrede; 18,000 inf, 3,600 cav, 66 guns	Austrian 1st Division; FML Ignaz Count Hardegg	OB Leopold von Geramb	Cavalry Battery	6 x 6-pdr
5th Corps; General Karl Philipp von Wrede; 18,000 inf, 3,600 cav, 66 guns	Austrian 1st Division; FML Ignaz Count Hardegg	Brigade; OB von Mengen	Schwarzenberg Uhlan Regt; Nr. 2	6 sqns
5th Corps; General Karl Philipp von Wrede; 18,000 inf, 3,600 cav, 66 guns	Austrian 1st Division; FML Ignaz Count Hardegg	Brigade; OB von Mengen	3rd Jäger Battalion	1 bn
5th Corps; General Karl Philipp von Wrede; 18,000 inf, 3,600 cav, 66 guns	Austrian 2nd Division; FML Ignaz von Splényi	Brigade; Unknown	Jordis IR Nr. 59	4 bns
5th Corps; General Karl Philipp von Wrede; 18,000 inf, 3,600 cav, 66 guns	Austrian 2nd Division; FML Ignaz von Splényi	Brigade; Unknown	Archduke Rudolf IR Nr. 14	4 bns
5th Corps; General Karl Philipp von Wrede; 18,000 inf, 3,600 cav, 66 guns	Austrian 2nd Division; FML Ignaz von Splényi	Brigade; GM Friedrich von Minutillo	Szekler Hussar Regt Nr. 11	6 sqns
5th Corps; General Karl Philipp von Wrede; 18,000 inf, 3,600 cav, 66 guns	Austrian 2nd Division; FML Ignaz von Splényi	Brigade; GM Friedrich von Minutillo	Knesevich Dragoon Regt Nr. 3	6 sqns
5th Corps; General Karl Philipp von Wrede; 18,000 inf, 3,600 cav, 66 guns	Austrian 2nd Division; FML Ignaz von Splényi	Brigade; GM Friedrich von Minutillo	Cavalry Battery	6 x 6-pdr
5th Corps; General Karl Philipp von Wrede; 18,000 inf, 3,600 cav, 66 guns	Austrian Artillery Reserve	Brigade; GM August von Stwrtnik	12-pdr Position Battery	6 x 12-pdr
5th Corps; General Karl Philipp von Wrede; 18,000 inf, 3,600 cav, 66 guns	Austrian Artillery Reserve	Brigade; GM August von Stwrtnik	6-pdr Position Battery	6 x 6-pdr
5th Corps; General Karl Philipp von Wrede; 18,000 inf, 3,600 cav, 66 guns	1st Bavarian Division; GL Anton von Rechberg	Brigade; GM Prince Karl Theodor of Bavaria	1st Bavarian IR	2 bns
5th Corps; General Karl Philipp von Wrede; 18,000 inf, 3,600 cav, 66 guns	1st Bavarian Division; GL Anton von Rechberg	Brigade; GM Prince Karl Theodor of Bavaria	3rd Bavarian IR	1 bn
5th Corps; General Karl Philipp von Wrede; 18,000 inf, 3,600 cav, 66 guns	1st Bavarian Division; GL Anton von Rechberg	Brigade; GM Prince Karl Theodor of Bavaria	Oberdonau LW Regt	1st Bn
5th Corps; General Karl Philipp von Wrede; 18,000 inf, 3,600 cav, 66 guns	1st Bavarian Division; GL Anton von Rechberg	Brigade; GM Prince Karl Theodor of Bavaria	3rd Light Inf Bn	1 bn
5th Corps; General Karl Philipp von Wrede; 18,000 inf, 3,600 cav, 66 guns	1st Bavarian Division; GL Anton von Rechberg	Brigade; GM Nikolaus von Maillot de la Treille	1st Bavarian IR	1 bn
5th Corps; General Karl Philipp von Wrede; 18,000 inf, 3,600 cav, 66 guns	1st Bavarian Division; GL Anton von Rechberg	Brigade; GM Nikolaus von Maillot de la Treille	2nd Bavarian IR	1 bn
5th Corps; General Karl Philipp von Wrede; 18,000 inf, 3,600 cav, 66 guns	1st Bavarian Division; GL Anton von Rechberg	Brigade; GM Nikolaus von Maillot de la Treille	Oberdonau LW Regt	2nd Bn
5th Corps; General Karl Philipp von Wrede; 18,000 inf, 3,600 cav, 66 guns	1st Bavarian Division; GL Anton von Rechberg	Brigade; GM Nikolaus von Maillot de la Treille	2nd Light Inf Bn	1 bn
5th Corps; General Karl Philipp von Wrede; 18,000 inf, 3,600 cav, 66 guns	1st Bavarian Division; GL Anton von Rechberg	1st Light Cavalry Brigade; GM Anton von Vieregg	1st Bavarian Chevau-léger Regt	4 sqns
5th Corps; General Karl Philipp von Wrede; 18,000 inf, 3,600 cav, 66 guns	1st Bavarian Division; GL Anton von Rechberg	1st Light Cavalry Brigade; GM Anton von Vieregg	2nd Bavarian Chevau-léger Regt	4 sqns
5th Corps; General Karl Philipp von Wrede; 18,000 inf, 3,600 cav, 66 guns	1st Bavarian Division; GL Anton von Rechberg	1st Light Cavalry Brigade; GM Anton von Vieregg	7th Bavarian Chevau-léger Regt	4 sqns
5th Corps; General Karl Philipp von Wrede; 18,000 inf, 3,600 cav, 66 guns	1st Bavarian Division; GL Anton von Rechberg	Artillery	Cavalry Battery	6 x 6-pdr
5th Corps; General Karl Philipp von Wrede; 18,000 inf, 3,600 cav, 66 guns	1st Bavarian Division; GL Anton von Rechberg	Artillery	Light Battery	8 x 6-pdr
5th Corps; General Karl Philipp von Wrede; 18,000 inf, 3,600 cav, 66 guns	2nd Bavarian Division; GL Karl August von Beckers zu Westerstetten	Brigade; GM Karl Theodor von Pappenheim	4th Bavarian IR	2 bns
5th Corps; General Karl Philipp von Wrede; 18,000 inf, 3,600 cav, 66 guns	2nd Bavarian Division; GL Karl August von Beckers zu Westerstetten	Brigade; GM Karl Theodor von Pappenheim	Salzach LW Regt	1 bn
5th Corps; General Karl Philipp von Wrede; 18,000 inf, 3,600 cav, 66 guns	2nd Bavarian Division; GL Karl August von Beckers zu Westerstetten	Brigade; GM Karl Theodor von Pappenheim	Regen LW Regt	1st Bn
5th Corps; General Karl Philipp von Wrede; 18,000 inf, 3,600 cav, 66 guns	2nd Bavarian Division; GL Karl August von Beckers zu Westerstetten	Brigade; GM Karl Theodor von Pappenheim	4th Light Inf Bn	1 bn
5th Corps; General Karl Philipp von Wrede; 18,000 inf, 3,600 cav, 66 guns	2nd Bavarian Division; GL Karl August von Beckers zu Westerstetten	Brigade; GM Friedrich, Freiherr von Zoller	6th Bavarian IR	2 bns
5th Corps; General Karl Philipp von Wrede; 18,000 inf, 3,600 cav, 66 guns	2nd Bavarian Division; GL Karl August von Beckers zu Westerstetten	Brigade; GM Friedrich, Freiherr von Zoller	Rezat LW Regt	1st Bn
5th Corps; General Karl Philipp von Wrede; 18,000 inf, 3,600 cav, 66 guns	2nd Bavarian Division; GL Karl August von Beckers zu Westerstetten	Brigade; GM Friedrich, Freiherr von Zoller	1st Light Inf Bn	1 bn
5th Corps; General Karl Philipp von Wrede; 18,000 inf, 3,600 cav, 66 guns	2nd Bavarian Division; GL Karl August von Beckers zu Westerstetten	2nd Light Cavalry Brigade; GM Franz von Elbracht	3rd Bavarian Chevau-léger Regt	4 sqns
5th Corps; General Karl Philipp von Wrede; 18,000 inf, 3,600 cav, 66 guns	2nd Bavarian Division; GL Karl August von Beckers zu Westerstetten	2nd Light Cavalry Brigade; GM Franz von Elbracht	6th Bavarian Chevau-léger Regt	4 sqns
5th Corps; General Karl Philipp von Wrede; 18,000 inf, 3,600 cav, 66 guns	2nd Bavarian Division; GL Karl August von Beckers zu Westerstetten	Artillery	Cavalry Battery	6 x 6-pdr
5th Corps; General Karl Philipp von Wrede; 18,000 inf, 3,600 cav, 66 guns	2nd Bavarian Division; GL Karl August von Beckers zu Westerstetten	Artillery	Light Battery	8 x 6-pdr
5th Corps; General Karl Philipp von Wrede; 18,000 inf, 3,600 cav, 66 guns	3rd Bavarian Division; GL Peter von Lamotte	Brigade; GM Georg von Habermann	11th Bavarian IR	2 bns
5th Corps; General Karl Philipp von Wrede; 18,000 inf, 3,600 cav, 66 guns	3rd Bavarian Division; GL Peter von Lamotte	Brigade; GM Georg von Habermann	7th Bavarian IR	1 bn
5th Corps; General Karl Philipp von Wrede; 18,000 inf, 3,600 cav, 66 guns	3rd Bavarian Division; GL Peter von Lamotte	Brigade; GM Georg von Habermann	Unterdonau LW Regt	1st Bn
5th Corps; General Karl Philipp von Wrede; 18,000 inf, 3,600 cav, 66 guns	3rd Bavarian Division; GL Peter von Lamotte	Brigade; GM Georg von Habermann	Iller LW Regt	1st bn
5th Corps; General Karl Philipp von Wrede; 18,000 inf, 3,600 cav, 66 guns	3rd Bavarian Division; GL Peter von Lamotte	Brigade; GM Franz Xaver Ferdinand von Deroy	5th Bavarian IR	1 bn
5th Corps; General Karl Philipp von Wrede; 18,000 inf, 3,600 cav, 66 guns	3rd Bavarian Division; GL Peter von Lamotte	Brigade; GM Franz Xaver Ferdinand von Deroy	8th Bavarian IR	1 bn
5th Corps; General Karl Philipp von Wrede; 18,000 inf, 3,600 cav, 66 guns	3rd Bavarian Division; GL Peter von Lamotte	Brigade; GM Franz Xaver Ferdinand von Deroy	9th Bavarian IR	1 bn
5th Corps; General Karl Philipp von Wrede; 18,000 inf, 3,600 cav, 66 guns	3rd Bavarian Division; GL Peter von Lamotte	Brigade; GM Franz Xaver Ferdinand von Deroy	Iller LW Regt	2nd Bn
5th Corps; General Karl Philipp von Wrede; 18,000 inf, 3,600 cav, 66 guns	3rd Bavarian Division; GL Peter von Lamotte	Brigade; GM Franz Xaver Ferdinand von Deroy	Isar LW Bn	1st bn
5th Corps; General Karl Philipp von Wrede; 18,000 inf, 3,600 cav, 66 guns	3rd Bavarian Division; GL Peter von Lamotte	3rd Light Cavalry Brigade; GM von Elbracht (?)	4th Bavarian Chevau-léger Regt	4 sqns
5th Corps; General Karl Philipp von Wrede; 18,000 inf, 3,600 cav, 66 guns	3rd Bavarian Division; GL Peter von Lamotte	3rd Light Cavalry Brigade; GM von Elbracht (?)	5th Bavarian Chevau-léger Regt	4 sqns
5th Corps; General Karl Philipp von Wrede; 18,000 inf, 3,600 cav, 66 guns	3rd Bavarian Division; GL Peter von Lamotte	Artillery	Cavalry Battery	6 x 6-pdr
5th Corps; General Karl Philipp von Wrede; 18,000 inf, 3,600 cav, 66 guns	3rd Bavarian Division; GL Peter von Lamotte	Artillery	Light Battery	8 x 6-pdr
5th Corps; General Karl Philipp von Wrede; 18,000 inf, 3,600 cav, 66 guns	Corps Artillery Reserve	Not brigaded	Heavy Battery	6 x 12-pdr
5th Corps; General Karl Philipp von Wrede; 18,000 inf, 3,600 cav, 66 guns	Corps Artillery Reserve	Not brigaded	Heavy Battery	6 x 12-pdr
5th Corps; General Karl Philipp von Wrede; 18,000 inf, 3,600 cav, 66 guns	Corps Artillery Reserve	Not brigaded	Heavy Battery	6 x 12-pdr
5th Corps; General Karl Philipp von Wrede; 18,000 inf, 3,600 cav, 66 guns	Corps Artillery Reserve	Not brigaded	Heavy Battery	6 x 12-pdr

=== Reserves ===
- General Michael Andreas Barclay de Tolly

Coalition Reserves - 1 February 1814
Corps	Division	Brigade	Unit	Strength
Reserve Cavalry; GL Prince Dmitry Golitsyn; 4,000 (Note: On 1 January 1814, the Reserve Cavalry numbered 8,409 horsemen in one Guard and three cuirassier divisions, while the Prussian Guard cavalry numbered 1,263 (Nafziger, p. 561–562). On 1 February 1814, the Reserve Cavalry was counted as 4,000 and the Guards Cavalry, including the Prussians, as 4,800. It is assumed that the 1st Cuirassier Division was a Guard formation, since it included the Chevalier and Horse Guard Regiments. This suggests that the 4,000 cavalry in Nafziger's order of battle referred only to the 2nd and 3rd Cuirassier Divisions (Nafziger, pp. 590–591). Petre wrote that two divisions of cuirassiers and two divisions of grenadiers were assigned as reserves, but that the Guard formations were held back (Petre, p. 28–30). Because of a blunder one grenadier and two cuirassier divisions never came into action though they were on the field (Petre, p. 38).)	2nd Cuirassier Division; GL Nikolay Vasilyevich Kretov	Brigade; GM Ivan Sergeevich Leontyev	Gluchov Cuirassier Regt	5 sqns
Reserve Cavalry; GL Prince Dmitry Golitsyn; 4,000	2nd Cuirassier Division; GL Nikolay Vasilyevich Kretov	Brigade; GM Ivan Sergeevich Leontyev	Pskof Cuirassier Regt	5 sqns
Reserve Cavalry; GL Prince Dmitry Golitsyn; 4,000	2nd Cuirassier Division; GL Nikolay Vasilyevich Kretov	Brigade; GM Karatheff	Ekaterinoslav Cuirassier Regt	2 sqns
Reserve Cavalry; GL Prince Dmitry Golitsyn; 4,000	2nd Cuirassier Division; GL Nikolay Vasilyevich Kretov	Brigade; GM Karatheff	Astrakhan Regt	4 sqns
Reserve Cavalry; GL Prince Dmitry Golitsyn; 4,000	3rd Cuirassier Division; GL Ilya Michailovich Duka	Brigade; GM Alexey Andrianovich Protasov	Military Order Cuirassier Regt	5 sqns
Reserve Cavalry; GL Prince Dmitry Golitsyn; 4,000	3rd Cuirassier Division; GL Ilya Michailovich Duka	Brigade; GM Alexey Andrianovich Protasov	Little Russia Cuirassier Regt	4 sqns
Reserve Cavalry; GL Prince Dmitry Golitsyn; 4,000	3rd Cuirassier Division; GL Ilya Michailovich Duka	Brigade; GM Vasily V. Levashov	Novgorod Cuirassier Regt	4 sqns
Reserve Cavalry; GL Prince Dmitry Golitsyn; 4,000	3rd Cuirassier Division; GL Ilya Michailovich Duka	Brigade; GM Vasily V. Levashov	Starodoub Cuirassier Regt	5 sqns
Grenadier Corps; GL Nikolay Raevsky; 8,000 (Note: The 1 January 1814 order of battle was listed here because it followed Nafziger's description of the battle more closely by describing units of the 2nd Grenadier Division that were engaged (Nafziger, pp. 114–115, 562).)	1st Grenadier Division; GM Pavel Nikolaevich Choglokov	Brigade; GM Boris Yakovlevich Knyazhnin II	Arakcheyev Grenadier Regt	2 bns
Grenadier Corps; GL Nikolay Raevsky; 8,000	1st Grenadier Division; GM Pavel Nikolaevich Choglokov	Brigade; GM Boris Yakovlevich Knyazhnin II	Ekaterinoslav Grenadier Regt	2 bns
Grenadier Corps; GL Nikolay Raevsky; 8,000	1st Grenadier Division; GM Pavel Nikolaevich Choglokov	Brigade; Col Jemilianov	Tauride Grenadier Regt	1 bn
Grenadier Corps; GL Nikolay Raevsky; 8,000	1st Grenadier Division; GM Pavel Nikolaevich Choglokov	Brigade; Col Jemilianov	St Petersburg Grenadier Regt	2 bns
Grenadier Corps; GL Nikolay Raevsky; 8,000	1st Grenadier Division; GM Pavel Nikolaevich Choglokov	Brigade; Col Nikolay Semyonovich Sulima	Kexholm Grenadier Regt	2 bns
Grenadier Corps; GL Nikolay Raevsky; 8,000	1st Grenadier Division; GM Pavel Nikolaevich Choglokov	Brigade; Col Nikolay Semyonovich Sulima	Pernau Grenadier Regt	2 bns
Grenadier Corps; GL Nikolay Raevsky; 8,000	2nd Grenadier Division; GM Ivan Paskevich	Brigade; GM Alexandr Alexandrovich Pisarev	Kiev Grenadier Regt	2 bns
Grenadier Corps; GL Nikolay Raevsky; 8,000	2nd Grenadier Division; GM Ivan Paskevich	Brigade; GM Alexandr Alexandrovich Pisarev	Moscow Grenadier Regt	2 bns
Grenadier Corps; GL Nikolay Raevsky; 8,000	2nd Grenadier Division; GM Ivan Paskevich	Brigade; GM Damas	Astrakhan Grenadier Regt	1 bn
Grenadier Corps; GL Nikolay Raevsky; 8,000	2nd Grenadier Division; GM Ivan Paskevich	Brigade; GM Damas	Fangoria Grenadier Regt	1 bn
Grenadier Corps; GL Nikolay Raevsky; 8,000	2nd Grenadier Division; GM Ivan Paskevich	Brigade unknown commander	Siberia Grenadier Regt	2 bns
Grenadier Corps; GL Nikolay Raevsky; 8,000	2nd Grenadier Division; GM Ivan Paskevich	Brigade unknown commander	Little Russia Grenadier Regt	2 bns
Grenadier Corps; GL Nikolay Raevsky; 8,000	2nd Grenadier Division; GM Ivan Paskevich	Brigade unknown commander	Emperor Grenadier Regt	1 bn
Grenadier Corps; GL Nikolay Raevsky; 8,000	Corps Artillery; 32 guns (Note: The Nafziger order of battle listed 32 guns, which means that one battery was armed with 8 guns rather than the usual 12 guns (Nafziger, p. 563).)	not brigaded	Light Battery Nr. 2	12 x 6-pdr
Grenadier Corps; GL Nikolay Raevsky; 8,000	Corps Artillery; 32 guns	not brigaded	Heavy Battery Nr. 1	12 x 12-pdr
Grenadier Corps; GL Nikolay Raevsky; 8,000	Corps Artillery; 32 guns	not brigaded	Heavy Battery Nr. 30	12 x 12-pdr

== See also ==
- List of orders of battle

== Notes ==
Footnotes

Citations
