= Pierre Decouz =

French division commander

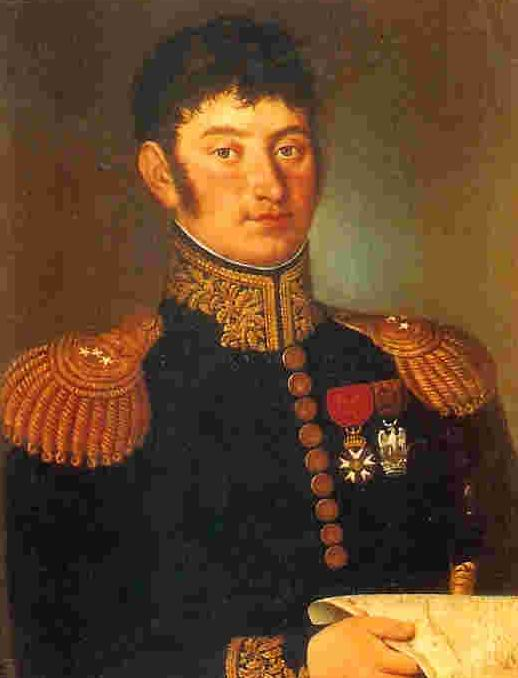
- Pierre Decouz
- Born: 18 July 1775; Annecy, Kingdom of Sardinia
- Died: 18 February 1814 (aged 38) Paris, France
- Allegiance: France
- Branch: Infantry
- Service years: (France) 1793–1814
- Rank: General of Division
- Conflicts: War of the First Coalition; Siege of Toulon; Battle of Loano; Battle of Mondovi; Battle of Castiglione; Siege of Mantua; French invasion of Egypt; Battle of the Pyramids; Siege of Acre; Battle of Abukir; War of the Third Coalition; Battle of Austerlitz; War of the Fourth Coalition; Battle of Auerstädt; Battle of Pultusk; Battle of Eylau; War of the Fifth Coalition; Battle of Eckmühl; Battle of Ratisbon; Battle of Wagram; War of the Sixth Coalition; Battle of Lützen; Battle of Bautzen; Battle of Dresden; Battle of Leipzig; Battle of Brienne †
- Awards: Légion d'Honneur, CC 1809
- Other work: Baron of the Empire, 1807

General of Division Baron Pierre Decouz (18 July 1775 – 18 February 1814) became a French division commander during the later Napoleonic Wars. He was born in the Kingdom of Sardinia but after the region was annexed to France, he joined a volunteer battalion in 1793. He fought in Italy during the War of the First Coalition. He participated in the French campaign in Egypt and Syria, fighting at the Pyramids, Acre and Abukir. After distinguishing himself at Austerlitz in 1805, he was promoted to command an infantry regiment. In 1806–1807 he led his regiment at Auerstädt, Pultusk and Eylau. In 1809 he fought at Eckmühl, Ratisbon and Wagram, winning promotion to general of brigade. After leading an Imperial Guard brigade at Lützen and Bautzen in 1813, he was promoted general of division. He commanded a Young Guard division at Dresden and Leipzig. Still leading a Young Guard division, he was fatally wounded at the Battle of Brienne and died three weeks later. His surname is one of the names inscribed under the Arc de Triomphe, on Column 17.

== Early career ==
Decouz was born on 18 July 1775 in Annecy in the Kingdom of Sardinia but after the Duchy of Savoy was annexed to France, he joined the Republican French army as a volunteer. In March 1793 he enrolled in the 2nd Battalion of the Volunteers of Mont Blanc and became a sous-lieutenant two months later. He fought at the Siege of Toulon later in the year. After its conclusion, he was posted to the 19th Infantry Demi-brigade of the Army of Italy. In 1795 the 19th fought at the Battle of Loano. In 1796, the 19th became the 69th Line Infantry Demi-brigade and the unit fought at the Battle of Mondovì, Battle of Castiglione and the Siege of Mantua.

Having been promoted to first lieutenant Decouz joined the staff of François Rambeaud in 1797. He participated in the French campaign in Egypt and Syria where he fought at the Battle of the Pyramids in 1798 and was promoted captain on the battlefield. He was promoted again to chef de bataillon during the Siege of Acre in 1799. He became aide-de-camp to Jean Lannes and distinguished himself at the Battle of Abukir. Lannes sent him on an important mission to the Pasha of Syria after which Decouz became an adjutant lieutenant colonel. He then transferred to Louis Friant's staff as aide-de-camp.

After his repatriation from Egypt, Decouz was appointed chief of staff of the 7th Military Division. At Grenoble he married a daughter of a former Paris justice of the peace.

== Empire ==
=== Regimental commander ===
In 1805 Decouz went to war as deputy chief of staff to Marshal Lannes. At the Battle of Austerlitz he had two horses killed under him and showed such valor that Emperor Napoleon appointed him colonel of the 21st Line Infantry Regiment. He assumed his new rank on 27 December 1805. His regiment was assigned to Charles-Étienne Gudin de La Sablonnière's division. The 21st Line fought at the Battle of Auerstädt on 14 October 1806. In this action, Marshal Louis Nicolas Davout's III Corps defeated the main Prussian army, inflicting 10,000 casualties and capturing at least 57 cannons. French losses were also severe: 7,000 men. Gudin's division was the first French division on the field at 7:00 am and fought alone until the second division arrived at 9:30 am.

Decouz led his regiment at the Battle of Pułtusk on 26 December 1806. The 21st Line also fought at the Battle of Eylau on 8 February 1807. He became a Baron of the Empire on 27 November 1807. In 1809, his regiment fought at the battles of Eckmühl, Ratisbon and Aspern-Essling. During the operations leading up to the Battle of Wagram, Decouz led the seizure of an island in the Danube River in which his men captured 600 Austrians, Colonel Saint-Julien and many artillery pieces. This feat earned him promotion to general of brigade on 12 July 1809 and the commander's cross of the Legion of Honor on 21 September 1809.

=== General officer ===
Decouz was transferred to Italy and entrusted by Marshal Joachim Murat with command of the port of Otranto. Later, Napoleon assigned him to watch over all ports of the Adriatic Sea. He was given command of the 3rd Brigade of the Army of Observation of Italy in 1811. About this time he was awarded the Order of the Iron Crown. Murat, the King of Naples wanted to be the godfather of Decouz's son but the general was recalled to France in October 1812. Napoleon appointed Decouz commander of the 1st Foot Chasseur Regiment of the Old Guard.

Decouz fought at the Battle of Lützen. In the Battle of Bautzen on 20–21 May 1813, Decouz was the only brigade commander in the 1st Old Guard Division, commanded by François Roguet. The division was made up of the 1st and 2nd Guard Foot Grenadier Regiments and the 1st and 2nd Guard Foot Chasseur Regiments, each including the 1st and 2nd Battalions, plus the Vélites of Turin and Florence. Late in the afternoon of 21 May, the divisions of the Imperial Guard launched an assault against the Allies' position.

On 4 August 1813 Decouz received promotion to general of division. In the Battle of Dresden on 26–27 August, Decouz led the 3rd Division of the Young Guard. Joseph Boyer de Rébeval's 1st Brigade included the 4th, 5th and 8th Voltigeur Regiments and Jean-Jacques Germain Pelet-Clozeau's 2nd Brigade was made up of the 9th and 10th Voltigeur Regiments. Each regiment consisted of two battalions. At 5:30 pm on the first day, Napoleon sent in the Young Guard divisions and they retook all the ground captured by the Allied attacks. During the night, Napoleon shifted the Young Guard from the center to the left flank where they pushed back the Allied right wing on the second day.

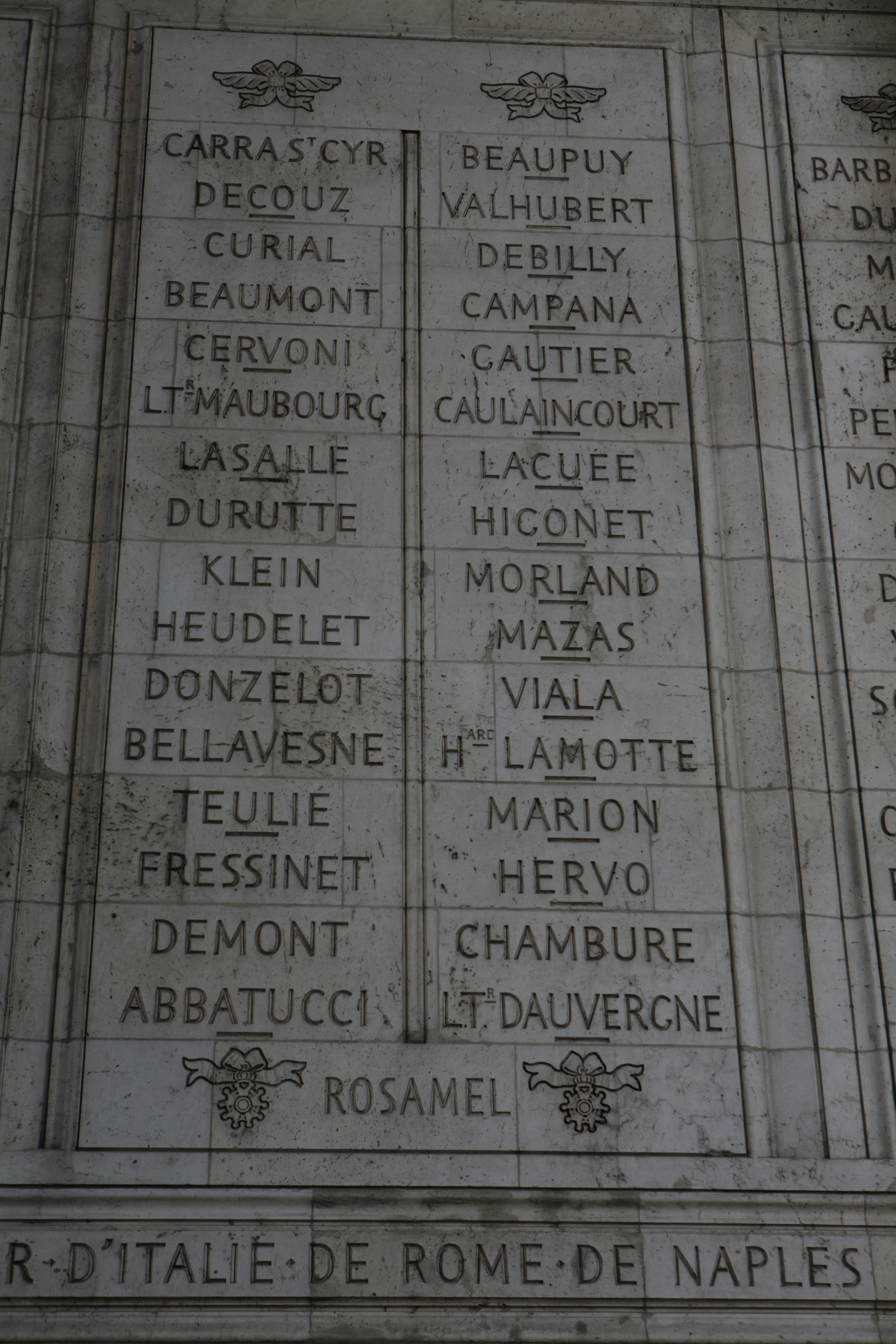
Decouz is the second name in Column 17.

At the Battle of Leipzig on 16–19 October 1813, Decouz led the 3rd Division in the I Young Guard Corps under Marshal Nicolas Oudinot. The 4,731-man division consisted of the 1st and 2nd Battalions of the 5th, 6th, 7th, 8th, 9th and 10th Voltigeur Regiments and the 1st Battalion of the 12th Voltigeurs. Boyer de Rébeval's 1st Brigade included the 5th, 6th and 7th Regiments while Pelet's 2nd Brigade was made up of the remaining infantry units. The 9th, 11th and 13th Young Guard Foot Artillery Companies and the 1st Battalion of the 2nd Guard Train Regiment were attached to the division. Each of the three artillery batteries had six 6-pounder System Year XI cannons and two 5 ½-inch howitzers. At 2:00 pm on 16 October, Napoleon ordered a general attack and Oudinot's corps rolled south from Wachau toward Anenhayn. Though the Allies were pressed back, the hoped-for decisive victory eluded Napoleon. Under the direction of Oudinot he led the army's rearguard, fighting against Jean Baptiste Bernadotte's Swedes.

Decouz's 2nd Young Guard Division with a strength of 2,840 men arrived at Nancy on 10 January 1814 and joined Marshal Auguste de Marmont's corps at Metz a few days later. By 18 January, the division had retreated to Verdun and on 24 January the troops were marching through Bar-le-Duc. On 25 January at Châlons-sur-Marne, Decouz's division included the 1st Brigade of Pelet and the 2nd Brigade of Auguste Julien Bigarré. Pelet's 1,313-man brigade was made up of the 5th and 6th Voltigeur Regiments while Bigarre's 1,387-man brigade consisted of the 7th and 8th Voltigeur Regiments. Each regiment had two battalions.

Napoleon struck at Saint-Dizier, believing Field Marshal Gebhard Leberecht von Blücher's Allied army to be there. On 27 January, the French emperor found that he had missed the Prussian field marshal and directed his army southwest toward Brienne-le-Château in three columns. The Battle of Brienne was fought on 29 January. After some cavalry skirmishes, Napoleon ordered Guillaume Philibert Duhesme's division to attack Zakhar Dmitrievich Olsufiev's Russians in Brienne. Duhesme's first assault was repulsed. Napoleon ordered another attack with Decouz's division on Duhesme's right. At this point, Duhesme's division was forced back by a Russian cavalry charge and a French brigade under Louis Huguet-Chateau seized the château, nearly capturing Blücher. The Prussian field marshal ordered Fabian Wilhelm von Osten-Sacken's Russian corps to clear the French from Brienne and Olsufiev to retake the château. In the event, Olsufiev failed but Sacken succeeded after desperate fighting. Decouz was mortally wounded and his successor Admiral Pierre Baste was killed. Decouz was shot twice in the chest. The first wound occurred early in the battle but Decouz refused to leave the field. The second wound proved fatal. Pelet became the division's acting commander until 11 February.

Decouz died on 18 February 1814 in Paris. His name is on the east pillar of the Arc de Triomphe. Decouz is buried in the 22nd division of Père Lachaise Cemetery in Paris.
