= Jean-Jacques Germain Pelet-Clozeau =

French general, politician and historian

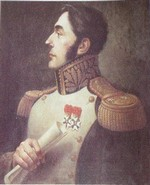
- Jean-Jacques Germain Pelet-Clozeau
- Born: 15 July 1777; Toulouse, France
- Died: 20 December 1858 (aged 81); Paris, France
- Military career
- Allegiance: France
- Branch: Engineers, Staff, Infantry
- Service years: 1800–1818
- Rank: Lieutenant General
- Conflicts: War of the Third Coalition; Battle of Caldiero; War of the Fourth Coalition; Invasion of Naples; War of the Fifth Coalition; Battle of Ebelsberg; Battle of Aspern-Essling; Battle of Wagram; Battle of Znaim; Peninsular War; Siege of Almeida; Battle of Bussaco; French invasion of Russia; Battle of Smolensk; Battle of Borodino; Battle of Krasnoi; War of the Sixth Coalition; Battle of Brienne; Battle of La Rothière; Six Days' Campaign; Battle of Montereau; Battle of Craonne; Battle of Laon; Battle of Reims; Battle of Arcis-sur-Aube; Hundred Days; Battle of Ligny; Battle of Waterloo; Belgian Revolution
- Awards: Order of Saint-Louis, 1814
- Other work: Peer of France, 1837; Senate of France, 1851

Jean-Jacques Germain Pelet-Clozeau (French: [ʒɑ̃ ʒak ʒɛʁmɛ̃ pəlɛ klozo]; 15 July 1777 – 20 December 1858) became a French general in the Napoleonic Wars and later was a politician and historian. He joined the French army in 1800 and became a topographic engineer. He joined the staff of Marshal André Masséna and was wounded at Caldiero in 1805. He served in southern Italy in 1806 and Poland in 1807. He was wounded at Ebelsberg and fought at Aspern-Essling and Wagram in 1809.

When Emperor Napoleon ordered Masséna to take command of the Army of Portugal, Pelet went with him as his first aide-de-camp. Though Pelet was a relatively low-ranking officer, the marshal relied heavily on his advice during the unsuccessful 1810–1811 invasion of Portugal. Pelet fought in the French invasion of Russia, including during Marshal Michel Ney's epic retreat at Krasnoi where he was wounded again. Promoted to general officer, he led troops in the 1813 and 1814 campaigns, including a brief stint as acting division commander. He led a regiment of the Old Guard at Waterloo.

Placed on the army's inactive list, Pelet nevertheless worked in the military archives while publishing books and articles about the wars. In 1830, he was appointed director of the army staff school. Though nearly killed in an assassination attempt in 1835, he continued to publish military histories. Under the Second French Empire he engaged in diplomacy and politics. Pelet is one of the names inscribed under the Arc de Triomphe, on Column 19.

== Early career ==
Pelet was born on 15 July 1777 in Toulouse, France and became a student at the College of Science and Arts in his hometown. After graduation he enlisted in the army when he was 22 years old. In 1800, he was first appointed a sergeant in an Haute Garonne battalion and was later assigned to an engineer unit in the Army of Italy. He was promoted to second lieutenant in 1801 and worked as a topographic engineer for the next four years. During this period he went with Marshal Jean-Baptiste Jourdan on a survey of the Tyrol. In 1805, Marshal André Masséna asked him to serve on his staff and he was appointed an aide-de-camp within a month.

== Napoleonic Wars ==
=== 1805–1811 ===
Pelet fought in the Battle of Caldiero on 28–30 October 1805 where he was hit by a musket ball in the head. He recovered and served on Masséna's staff during the 1806 invasion of Naples, after which he was promoted captain. He went with Masséna to Poland in 1807 but was not involved in any fighting. He was wounded in the brutal fighting at the Battle of Ebelsberg on 3 May 1809. Because his troops had accomplished little during the campaign, Masséna determined to seize the bridge at Ebelsberg. In the ensuing bloodbath, the French lost 1,000 killed, 1,750 wounded and 800 captured. Austrian casualties numbered 1,000 killed, 1,000 wounded and 4,200 captured. About 1,000 wounded soldiers from both sides were incinerated when the town burned. Pelet earned an elevation in rank to major 12 days after Ebelsberg. He fought in the Battle of Aspern-Essling on 21–22 May 1809. He occupied Windmill Island on 2 July which preceded the Battle of Wagram on 5–6 July and also fought at the Battle of Znaim on 10–11 July.

After several months of quiet, Napoleon appointed Masséna commander of the Army of Portugal in mid-April 1810 and charged him to drive the British army from Portugal. The army included the II Corps, VI Corps and VIII Corps. Massena tried to decline the office, believing that corps commanders Marshal Michel Ney and General Jean-Andoche Junot would be insubordinate. However, the French emperor was insistent. At this time, Pelet became Masséna's first aide-de-camp when the previous one, Charles Escorches de Sainte-Croix was promoted to command a brigade of cavalry.

Pelet took part in the negotiations that ended the Siege of Almeida after a lucky French hit blew up the main powder magazine. He was present at the Battle of Bussaco on 27 September 1810. On 12 October Sainte-Croix was killed by a British cannonball. Historian Charles Oman believed that after Sainte-Croix's death, Pelet was the only officer who could exert personal influence with Masséna. While the Army of Portugal was in retreat on 23 March 1811, Pelet was ordered to return to Paris to report on the campaign and explain why Masséna removed Ney from command of VI Corps.

On arriving in Paris, Pelet insisted on seeing Emperor Napoleon as his orders from Masséna required, despite being discouraged to do so. After waiting patiently for an entire day, he was finally allowed to see Napoleon, who began by venting his anger at Pelet for the failed campaign in Portugal. After calming down a little, the emperor offered up a series of pointed criticisms, which the undaunted Pelet carefully explained, defending both Masséna's and his own actions. By the end of the 3-hour interview, Napoleon's attitude changed to a friendlier one. Pelet was invited to return the next day and help Napoleon compose the bulletin that would be released to the public. Pelet recommended to the emperor that the corps commanders be removed. Evidently, this advice was followed because the corps commanders were soon sent home and the Army of Portugal was reorganized into six independent divisions. Napoleon then promoted Pelet to colonel. Another source gave the date of his promotion as 12 October 1812.

=== 1812–1815 ===
Before the 1812 French invasion of Russia, Jean Gabriel Marchand who served as chief of staff of the right wing, asked Pelet to join his staff. Marchand and Pelet both had participated in the Portugal invasion. Pelet fought at the Battles of Smolensk and Borodino. After Borodino, he was assigned to lead the 48th Line Infantry Regiment in Étienne Pierre Sylvestre Ricard's division in Marshal Louis-Nicolas Davout's III Corps; after Smolensk Ricard was under Ney's command. At the Battle of Krasnoi, Ricard's division and Ney's rear guard found themselves cut off by large Russian forces. The French tried to break through, but in the effort the 48th Line lost 550 out of 650 soldiers while Pelet was shot in the arm, right foot and left leg. In a meeting with Ney, Pelet advised the marshal to cross the frozen Dnieper River. This recommendation was followed and Ney escaped the trap with 900 survivors.

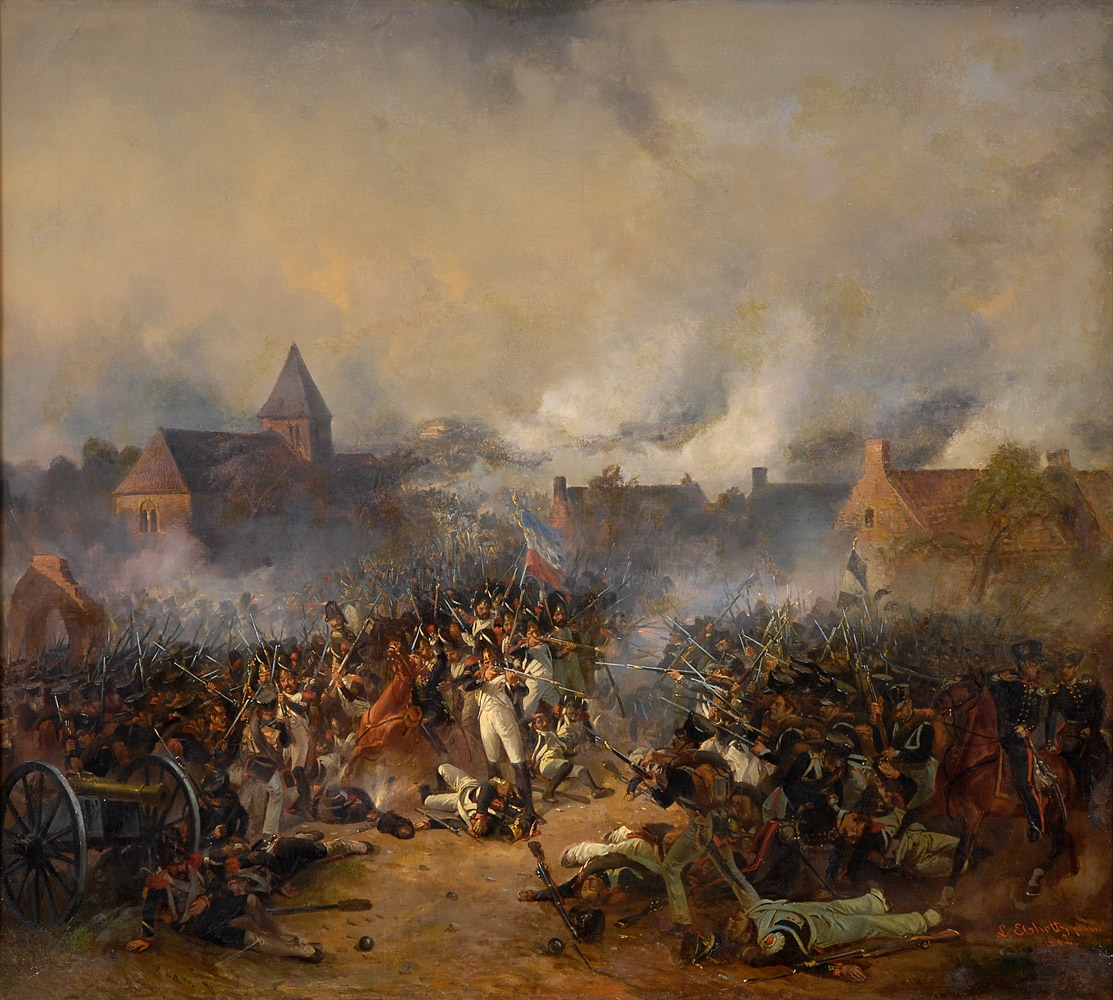
Fighting in Plancenoit during the Battle of Waterloo

Pelet was promoted general of brigade on 12 April 1813. In that year's campaign, Pelet first served with Marshal Auguste de Marmont's VI Corps and later with François Rouget's 4th Young Guard Division. At the Battle of Dresden on 26–27 August 1813, Pelet led the 2nd Brigade in Pierre Decouz's 3rd Young Guard Division in the I Young Guard Corps under Marshal Nicolas Oudinot. The brigade consisted of two battalions each of the 9th and 10th Voltiguer Regiments. Pelet's brigade included two battalions each of the 9th, 10th and 12th Voltiguer Regiments at the Battle of Leipzig on 16–19 October. In that action, Decouz's 2-brigade division numbered 4,731 soldiers.

On 25 January 1814 when the French army assembled at Châlons-sur-Marne, Pelet commanded a brigade in Decouz's 2nd Young Guard Division in Ney's corps. There were 680 soldiers in the 5th Voltiguer Regiment and 633 men in the 6th Voltiguers. After Decouz was killed at the Battle of Brienne on 29 January, Pelet became acting commander of the division. He led the division in the Battle of La Rothière on 1 February, the Battle of Champaubert on 10 February and the Battle of Montmirail on 11 February. He was reassigned to lead a brigade in Louis Friant's Old Guard Division on 14 February. At La Rothière the division counted 1,800 men, while at Champaubert there were 2,840 soldiers present for duty. Philibert Jean-Baptiste Curial was the official commander of the 2nd Young Guard Division during this time. Pelet fought at the battles of Vauchamps and Montereau in February and at Craonne, Laon, Reims and Arcis-sur-Aube in March.

After Napoleon's abdication, Pelet received the Order of Saint-Louis from the Bourbon Restoration and was assigned to the Royal Chasseurs. Nevertheless, he rallied to Napoleon during the Hundred Days and became commander of the 2nd Guard Foot Chasseurs, an 1,100-strong unit in Charles Antoine Morand's division. Pelet's guardsmen fought at the Battle of Ligny on 16 June 1815. At the Battle of Waterloo two days later, Pelet's regiment initially was part of the reserve, but he was later ordered to take his 1st Battalion and defend Plancenoit from the Prussians.

The Prussians succeeded in driving the Young Guard and the corps of Georges Mouton, Count de Lobau from the village. In this crisis, Pelet with the 1st Battalion of the 2nd Guard Chasseur Regiment and Morand with the 1st Battalion of the 2nd Guard Grenadier Regiment attacked to recapture the village. As these elite troops advanced with leveled bayonets, the Prussian defenders panicked. Historian David Hamilton-Williams explained that the Prussians were accustomed to seeing the Imperial Guard committed in mass and assumed that many thousands of French guardsmen must be following in the wake of the first two battalions. The Old Guard battalions, joined by the survivors of Lobau's command and the Young Guard, swept their enemies out of Plancenoit with 3,000 casualties. Later that evening, the Prussian reconquered the village house by house against desperate resistance. Pelet and 250 guard chasseurs fought their way out of the village with their eagle, fended off Prussian horsemen and escaped.

== Later career ==
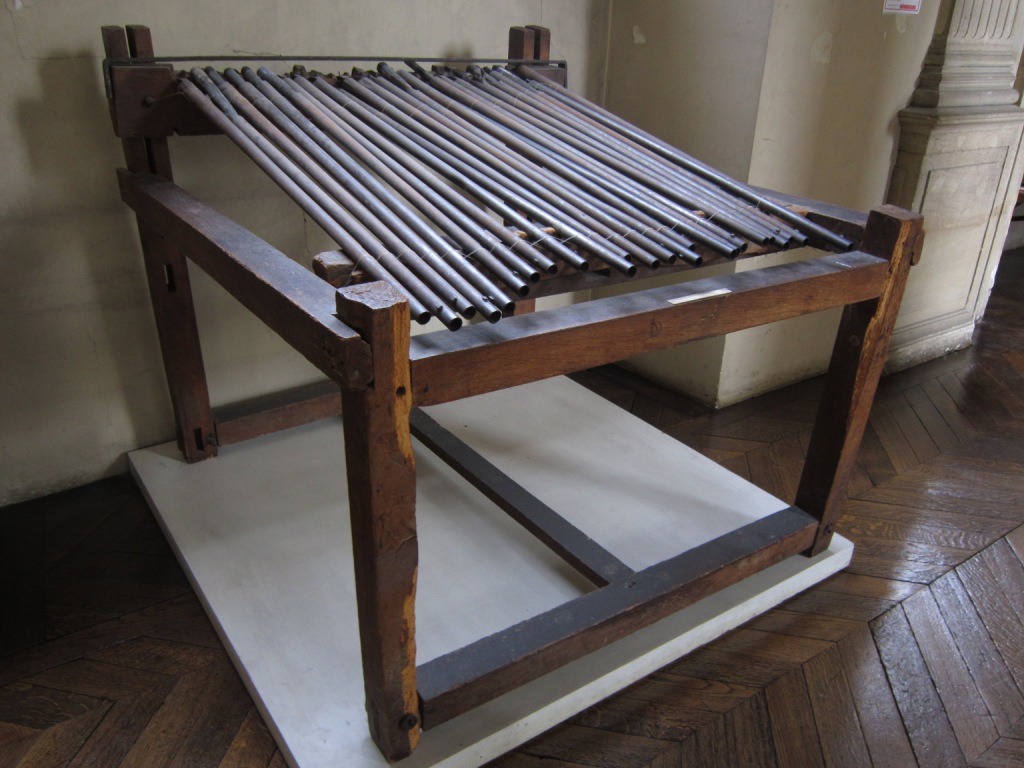
Fieschi's infernal machine

Pelet was placed on half pay in inactive status for three years, then he was appointed to the Royal General Staff through the efforts of Marshal Laurent Gouvion Saint-Cyr. From 1821 to 1830 he was again put in inactive status. During this time he worked in the archives at the Dépôt de la guerre (War Depot). In 1826 he published Mémoires sur la guerre de 1809, en Allemagne. Over the next two years he published 12 articles about the 1813 campaigns. He wrote an article about the campaign in Portugal in 1827.

After the Bourbons were overthrown in the July Revolution of 1830, Pelet was promoted to lieutenant general and elected to the French Assembly. He was appointed director of the Dépôt de la guerre and the General Staff School. He took part in the French intervention in the Belgian Revolution in 1832 and later that year assumed command of the 2nd Infantry Division. He preferred to immerse himself in his studies however. In 1835 he began to publish a series of maps for the General Staff. At the same time, he began an 11-volume history of the War of the Spanish Succession which would take 15 years to complete. In July 1835 he was badly wounded by Giuseppe Marco Fieschi's infernal machine in an assassination attempt against King Louis Philippe I.

Pelet became a Peer of France in 1837. He became president of the General Staff's consulting committee in 1841. He was secretly sent to advise King Charles Albert of Sardinia in 1849. He was elected to the Legislative Assembly in 1850. After Emperor Napoleon III seized power in December 1851, Pelet became a member of the Senate and the Academy of Science. He advised Napoleon III on military matters during the Crimean War. Up to the moment of his death on 20 December 1858, his mental and physical abilities remained intact.

In their published works, both Pelet and Marshal Jacques MacDonald criticized Napoleon's choice of Eugène de Beauharnais as commander of the Army of Italy in 1809. Their low opinion of Eugène influenced later writers such as Francis Loraine Petre and J. F. C. Fuller. Historian Frederick C. Schneid believed that Pelet and MacDonald were "extremely biased" against Eugène for political and personal reasons.
